= Royal Terrace, Edinburgh =

Street in Edinburgh, Scotland

Coordinates: 55.9569°N 3.1776°W

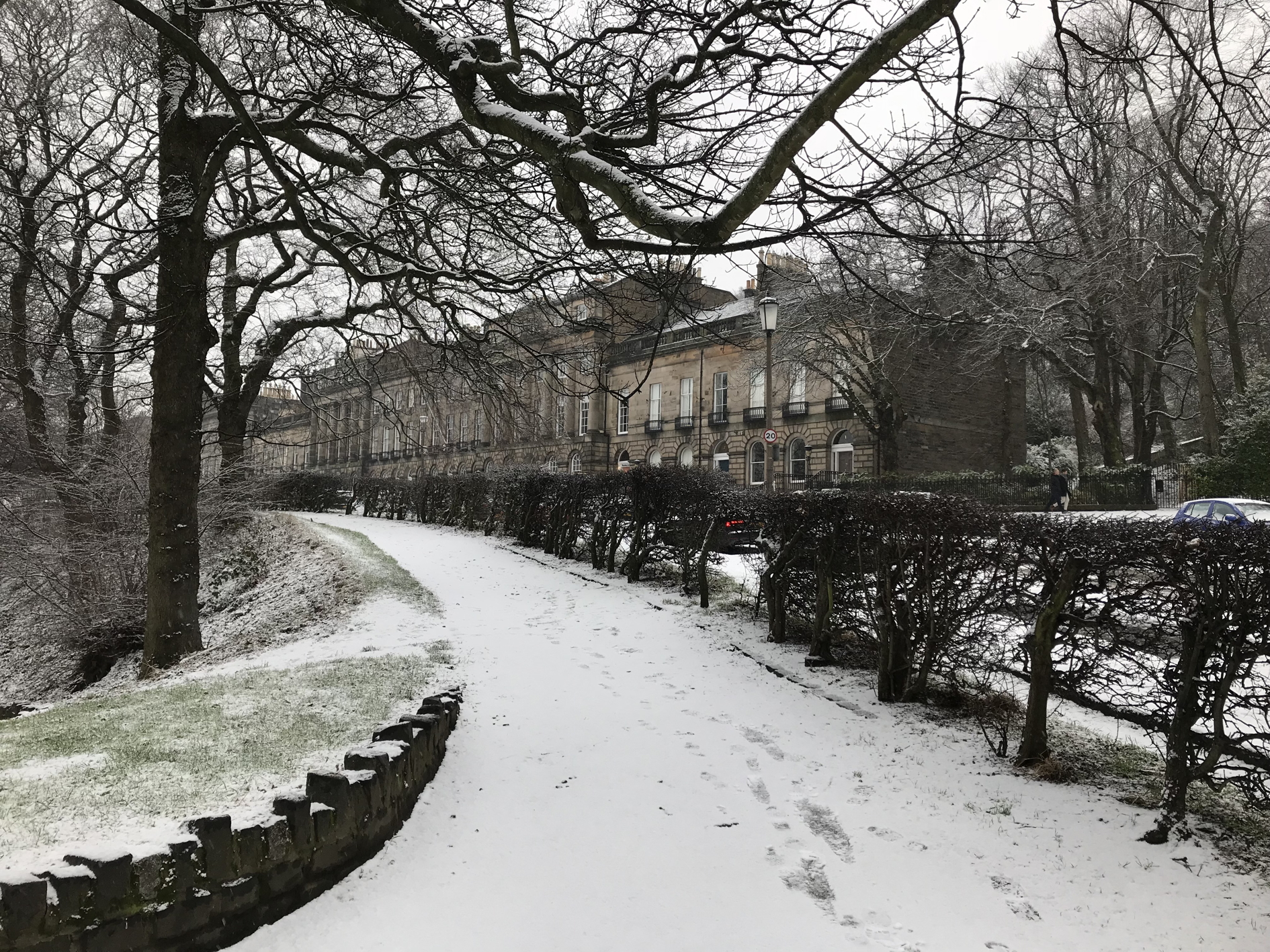
View of the western end of Royal Terrace, from London Road Gardens, formerly Royal Terrace Gardens

Royal Terrace is a grand street in the city of Edinburgh, Scotland, on the north side of Calton Hill within the New Town and part of the UNESCO World Heritage Site inscribed in 1995, built on the south side of a setted street, facing the sloping banks of London Road Gardens, formerly Royal Terrace Gardens, with views looking north towards Leith and the Firth of Forth.

== Showpiece of the Eastern New Town ==
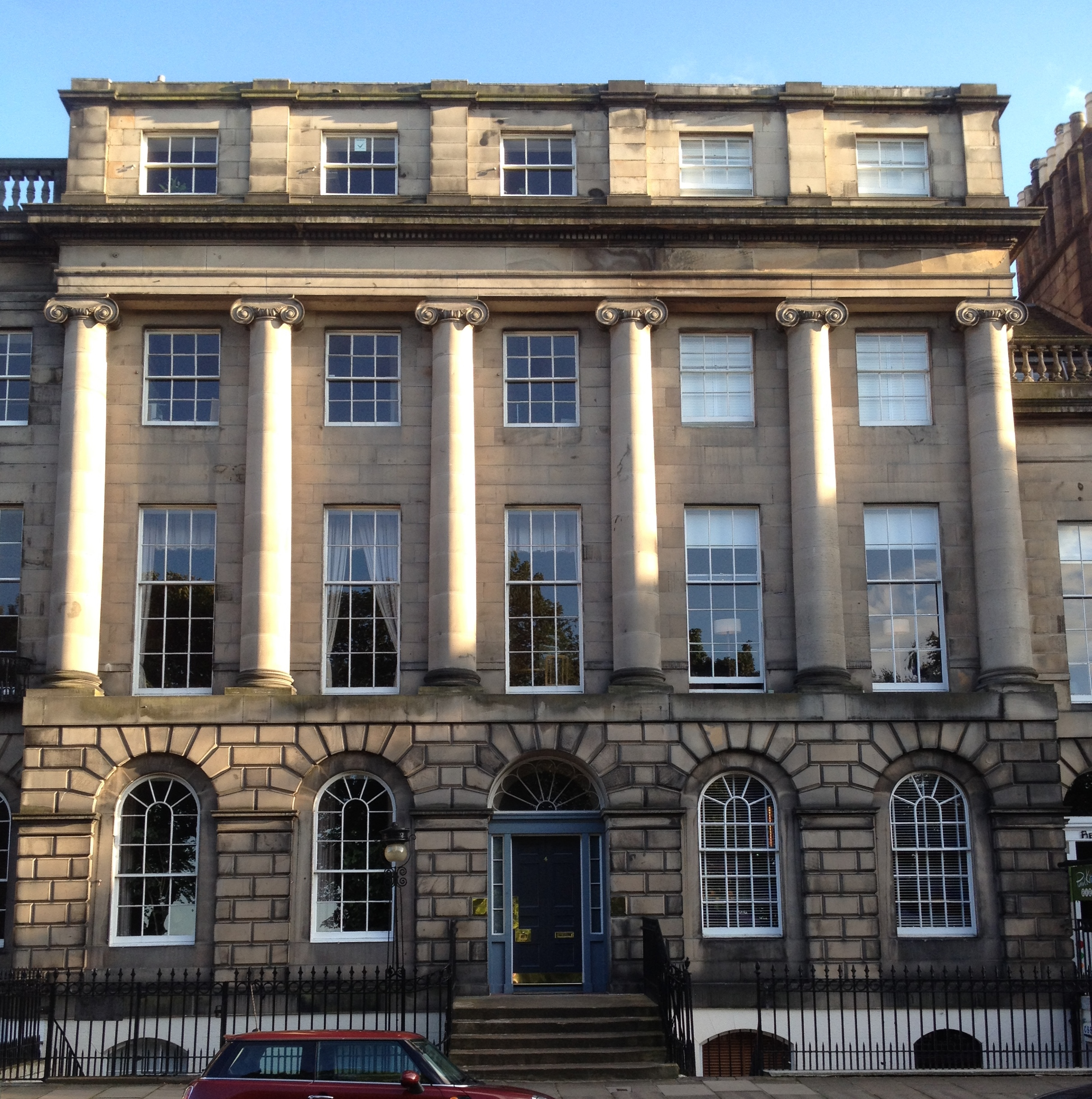
A section of Royal Terrace at the west end of the street, with six Ionic columns. This contains two townhouses: number 4 with the central entrance and two bays to the left, and number 3 with the right two bays and an entrance in the un-colonnaded section to the right (just out of view).

William Henry Playfair designed Royal Terrace between 1820 and 1824. Together with the adjoining Carlton and Regent Terraces, the three streets are in a continuous line, cut only by Carlton Terrace Lane giving access to mews, leading around the eastern end of Calton Hill and surrounding Regent Gardens, the largest of the private gardens of the New Town. These streets, with Royal Terrace the grandest, were the showpiece of Playfair's conception for the Eastern New Town, intended to be grander than James Craig's original development. The streets were named in connection with the visit to Edinburgh of George IV in 1822. The extension was projected to reach from Calton Hill down towards Leith, although ultimately very little of the northern section was ever built.

== Architecture ==
Royal Terrace is in the form of an extended, 121-bay 'palace front' of classical 3-bay (and one 4-bay) townhouses. Playfair's original drawings are held by Edinburgh University, including plans for the whole facade as well as individual sections. The houses are now all category A listed buildings.

The design of the townhouses is unlike those in neighbouring streets. Door entrances and windows on the ground floor are arched and surrounded by V-chamfered rusticated stone work. Ten of the houses still have their original fanlights. The upper floors throughout are of polished ashlar stone with basements of droved ashlar. The houses are of two or three storeys with attics to the colonnaded sections.

The long symmetrical facade alternates between colonnaded and un-colonnaded sections, from east to west, as follows:

1. plain with roof balustrade
2. pavilion with 6 Ionic columns
3. plain with roof balustrade
4. pavilion with 6 Ionic columns
5. plain with roof balustrade
6. pavilion with 7 Corinthian columns
7. plain with roof balustrade
8. pavilion with 10 Corinthian columns (centre)
9. plain with roof balustrade
10. pavilion with 7 Corinthian columns
11. plain with roof balustrade
12. pavilion with 6 Ionic columns
13. plain with roof balustrade
14. pavilion with 6 Ionic columns
15. plain with roof balustrade

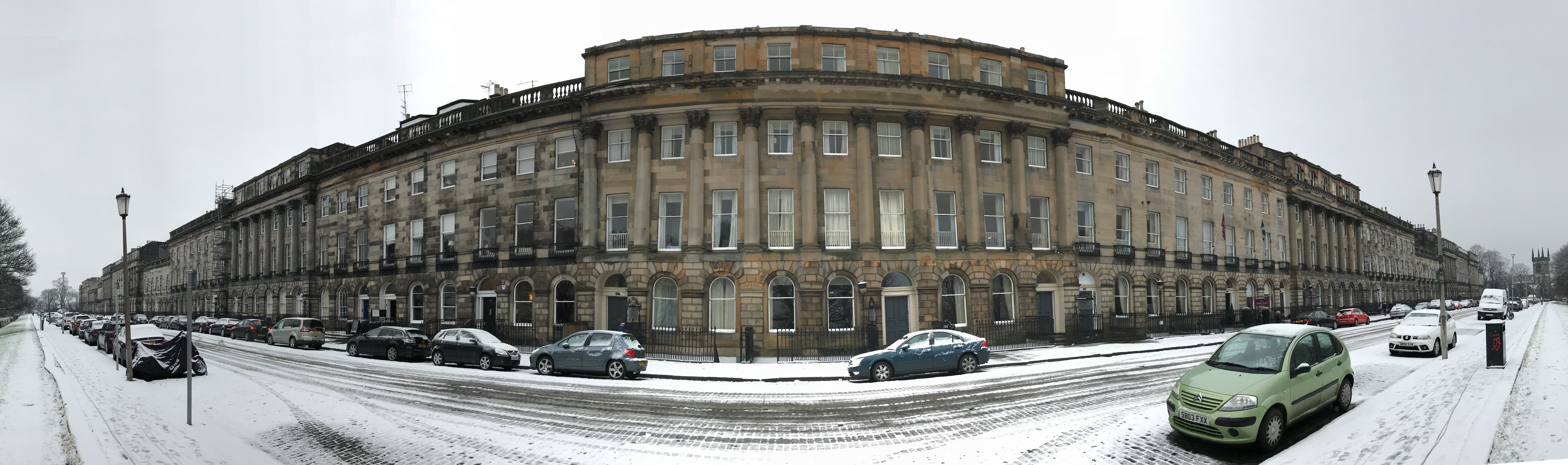
Panorama of Royal Terrace, Edinburgh, reaching from Carlton Terrace in the east (extreme left), to Greenside Church in the west (extreme right) — this is probably the longest Georgian terrace in Europe, a straight, continuous structure measuring 360 metres from east to west.

== Construction ==
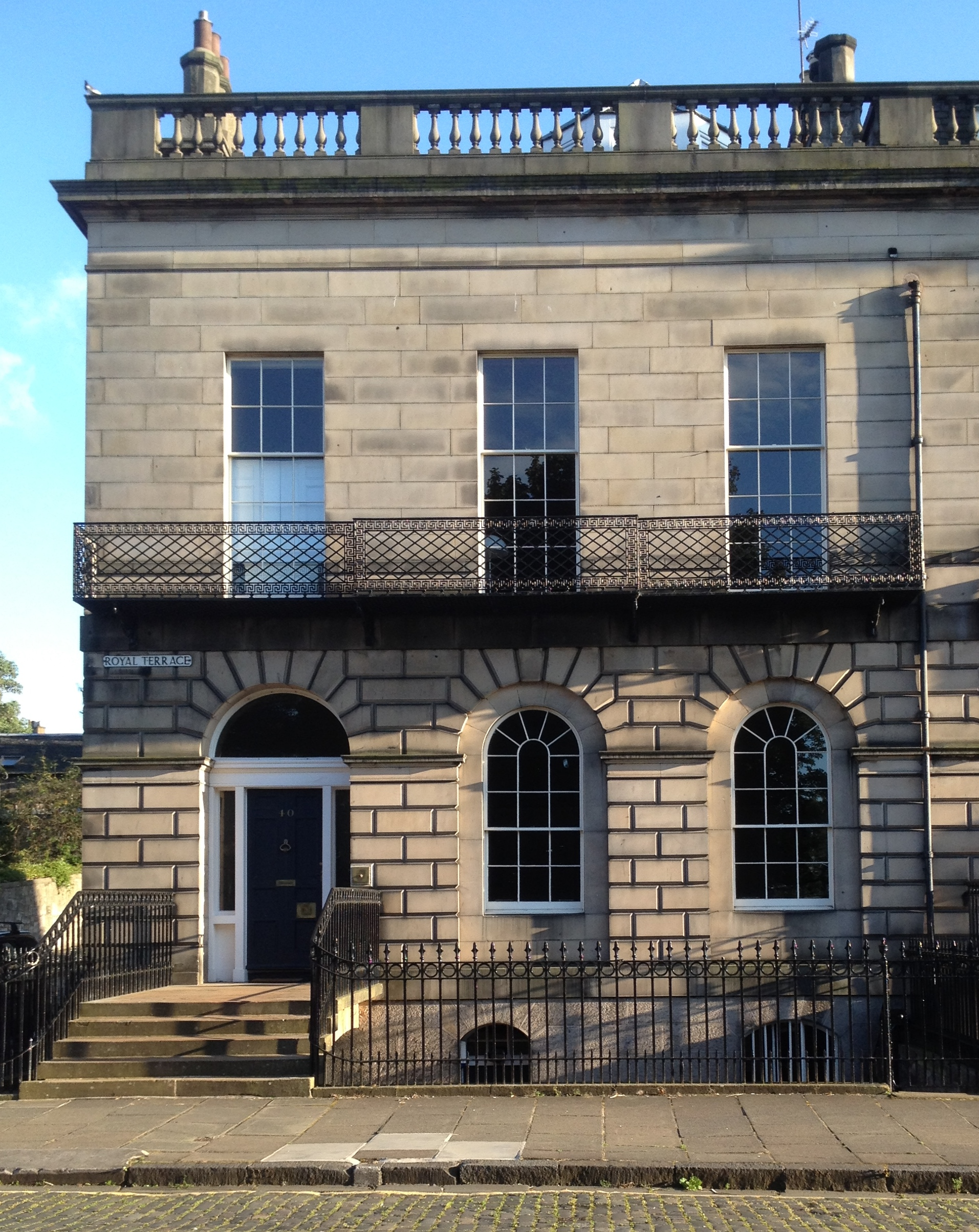
40 Royal Terrace, the first house to be built in 1821–1822, an example of a two-storey townhouse (with basement and attic) in a section without Greek columns

Playfair hoped to attract "fashionable and wealthy people" to Calton Hill, but almost immediately he encountered competition from new developments to the western end of the New Town, in particular the Moray Estate.

In contrast to Regent and Carlton Terraces, which were rapidly completed in the 1830s, the building in Royal Terrace stretched over 40 years. The first house to be completed was number 40 at the east end of the terrace, which was built in 1821–1822, and this was followed by the sections containing numbers 4 to 14, 23 to 29 and 35 to 39, which were all finished between 1823 and the early 1830s.

The gaps in the facade were not filled until the 1850s and 1860s. The section from 31 to 34 dates from around 1854 to 1859. Numbers 1 and 2 were built in 1857, and number 3 in 1859. The section from 16 to 22 was built in the early 1860s, with number 15 also dating from that decade.

== Length and 'Whisky row' ==
Royal Terrace is a continuous straight structure of about 360 metres, reputedly the longest Georgian terrace in Europe. It is 30 metres longer than the Royal York Crescent (1791–1820) in Clifton, Bristol. The Moray Estate claim a single built-up environment of nearly 600 metres, but unlike Royal Terrace, this is a series of unbroken streets rather than a single entity.

Royal Terrace was known in Edinburgh as 'Whisky Row', supposedly because merchants living there had an unobstructed view of their ships coming into Leith Harbour. In fact, some wine merchants did come to live in the terrace, including John Crabbie (1806–1891), founder of John Crabbie & Company, responsible for Crabbie's Ginger Wine, who lived in number 22 from 1861 to 1891.

== Former residents ==
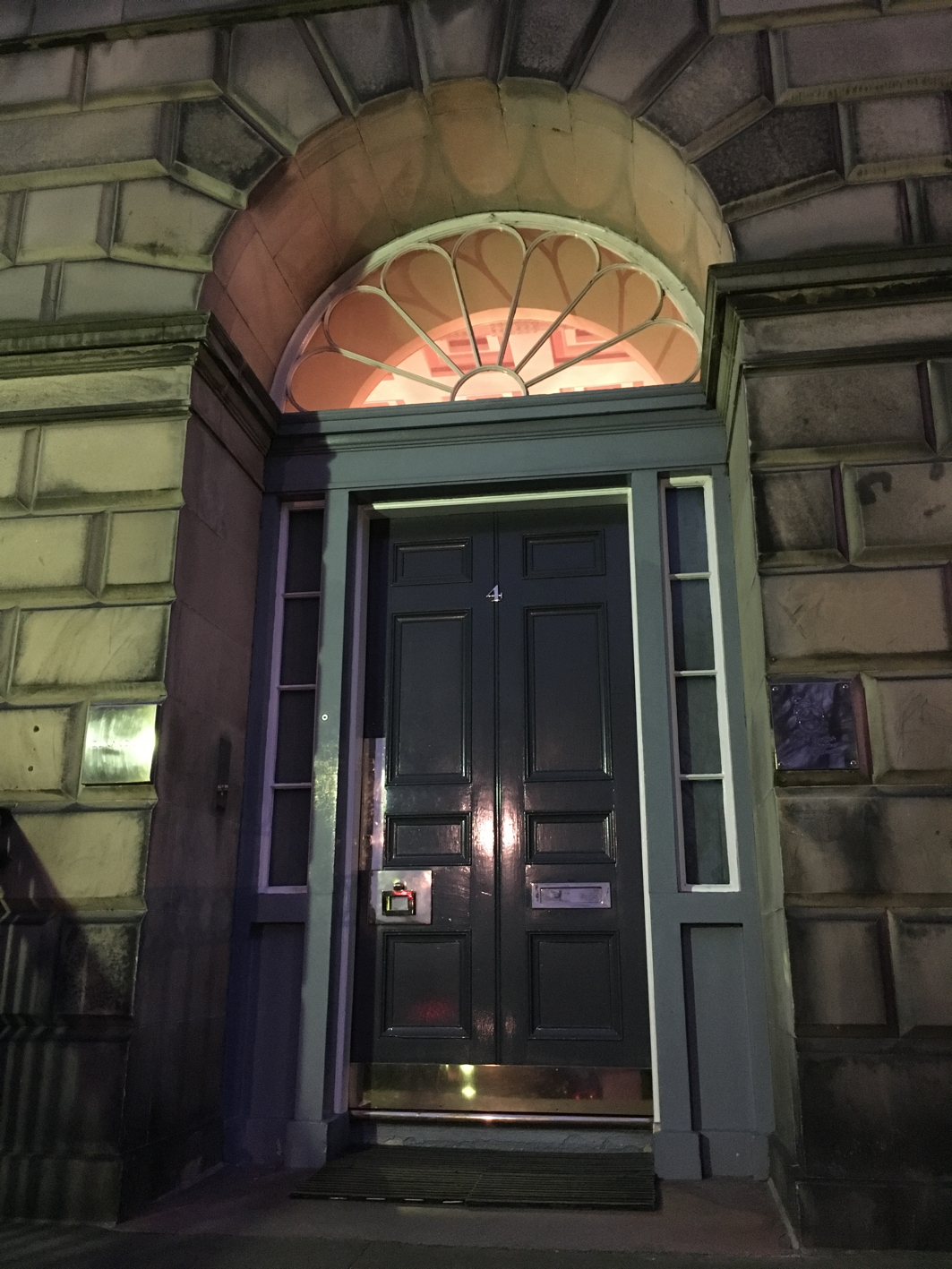
Entrance to 4 Royal Terrace with original fanlight above the door

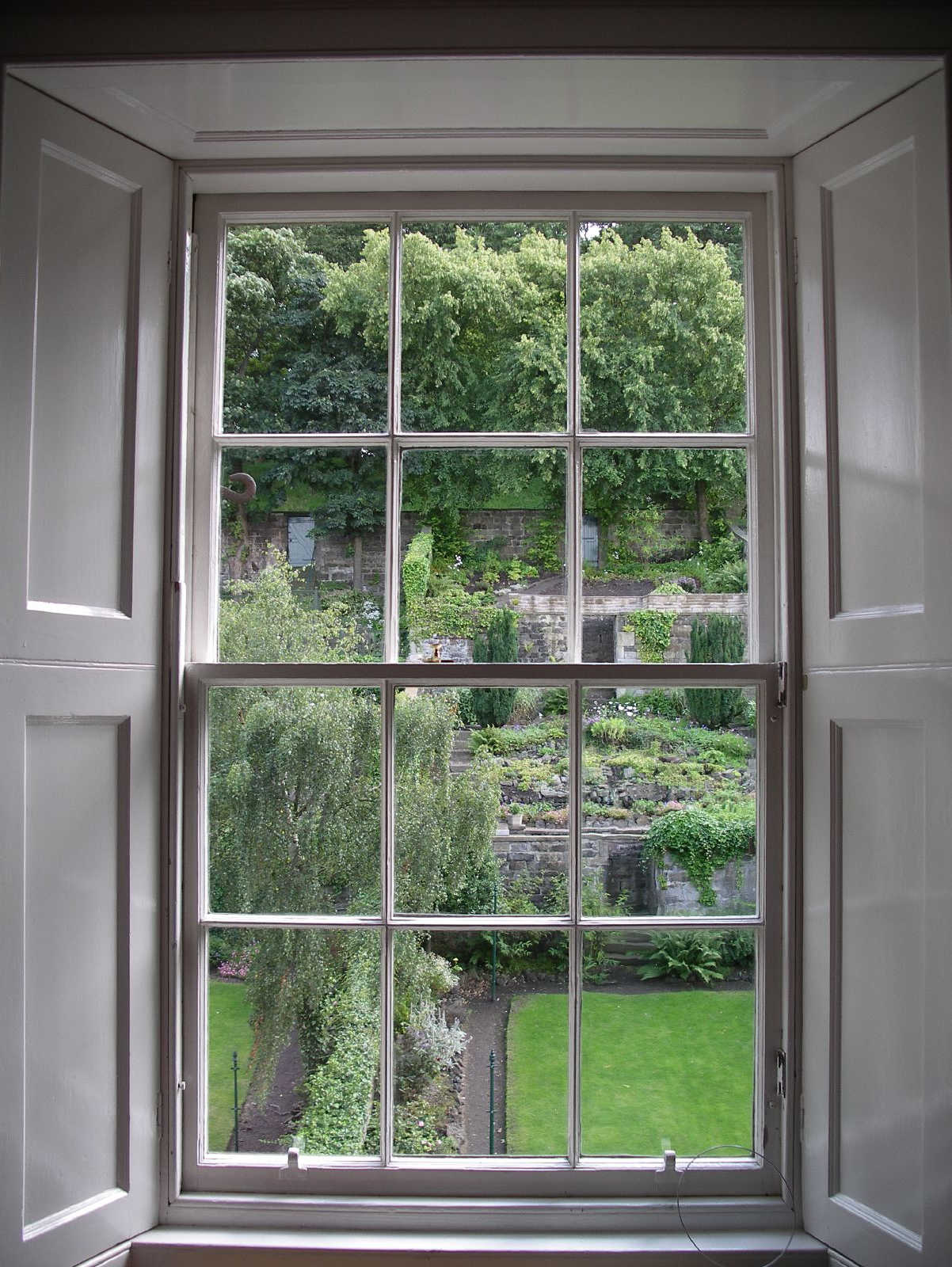
Garden behind 11 Royal Terrace

=== Listed by address ===
- 1 - John Colquhoun (1805–1885) sportsman and sportswriter and Sir Alan John Colquhoun
- 1 - Lucy Bethia Walford (1845–1915) novelist and artist, daughter of John Colquhoun
- 1 - Frances Mary Colquhoun (1836–) author, daughter of John Colquhoun
- 3 (or 5?) - William Paterson Paterson (1860–1939) theologian and Moderator of the General Assembly of the Church of Scotland
- 5 - Henry Westmacott, monumental sculptor, son of Richard Westmacott, sculptor
- 5 - Robert Kerr Hannay (1867–1940) historian
- 5 - Robert Flint (1838–1910) theologian and philosopher
- 8 - Alexander Ignatius Roche (1861–1921) artist, an important figure in the “Glasgow Boys”
- 15 - Charles Piazzi Smyth (1819–1900), Astronomer Royal for Scotland (1846–1888)
- 19 - Rev Robert Boog Watson (1823–1910) malacologist and minister of the Free Church of Scotland, and his brother Patrick Heron Watson
- 19 - Francis Chalmers Crawford (1851–1908) FRSE, stockbroker, amateur botanist and ornithologist
- 20 - Charles Alexander Stevenson (1855–1950) lighthouse engineer, uncle of Robert Louis Stevenson
- 21-22 - Charles Saroléa (1870–1953) Professor of French and writer on international affairs
- 22 - George Reid (1841–1913) artist
- 24, 38, 35 - James Cowan (1816–1895) Liberal Party politician, son of Alexander Cowan
- 25 - Alan Stevenson (1807–1865) lighthouse engineer, uncle of Robert Louis Stevenson
- 25 - David Stevenson (1815–1886) lighthouse designer, uncle of Robert Louis Stevenson
- 27 - Sir William Taylour Thomson (1813–1883) KCMG CB, military officer and diplomat
- 28 - John Crabbie (1806-1891) - founder of John Crabbie & Co, Crabbies Green Ginger etc.
- 28 - Roderick Ross (1865–1943) Chief Constable of Edinburgh City Police (1900–1935)
- 28 - Thomas Hutchison (1866–1925) landowner and politician, Lord Provost of Edinburgh from 1921 to 1923
- 32 - John Bartholomew (1831–1893) cartographer
- 32 - Thomas Brown (1806–1872) architect
- 33 - Lt Gen Thomas Robert Swinburne (1794–1864) and Adam Alexander Dawson (1913–2010) film and television author
- 35 - Alexander Cowan (1775–1859) papermaker and philanthropist, father of James Cowan and Charles Cowan - visited by niece Helen Bannerman, who was also born there
- 36 - Adam Dawson (1842-1915) whisky merchant, Margaret Anne Inches Thomson (1851 - 1919) heiress died here, her spouse John Sen Inches Thomson (1844 - 1933) ship owner and author
- 37 - Rev Prof William Stevenson (1805–1873)
- 37 - Charles Cowan (1801–1889) politician and paper-maker, son of Alexander Cowan
- 39 - Donald Tovey (1875–1940) musicologist, composer, and musician

== Present use ==
The terrace is now in both commercial and residential use. This includes seven hotels, including the voco that occupies the central colonnaded section (numbers 17 to 22), 24 Royal Terrace – a boutique art hotel, , Eleven Royal Terrace - a luxury boutique hotel , a restaurant, the Finnish Consulate, the Ukrainian Community Centre, offices, including those of the Scottish Chamber Orchestra and the arts-supporting Dunard Fund, and rental accommodation. Most of the former townhouses have been split into flats.

It was announced in 2022, that the hotel in 8 Royal Terrace would be converted back to residential use.

In 2026, Number 11 was renovated in to a Luxury Boutique Townhouse hotel, with 13 suites named after local landmarks, and the signature Playfair Suite named after the building's original architect. The property is operated by Effective Hospitality Management on behalf of the owners.

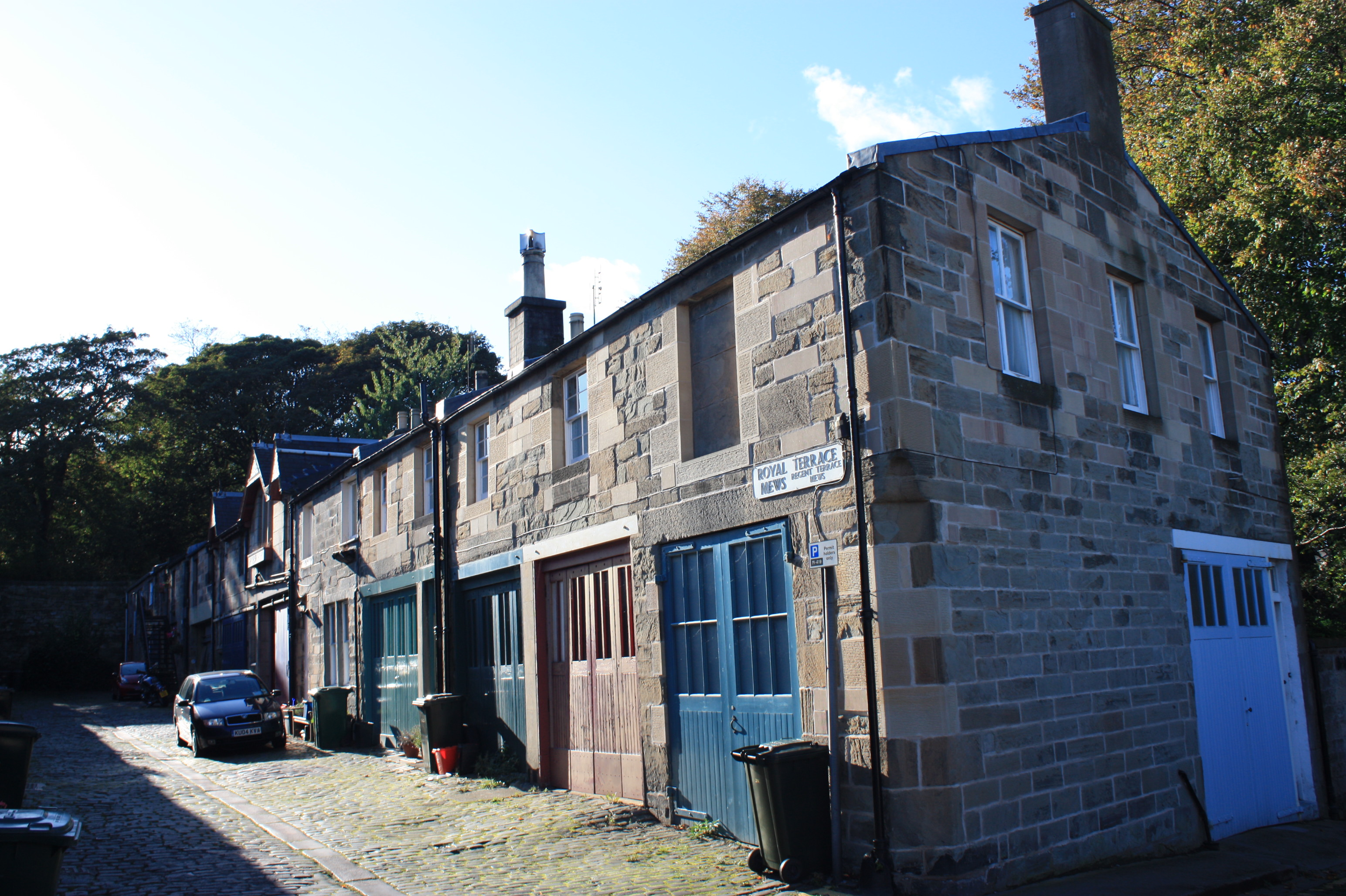
Royal Terrace Mews, originally the stables for the street

== See also ==
- Carlton Terrace, Edinburgh
- Regent, Royal and Carlton Terrace Gardens
- London Road Gardens
- Calton Hill
- Regent Terrace
- William Henry Playfair

== Bibliography ==
- Mitchell, Anne (1993), "The People of Calton Hill", pp 73–98 (chapter 4) Mercat Press, James Thin, Edinburgh, ISBN 1-873644-18-3
