= Carlton Terrace, Edinburgh =

Residential street in Edinburgh, Scotland

Coordinates: 55.9565°N 3.1734°W

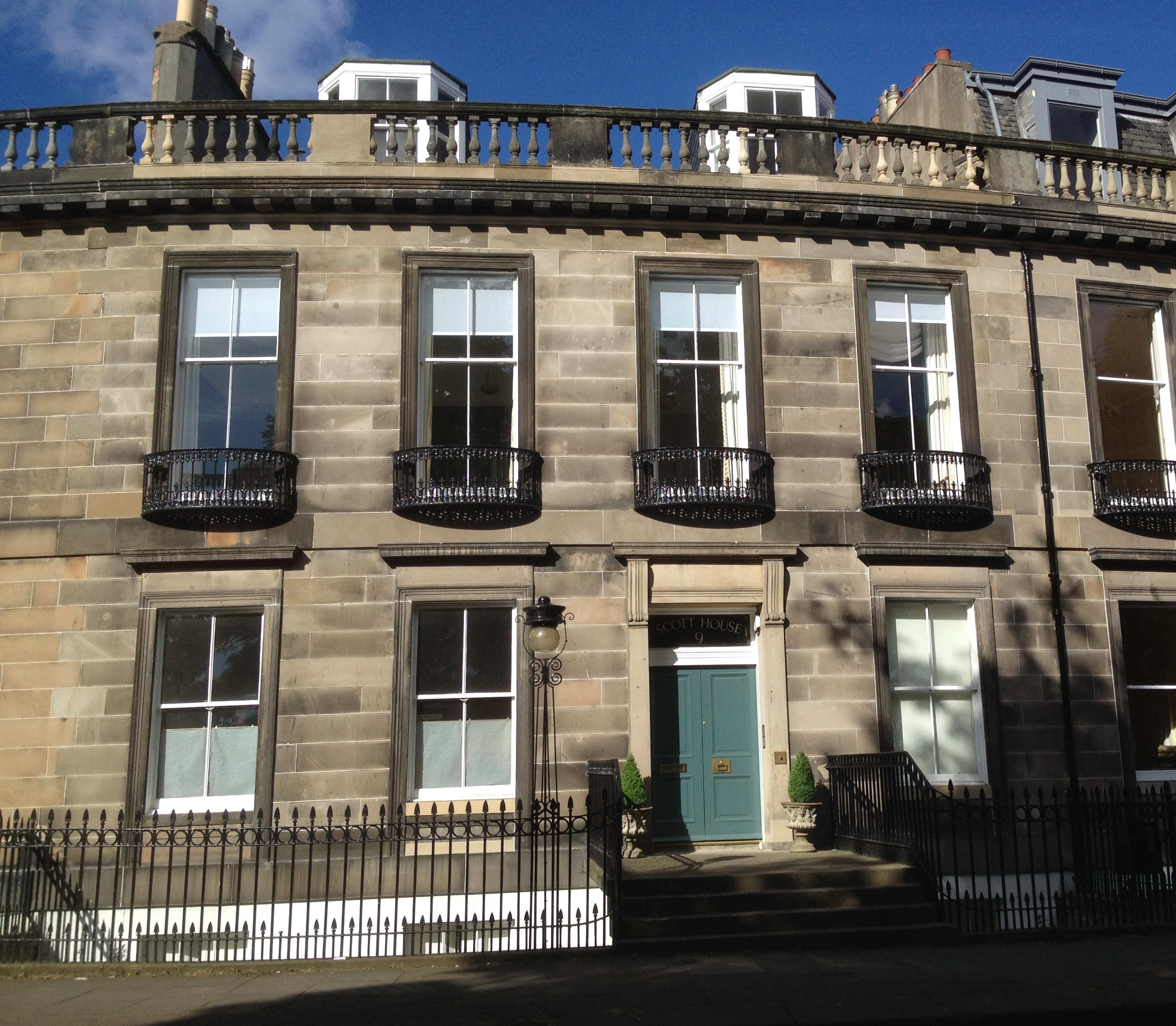
9 Carlton Terrace, a four-bayed townhouse in the centre of the bend, with balustraded parapet and balconettes on the first floor

Carlton Terrace (known as Carlton Place from around 1830 until 1842) is a residential street in Edinburgh, Scotland. It is located on the east side of Calton Hill, at the eastern extremity of the New Town, part of the UNESCO World Heritage Site inscribed in 1995.

The street is in the form of an inverted crescent, a long, hairpin curved terrace of 19 classical town houses, linking together with Regent Terrace and Royal Terrace in a 'necklace' around the hill. Built on the west side of a setted street, the terrace faces sloping gardens descending down to Abbeyhill, across to Holyrood, and over to the heights of Arthur's Seat.

Residents enjoy access to Regent Gardens.

== Architecture ==
=== Design ===
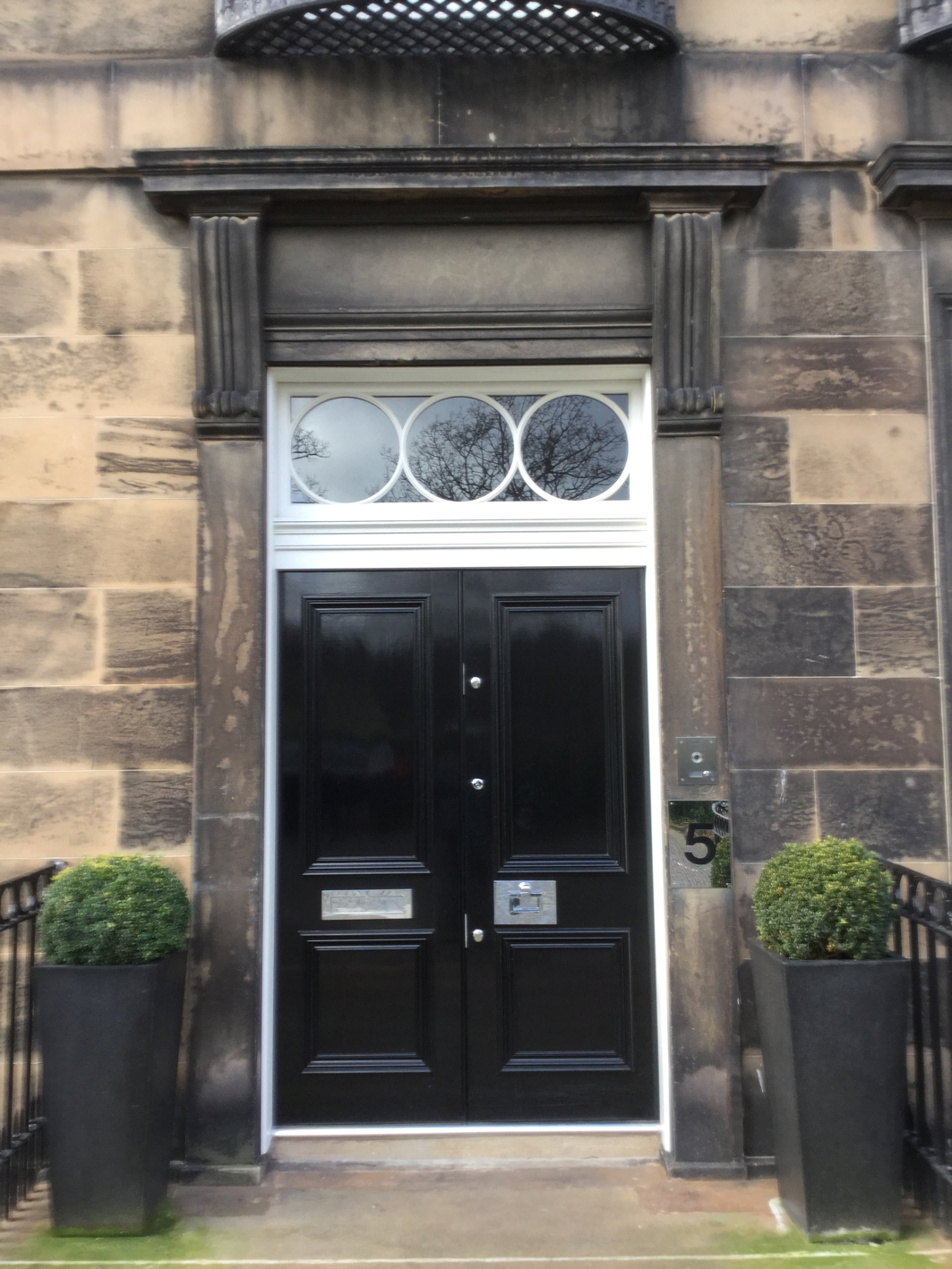
5 Carlton Terrace, with original fanlight designed by Playfair

The Greek Revival architect William Henry Playfair designed Carlton Terrace in the 1820s, and a number of his original drawings, dating from 1821 to 1831, have survived in the Edinburgh University Library. An early drawing dated 1821 (number 1036) shows a design with rustication at ground floor level which was later discarded, and his final design emerged in a series of drawings done in 1825.

Strongly influenced by ideas of the Picturesque, Playfair considered the individual characteristics of the site in making his design. Unlike Regent and Royal Terraces, there were no external columns or pilasters. However, like Regent Terrace, the buildings were two-storeyed with rectangular windows, with no rustication, and had identical fanlights to those in the other terrace (which can still be seen in six of the houses, the first five and number 8).

The first four and the last six houses had straight 3-bay front elevations, but in the middle Playfair created nine wedge-shaped houses with curved 4-bay elevations. With three exceptions, the houses had balustraded parapets, a feature along Royal Terrace, but not used in Regent Terrace.

The houses are now all category A listed buildings.

=== Construction ===
Based on a diagram of the development drawn by Playfair in 1831, we know that the terrace was feued by six builders, or sub-architects, who were on strict instructions to follow Playfair's precise design instructions. One of these, John Neill, responsible for numbers 5, 6, 16, 17 (and the respective mews), occupied the first completed house in 1830, which was number 17. Within the next six years, all the remaining houses were completed and occupied.

== Former residents ==
Listed by address:

- 1: Duncan Cowan (d. 1848), paper-maker and brother of Alexander Cowan; Iain Moncreiffe (1919–1985), British Officer of Arms and genealogist, and his wife Diana Hay, 23rd Countess of Erroll (1926–1978)
- 3: Rev. Walter Tait (d. 1841), minister of Trinity College Kirk and then pastor of the Catholic Apostolic Church in Broughton Street; the Very Rev Dr William Henry Gray DD (1825-1908), Church of Scotland minister and Moderator of the General Assembly
- 5, later 12: Charles Cathcart, 2nd Earl Cathcart (1783–1859), better known as Lord Greenock c.1814-43, British Army general and veteran of the Battle of Waterloo, Governor General of the Province of Canada and Lieutenant Governor of Canada West
- 5: William Birnie Rhind (1853–1933), his brother J. Massey Rhind (1860–1936), both sculptors; Sir Arthur Rose (1875–1937), Commissioner for Special Areas under the Special Areas Act 1934
- 6: Very Rev James Grant (1800-1890), Moderator of the General Assembly of the Church of Scotland; Archibald Kennedy, 4th Marquess of Ailsa (1872–1943)
- 7: Major John Barclay, and his sister Mary Barclay, who endowed the Barclay Viewforth Church; Sir Mitchell Mitchell-Thomson, 1st Baronet (1846-1918), Lord Provost of Edinburgh 1897–1900, and his son William Mitchell-Thomson, 1st Baron Selsdon (1877-1938)
- 9: Major, later Lt Col, Peter Barclay, 14th Madras Native Infantry; Robert Cowan, Writer to the Signet; Major-General Sir Reginald Salmond Curtis
- 10: John Small (1828–1886), Librarian of Edinburgh University
- 11: Leonhard Schmitz (1807-1890) classical scholar and rector of the Royal High School; Sir James Peck (1875–1964), civil servant and his wife Winifred Knox (1882–1962), writer and novelist
- 14: Dr William Mackenzie, of the Madras Medical Service; John Warrack, founder of the steamship company John Warrack & Co of Leith
- 17: John Neill, builder and architect; Alexander Humphrys-Alexander (1783-1859), claimant to the extinct Earldom of Stirling; Sir George Reid (1841-1923), artist; Frederick Thomas Pilkington (1832-1898), architect
- 18: William Home Lizars (1788–1859), painter and engraver

== Building use: townhouses to hotels and offices to flat conversions ==
The terrace was designed as a series of individual townhouses, which they remained throughout the 19th century. Some of the households were large, and each included an average of three resident servants.

Following the social changes after the First World War, up to half of the houses were turned into small private hotels, which in some cases lasted down to this century. Furthermore, from the 1930s, there were offices, including the Commissioner for Special Areas, followed by the Royal Observer Corps and the Scottish Home Office in numbers 13 and 14. Towards the end of the 20th century, the South Edinburgh School of Nursing was at 15, 16, and 17 (still indicated by a marble step with Carlton House in black letters) and the Ingleby Gallery of modern art was at number 6.

In 1934, the owner of number 13 asked the George Heriot Trust to change the title deeds in order to allow him to divide the property, the first attempt anywhere in the three terraces (Regent, Royal and Carlton) to create apartments. The case went to court and the application was refused.

Subsequently, the demand for smaller units became irresistible and many of the houses were indeed converted into residential flats. Today the street is entirely residential with no offices or hotels. Only four or five townhouses remain, the other houses being typically divided floor by floor, or in some cases an upper house on top of a separate basement and garden flat.

== Carlton Terrace Mews ==
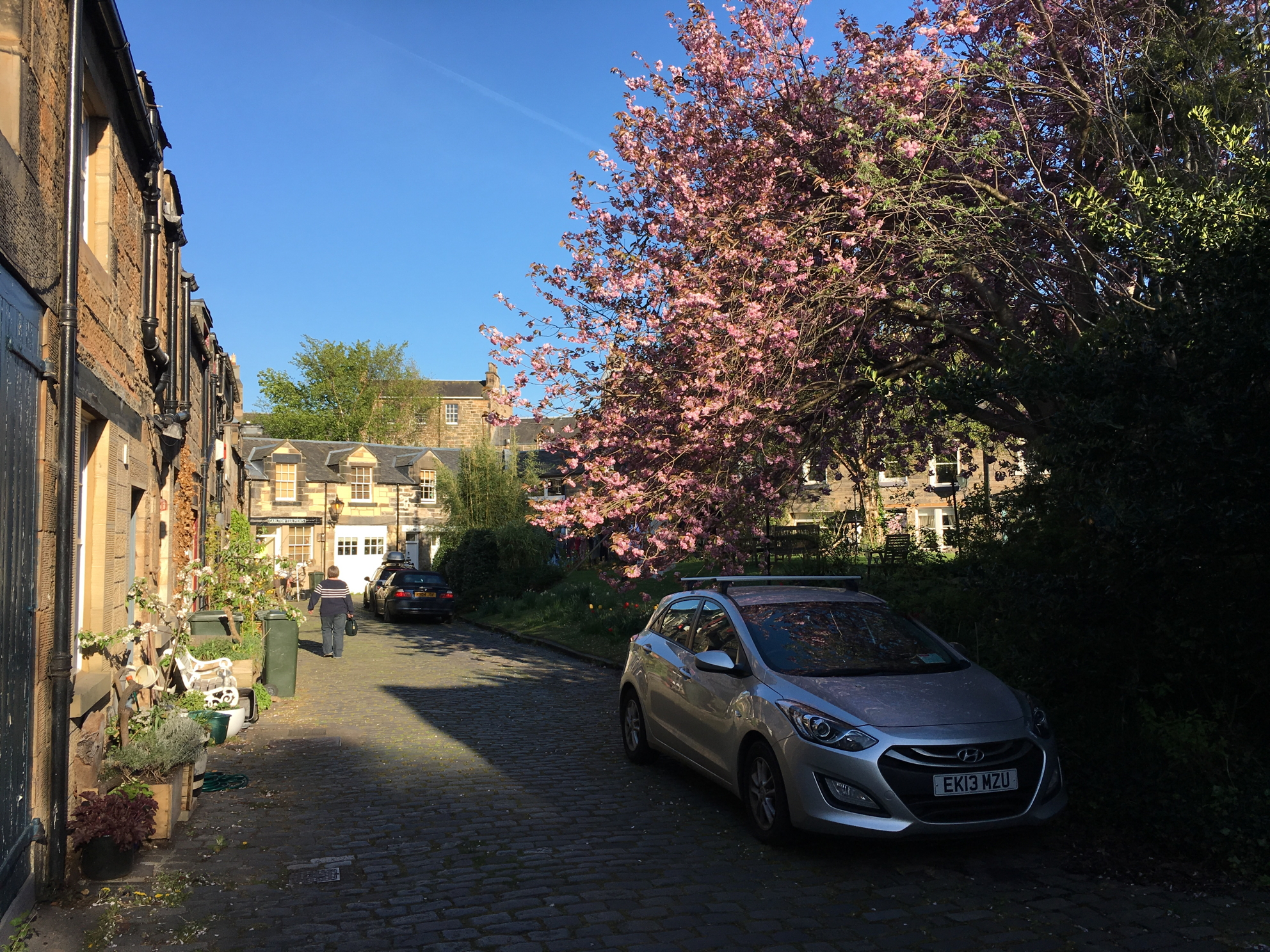
Carlton Terrace Mews in April 2017

Each Carlton Terrace townhouse was designed by Playfair to have its own stable mews, 19 units for 19 houses, located in a circle within the bend of the road. This was unlike Regent and Royal Terrace which only had 22 mews for 74 townhouses. The units were feued, house by house with the terrace in the 1830s, but may have been built later.

Playfair stipulated the exact size of the mews before they were built. They were two-storey dwellings with horses and carriages below, and the coachmen's living accommodation above. During the early 20th century, the mews were converted into garages, and more recently some of the ground-floor garages have been turned into living accommodation. The mews have windows looking into the back street but not outwards towards the terrace. In the centre there is a shared garden, where an Anderson air-raid shelter was located during the Second World War.

== See also ==
- Regent, Royal and Carlton Terrace Garden
- London Road Gardens
- Calton Hill
- Regent Terrace
- Royal Terrace, Edinburgh
- William Henry Playfair

== Bibliography ==
- Mitchell, Anne (1993), "The People of Calton Hill", pp. 99–112 (Chapter 5) Mercat Press, James Thin, Edinburgh, ISBN 1-873644-18-3
