= London Road Gardens, Edinburgh =

Public garden in Edinburgh, Scotland

Coordinates: 55°57′27″N 3°10′40″W

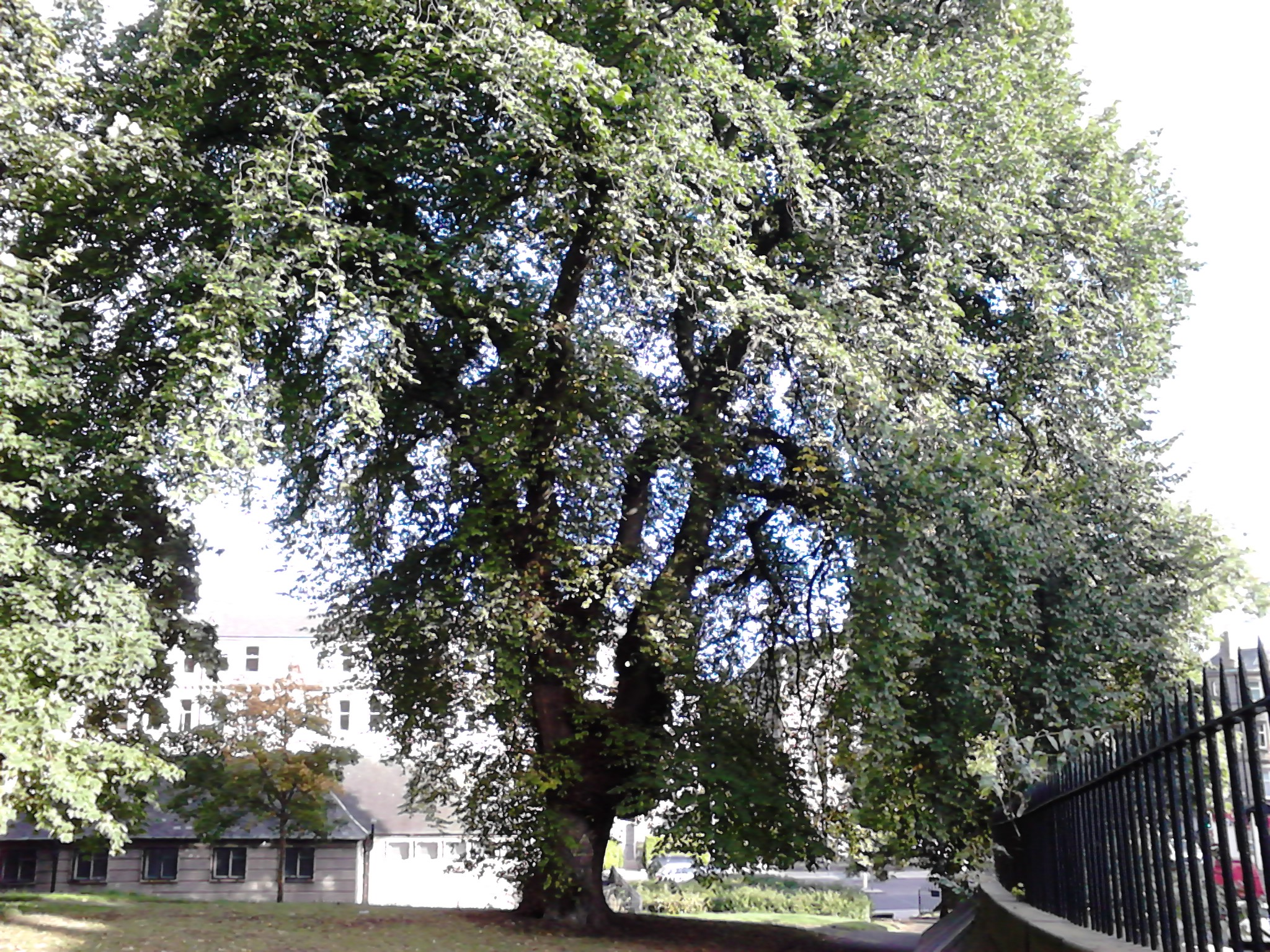
Wych elm at the eastern end of Royal Terrace Gardens, Edinburgh

London Road Gardens (formerly Royal Terrace Gardens) are one of the collection of New Town Gardens located close to the city centre of Edinburgh in the New Town, part of the UNESCO World Heritage Site inscribed in 1995. They occupy a long strip of land from east to west along the lower northern slope of Calton Hill, with an area of 4.37 hectares (10.8 acres). The gardens are notable for their large, old trees including limes and some fine, surviving elms, also spring flowers, particularly daffodils.

== History ==
Royal Terrace Gardens were designed by the architect William Henry Playfair, as part of his plan for the Eastern, or third New Town, approved by a committee on 27 September 1819. They formed the slope below Royal Terrace and Carlton Terrace (also designed by Playfair) preserving the view from these streets.

The site originally contained two quarries, and Playfair decided to fill these in, landscaping the gardens, using earth excavated in the course of building of the terraces above. Eventually the land was fenced, landscaped and planted with trees in 1829.

Following the arrival of the deposed King Charles X of France in October 1830, a special footpath was added through the gardens to enable him to walk between his residence in Holyrood Palace and the Catholic cathedral of St Mary's in Picardy Place at the top of Leith Walk.

== Management ==
The gardens were, and are, owned by the George Heriot's Hospital. They are leased to the City of Edinburgh Council for public use on condition that they are maintained in good order, to be used only as "pleasure grounds with walks". No trees may be removed without consent. The lease is renewed at 25 year intervals.

== Royal Terrace Gardens' House ==
Playfair also designed a gardeners cottage for the west end of the gardens which was built in 1836 when it was known as the Royal Terrace Gardens' House. It is now used as a restaurant.

== See also ==
- William Henry Playfair
- Calton Hill
- Regent Terrace
- Royal Terrace, Edinburgh
- Carlton Terrace, Edinburgh
- Regent, Royal and Carlton Terrace Gardens
