= Frances Mary Colquhoun =

Scottish writer

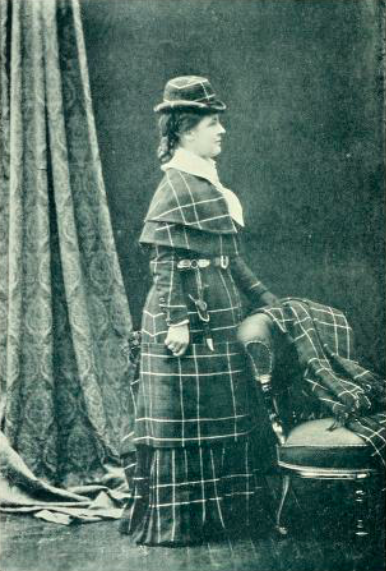
- Born: 28 February 1836
- Died: 29 July 1920 (aged 84)
- Occupation: Writer

Frances Mary Colquhoun (28 February 1836 – 29 July 1920) was a Scottish writer.

== Early life ==
Known as Mary, she was born in Edinburgh in 1836, the eldest daughter and second child of John Colquhoun and Frances Sarah Fuller Maitland. Her father was a sportsman, author of The Moor and the Loch and former army officer. Her mother was the author of Rhymes and Chimes.

She grew up in Duddingston and then Royal Terrace, Edinburgh in a "sternly Presbyterian" and well-connected family. She and her siblings also spent time in stately homes in England and Scotland.

She had four sisters and four brothers. Her sister Lucy Bethia Walford became a popular Victorian novelist, and wrote about the family in Recollections of a Scottish Novelist. Her aunt was the Scottish novelist Catherine Sinclair.

== Clan and the Highlands ==
Mary was the granddaughter of Sir James Colquhoun, Baronet of Luss and Clan Chief of the Colquhouns of Luss. She was 'intensely Highland in her sympathies, and to her there is no place so romantic or beautiful as the country of her clan, stretching along "The Bonnie Banks o' Loch Lomon'." Luss is on the west bank of Loch Lomond.

== Later life and litigation ==
Mary never married. She was president of St. Kessog's Home, Edinburgh which was devoted to the treatment of women's diseases.

By his will, her father gave her the use and possession of the family home, 1 Royal Terrace, Edinburgh, so long as she remained unmarried. In 1916 she unsuccessfully bought a claim against the trustees appointed under her father's will to recover costs on repairs, insurance and fees she had spent in respect of the house.

== Works ==
Writing under the name F. Mary Colquhoun, Mary wrote articles for The Scots Magazine, poetry, which was quoted in the 1891 book, One Hundred Modern Scottish Poets and books. She wrote several Highland sketches and collected Christian poems and songs. She also collected lost verses of The Bonnie Banks of Loch Lomond.

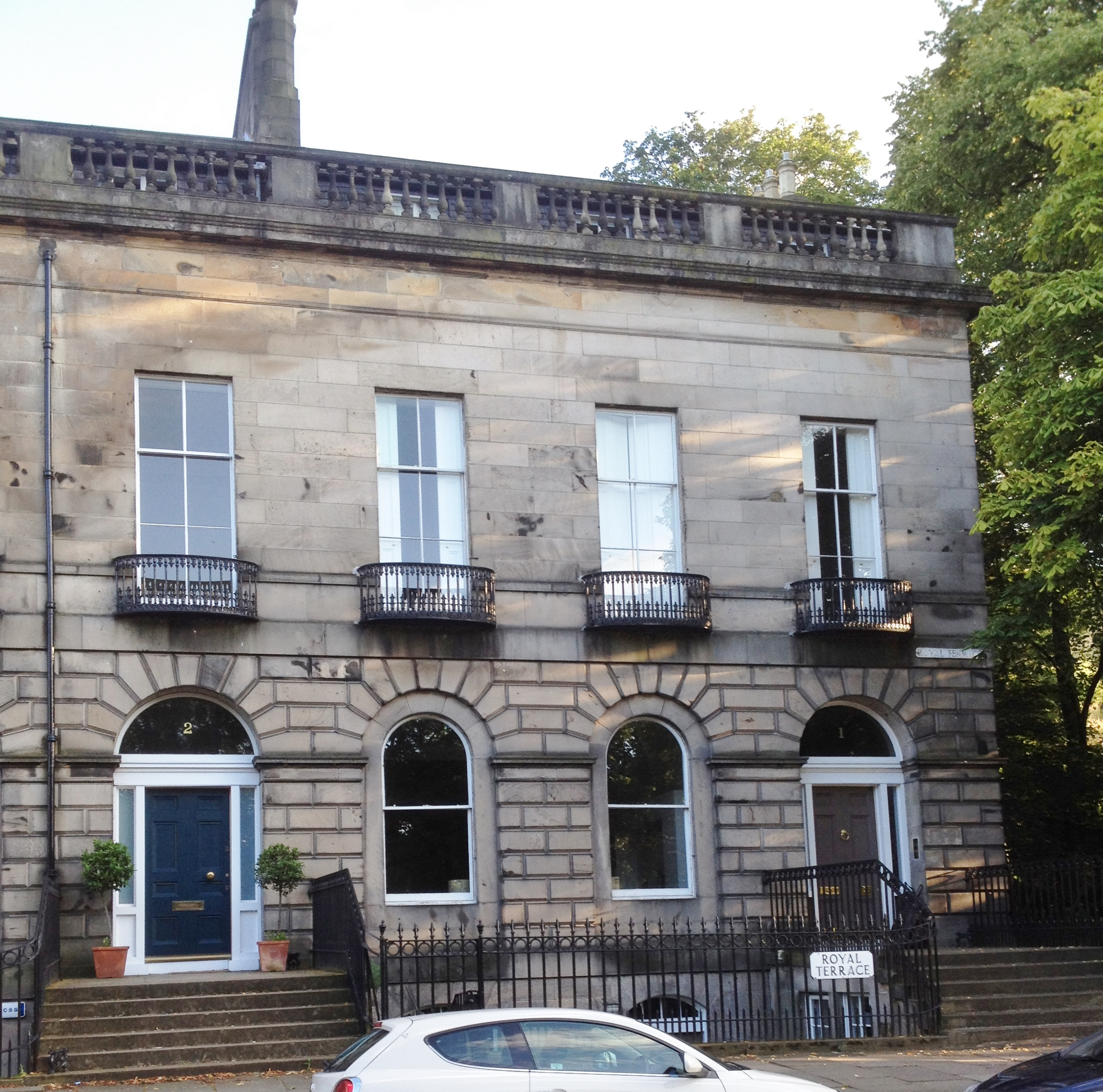
1 Royal Terrace, Edinburgh

Her works include:

- Songs of Christian Warfare (1886)
- A Communion Afternoon
- John Colquhoun: The Christian Sportsman (1891)
- The Wine of Life: A book of the Songsmiths (1894)
- Ridley Herschel: a Jewish witness to the Gospel
- St. Kessog and his home (1908)
- A Bit of the Tartan or Two Fragments of Romance - (1895) includes The Master of Rosca and Glenroysdale
- Clan Colquhoun Society ... Constitution, office-bearers, list of members, and reports; also traditions of the Clan Colquhoun country, illustrated ... portraits and biographical sketches of prominent members of the clan (1897)

== Reviews ==
Songs of Christian Warfare. "... a neat little volume of carefully selected poems which has just been issued by Miss F. Mary Colquhoun, who is already favourably known as the author of "The Master of Rosca," "Glenroysdale' and the "Communion Afternoon." The pieces have been chosen "not so much because they are favourites of the compiler as because she has found them suited to impart comfort and encouragement to others in our common pilgrimage and warfare of faith" and the book, which is beautifully printed and well bound, deserves a most kindly reception."
