= Regent, Royal and Carlton Terrace Gardens =

Coordinates: 55°57′20″N 3°10′42″W

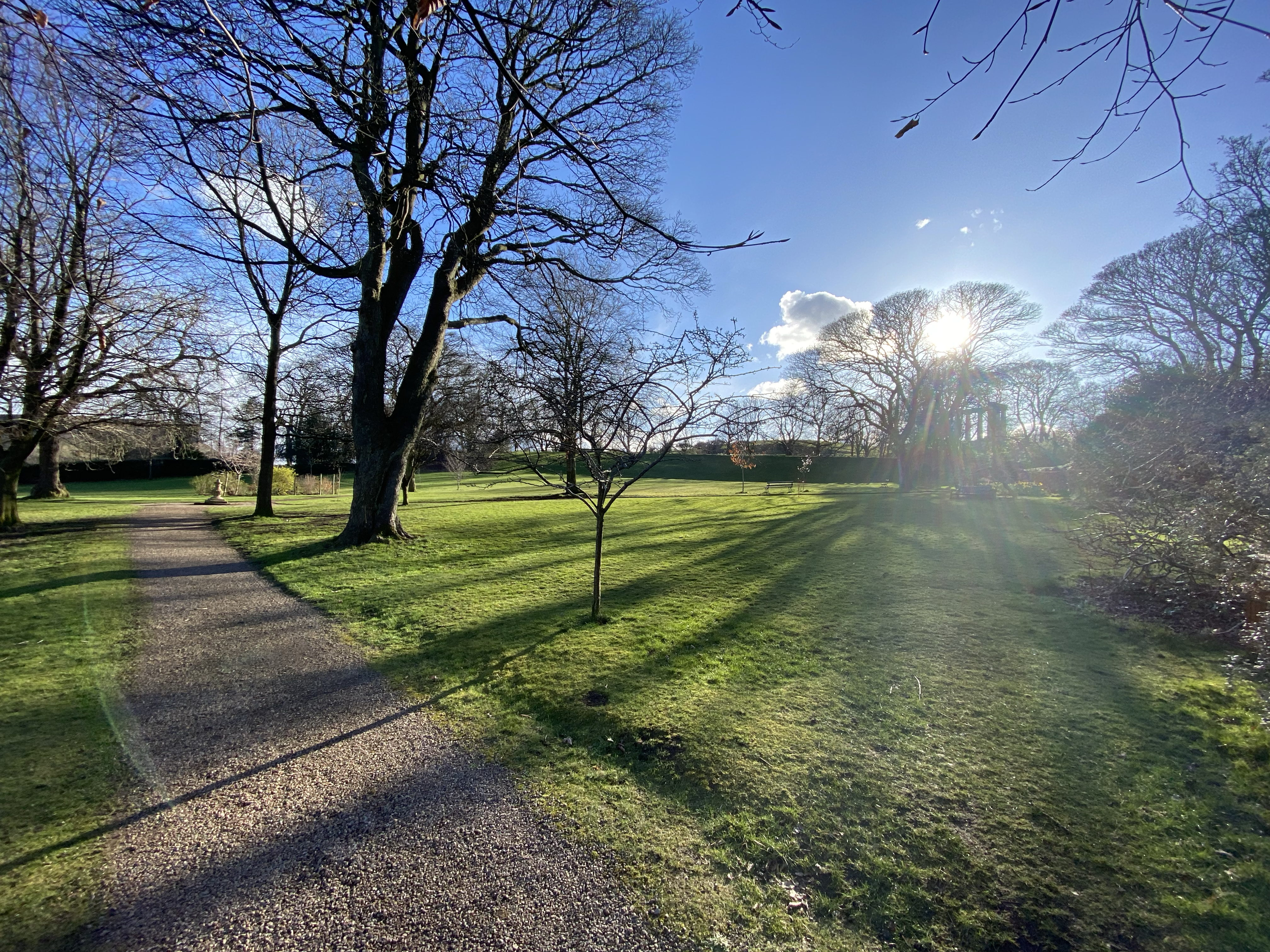
Afternoon in March in the centre of Regent Gardens, Edinburgh

The Regent, Royal and Carlton Terrace Gardens (informally called Regent Gardens, and previously known as the Calton Hill Pleasure Ground and the Large Garden) are private communal gardens in the New Town area of Edinburgh, EH7. They lie over a 4.8-hectare (12-acre) site on the east side of Calton Hill. The gardens have been listed on the Inventory of Gardens and Designed Landscapes as part of the New Town gardens heritage designation since March 2001. The gardens form some of the collection of New Town Gardens.

The gardens are secluded high up on the hill, with impressive views southeast over Holyrood to Arthur's Seat and north across the Firth of Forth to Fife. However, the gardens are secluded and the adjacent properties offer the only close-up view of the landscape. They are the largest and most impressively landscaped of all the gardens in Edinburgh's New Town remaining in private ownership.

== Design and history ==
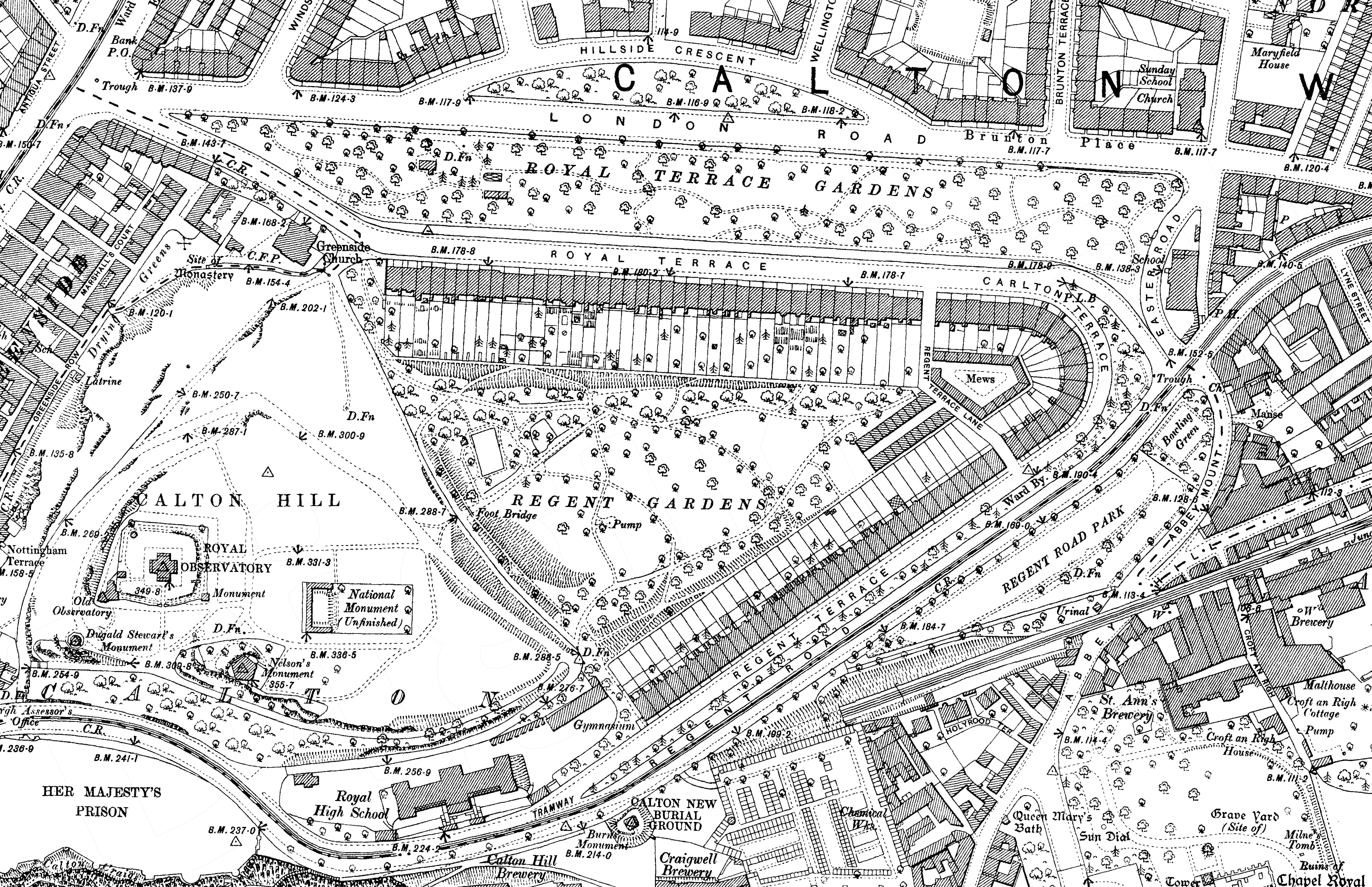
The Regent, Royal and Carlton Terrace Gardens on an ordnance survey map from 1890s

The Regent, Royal and Carlton Terrace Gardens form a roughly triangular plot bordered on its two long sides by the individual domestic gardens of Regent Terrace and Royal Terrace. They include an additional thin strip of land on the opposite (east) side, between Regent and Carlton Terraces and Regent Road.

The gardens were created between 1830 and 1832; the feu having been granted after an agreement that the ground be used for pleasure gardens. The gardens were laid out with the help of the naturalist and gardener Patrick Neill and botanist Robert Graham, the Regius Keeper of the Royal Botanic Garden. The layout of the gardens has remained largely unchanged since its inception.

The layout is broadly divided into a large 2.8-hectare (7-acre) area with six distinct lawns and a smaller 2-hectare (5-acre) area of woodland. The lawns are surrounded with several different species of trees, including an avenue of lime trees, and a series of horse chestnuts along a ha-ha near the Calton Hill boundary wall at the top of the grounds. Various paths covered by trees surround the large lawn area. The woodland area is planted with snowdrops, crocuses, daffodils and bluebells.

Two tennis courts were laid in the north west part of the gardens between 1882 and 1883; these were replaced by a more permanent court in 1889. In 2012, this court area was enlarged and the red brick dust surface was replaced with green asphalt.

== Species ==
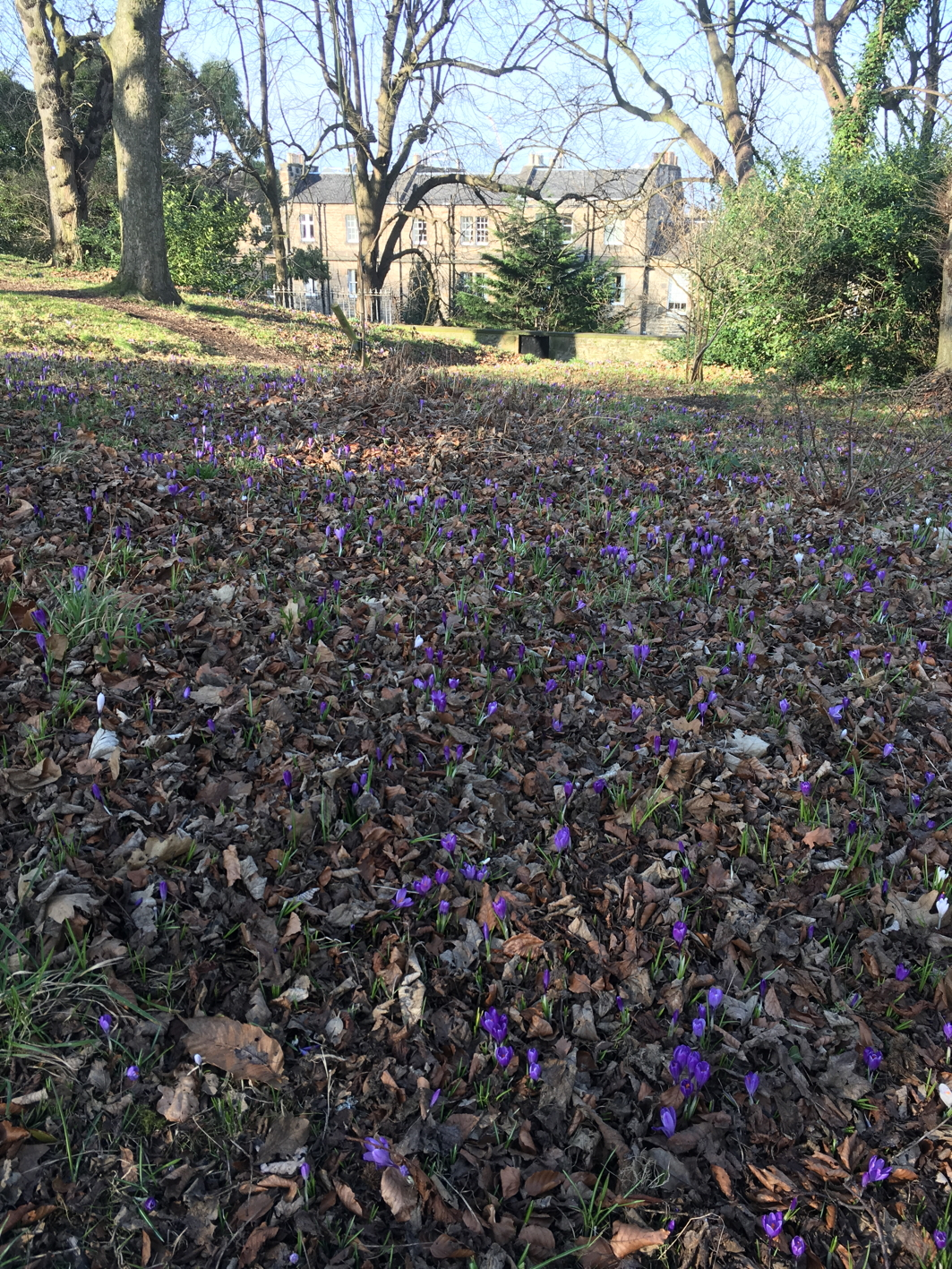
Crocuses in Regent Gardens in February

Some of the older trees date back to the early 19th century. A chestnut tree planted in 1826 lasted until 2011, when it was felled due to disease. The following tree species were recorded in the gardens at the end of the 20th century: ash (Fraxinus excelsior), beech, black poplar (Populus nigra), cherry (Prunus avium), common lime (Tilia × europaea), English elm (Ulmus minor 'Atinia'), hawthorn (Crataegus monogyna), holly, horse chestnut (Aesculus hippocastanum), laburnum (Laburnum anagyroides), Norway maple (Acer platanoides), oak (Quercus robur), rowan (Sorbus aucuparia), silver birch (Betula pendula), small leafed lime (Tilia cordata), sweet chestnut (Castanea sativa), sycamore (Acer pseudoplatanus), tulip tree (Liriodendron tulipifera), whitebeam (Sorbus aria), white poplar (Populus alba), and wych elm (Ulmus glabra).

== Management ==
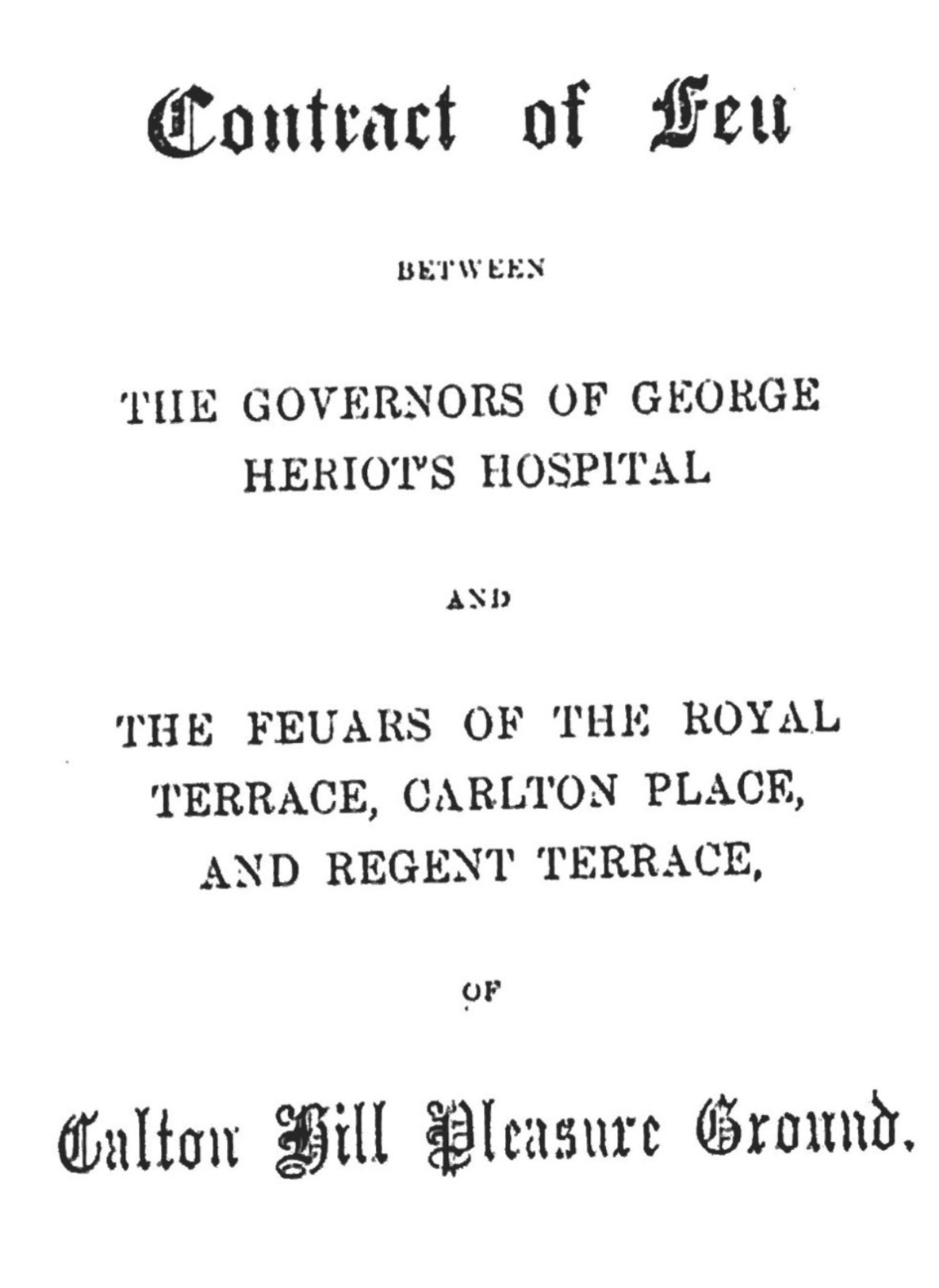
Title page for the Contract of Feu of 1836 for Calton Hill Pleasure Ground

The management of the gardens is governed by a Local Act of Parliament, the Regent, Royal and Carlton Terrace Gardens, Edinburgh Order Confirmation Act 1970, which received Royal Assent in May 1970, based on the original Contract of Feu of 1836.

The gardens are looked after by the Regent Royal and Carlton Terrace Gardens Association. The journalist and editor Arnold Kemp wrote of his experiences serving on the association committee in the 1970s in a 1993 article for The Herald.

The gardens are publicly accessible each year through the Doors Open Days scheme.

=== Gallery ===
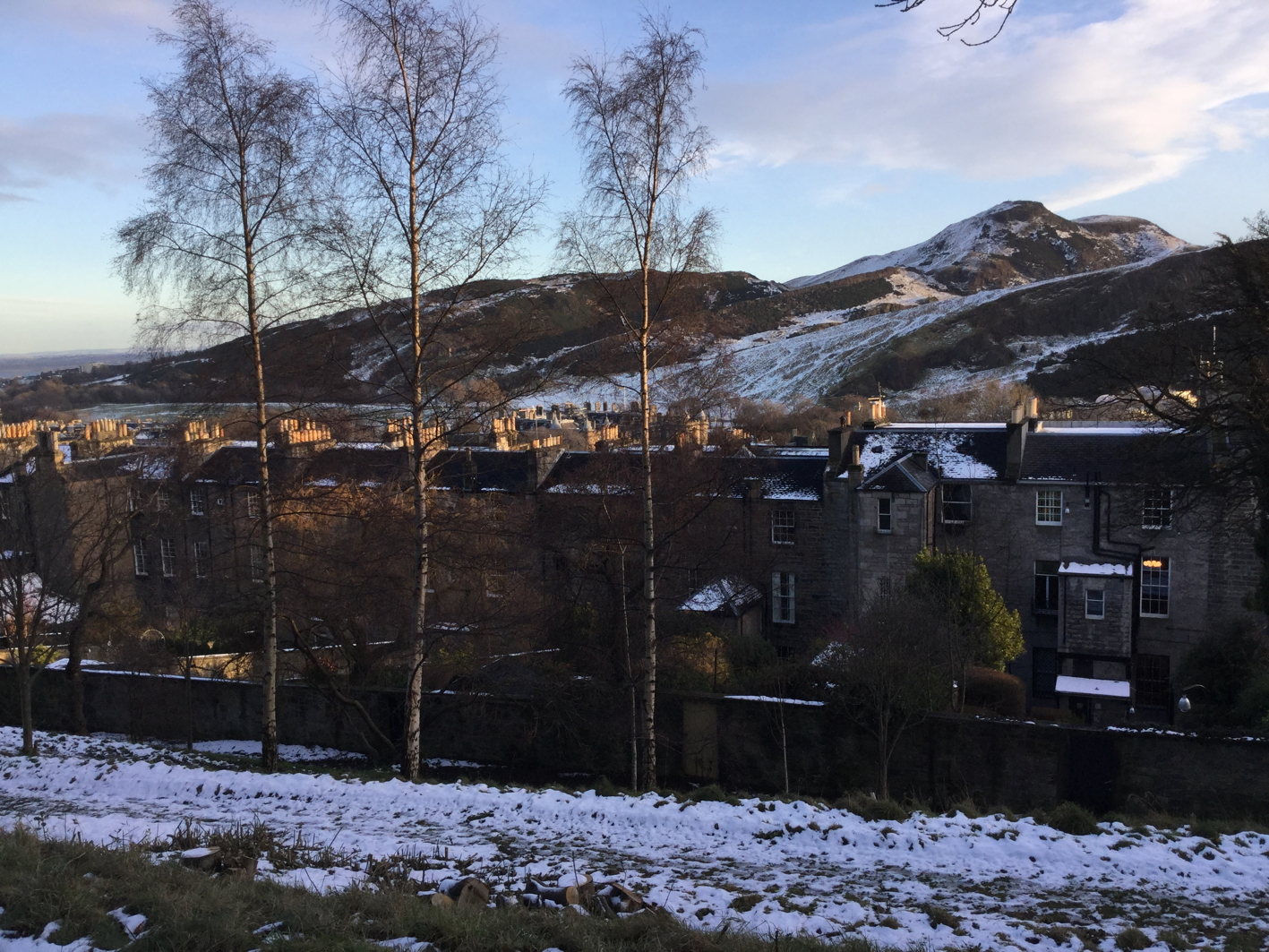
Winter view from Regent Gardens, across Regent Terrace, and up to Arthur's Seat

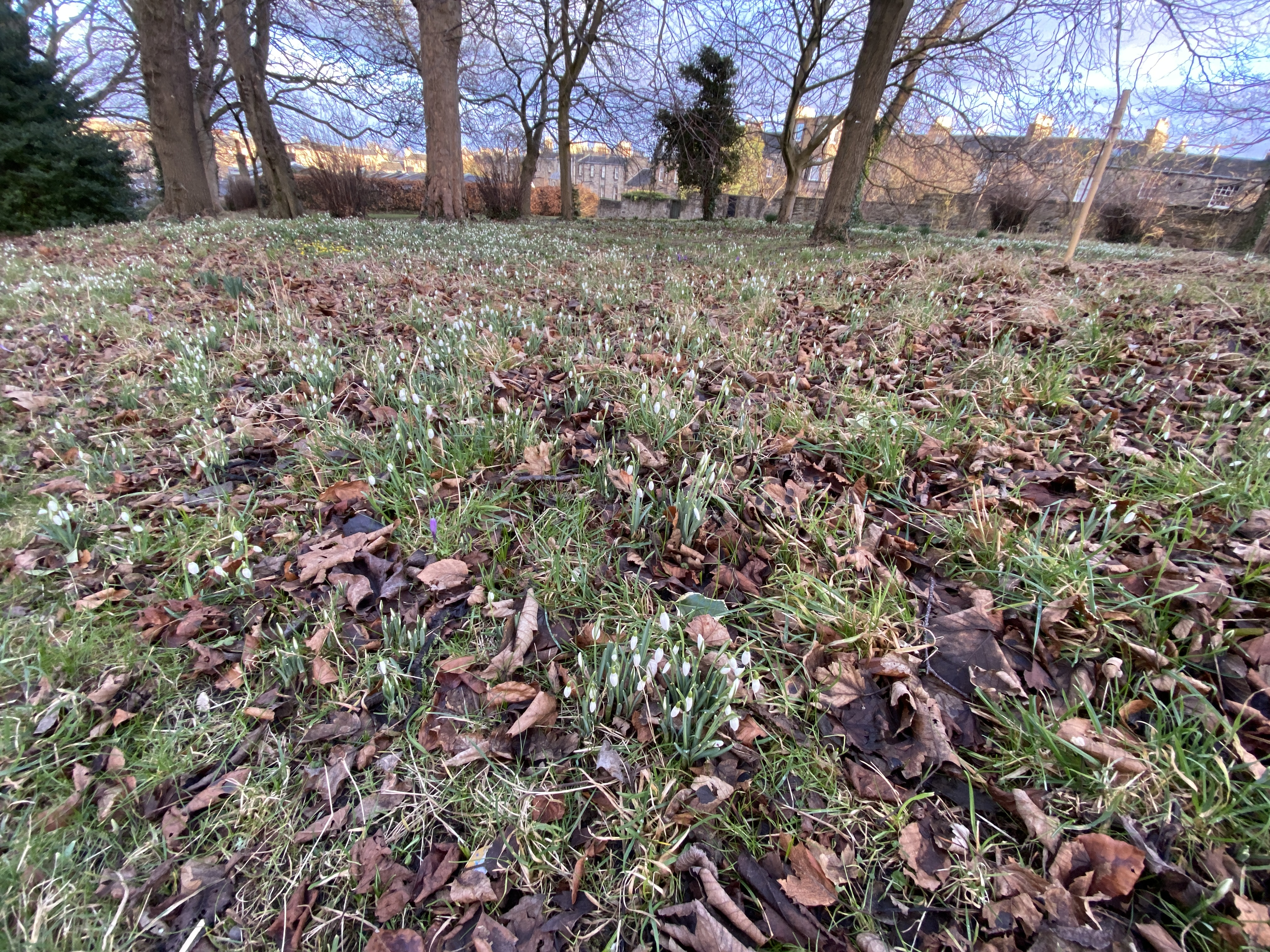
Snowdrops in Regent Gardens, Edinburgh on 7 February 2025

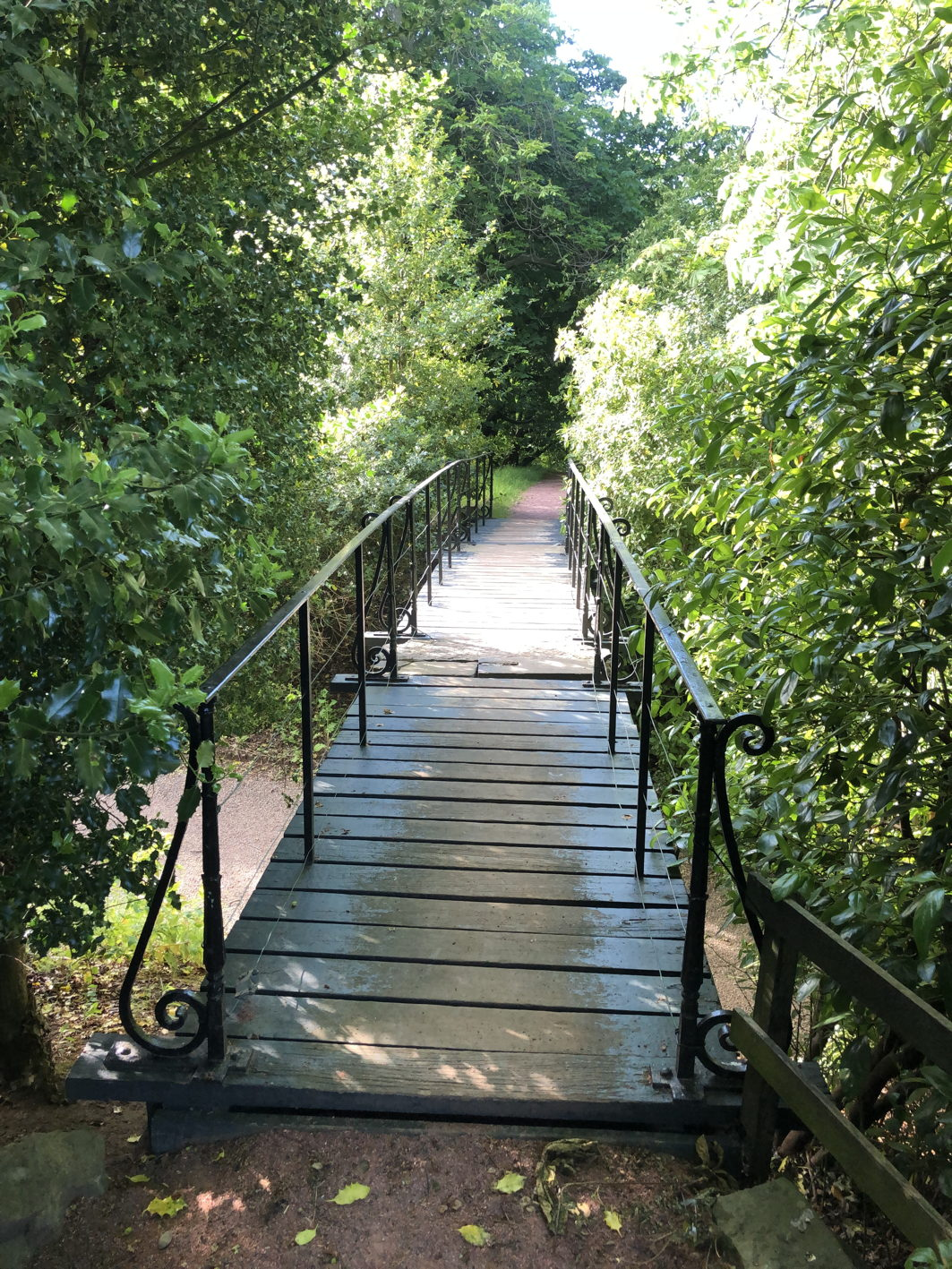
Bridge alongside the ha-ha in Regent Gardens, Edinburgh

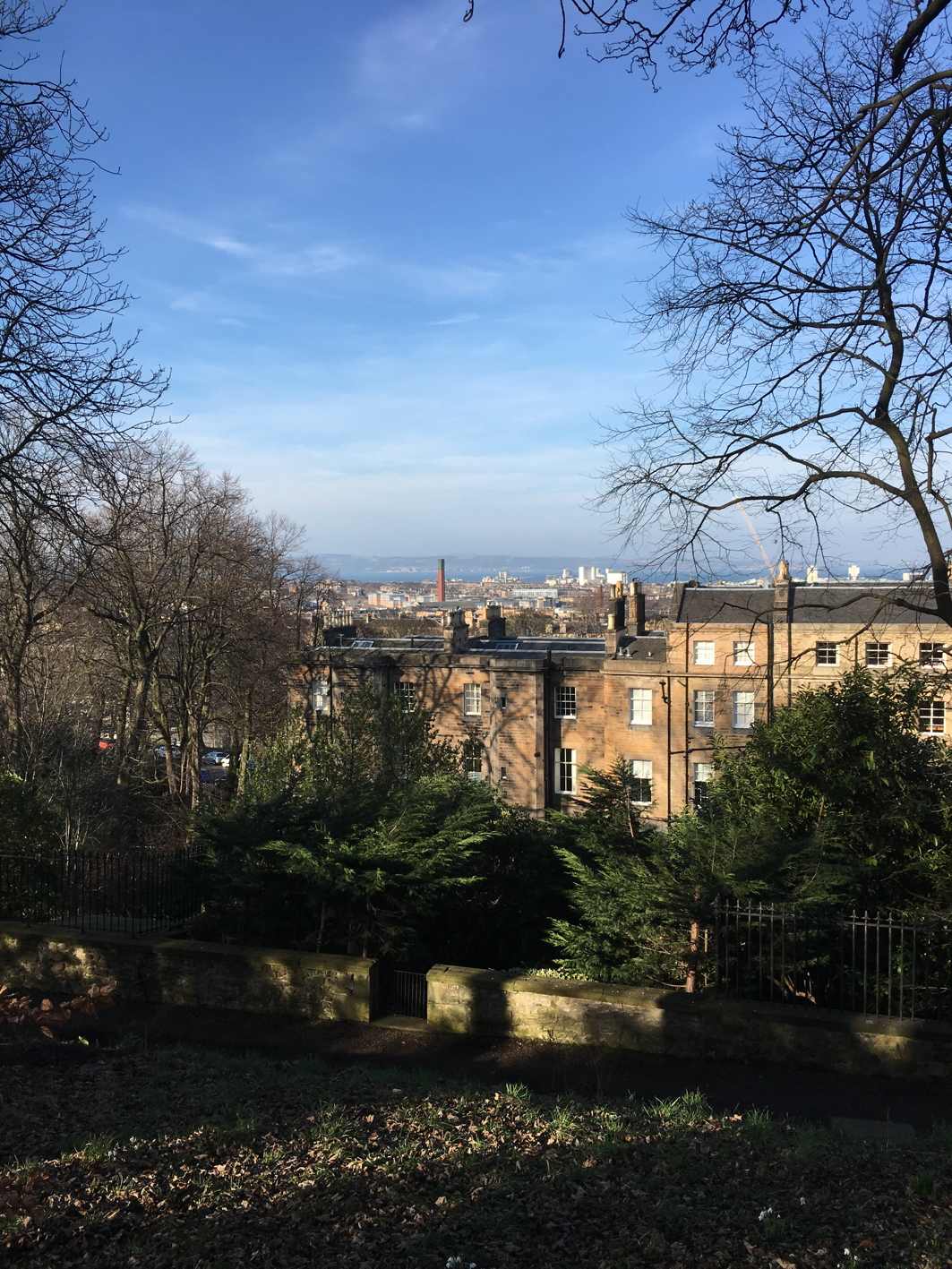
From Regent Gardens looking north

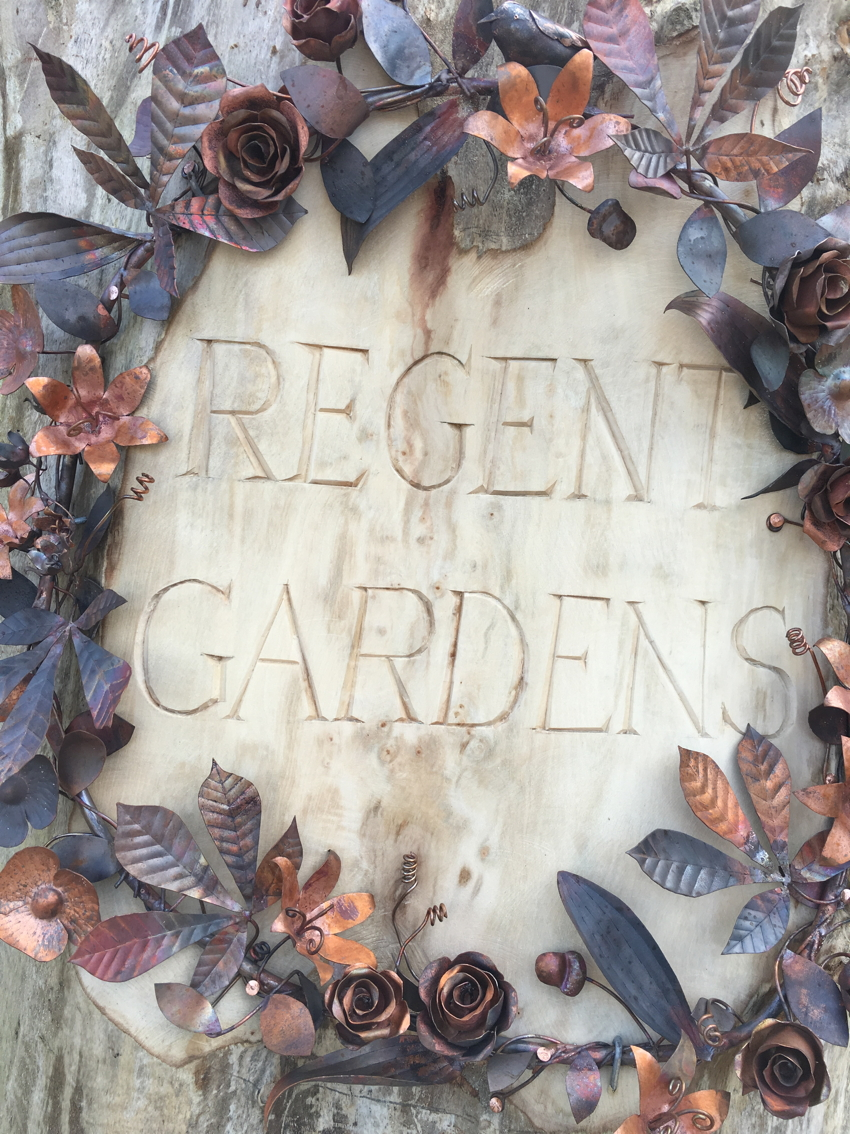
Sign by the west entrance to Regent Gardens

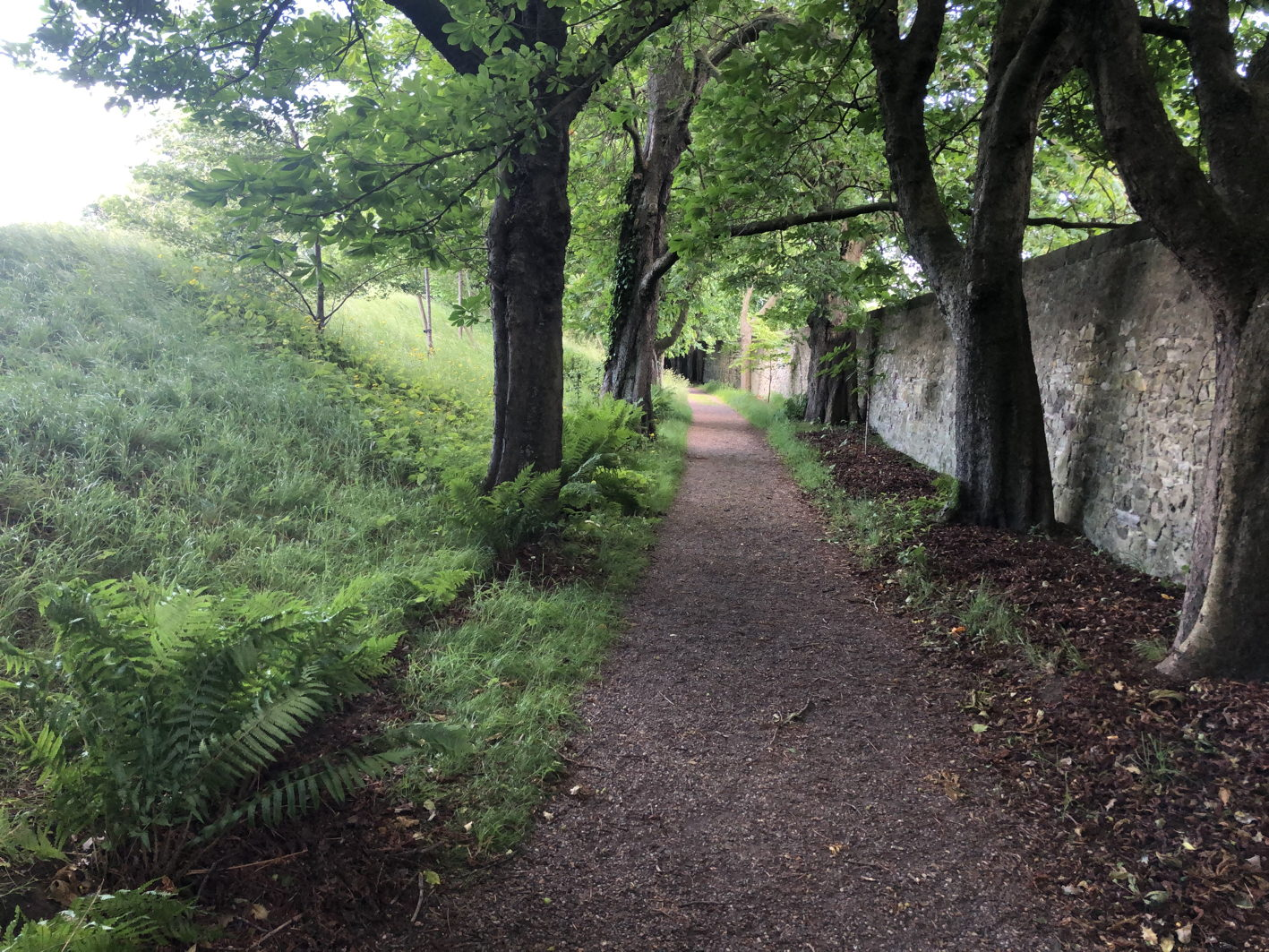
Ha-ha in Regent Gardens, planted with horse chestnuts

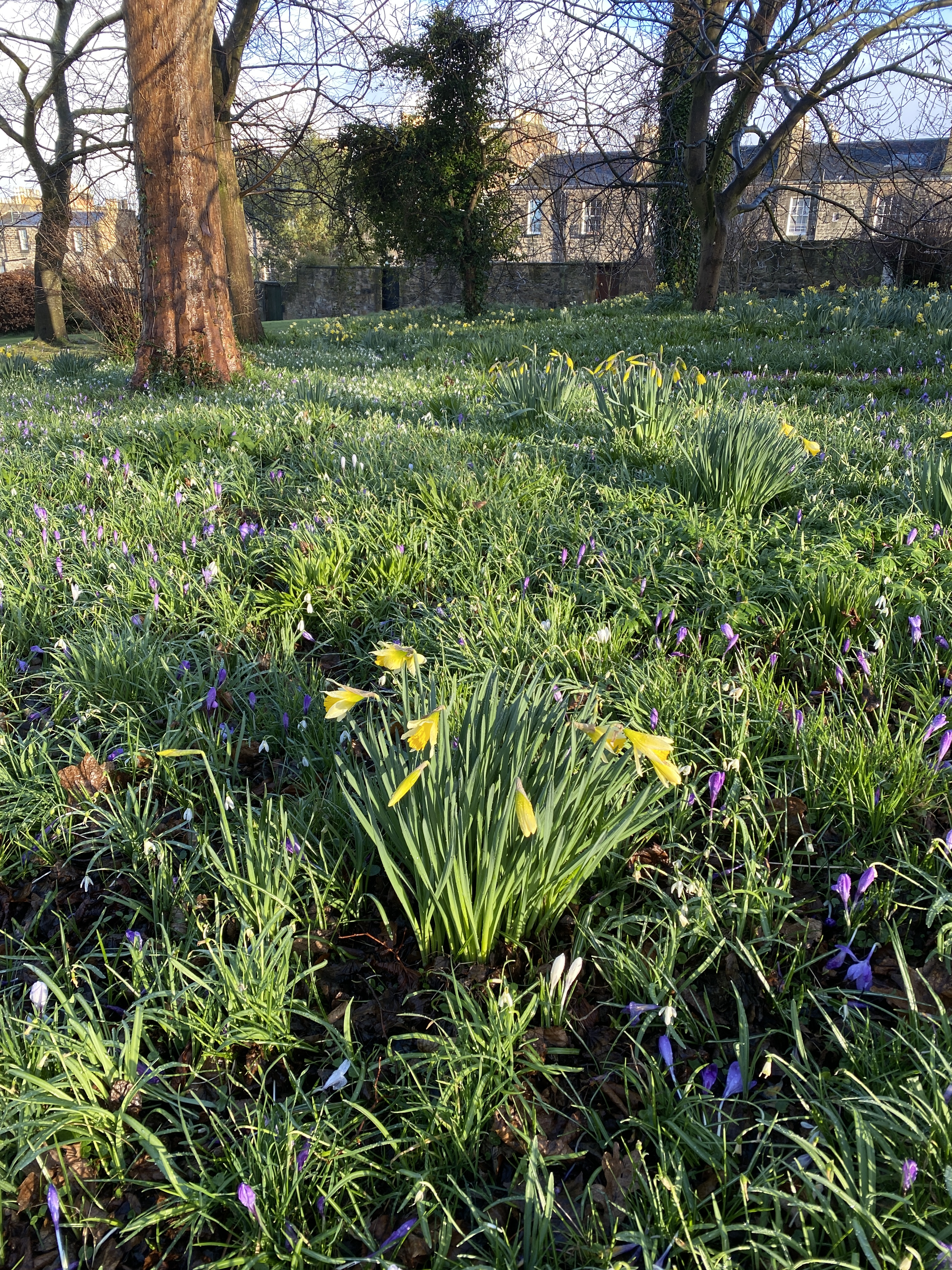
Spring bulbs in Regent Gardens, Edinburgh on 15 March 2026

== Bibliography ==
- Byrom, Connie (2005). The Edinburgh New Town Gardens. Edinburgh: Birlinn Limited. pp. 325–336. ISBN 978-1-84158-402-7.
- Mitchell, Anne (1993). The People of Calton Hill. Edinburgh: Mercat Press, James Thin. pp. 117–127. ISBN 1-873644-18-3.

== See also ==
- Calton Hill
- Calton Hill Conservation Trust
- Regent Terrace
- Carlton Terrace, Edinburgh
- Royal Terrace, Edinburgh
- William Henry Playfair
