= Martin C. Strong =

Scottish discographer

- Born: Martin Charles Strong; 1960 (age 64–65) Musselburgh, Midlothian, Scotland
- Occupation: Music historian
- Children: 3

Martin Charles Strong (born 1960) is a Scottish music historian known for compiling discographies of popular music including The Great Rock Discography. Strong has been described in broadsheet newspaper profiles as a "compiler of acclaimed mammoth discographies" and "a man who knows more about rock music than is healthy for one individual".

== Career ==
Strong has researched music extensively since the early 1980s, dedicating 70 hours per week to his craft as of 2004.

Strong wrote The Great Rock Discography, with the seventh edition being published in 2004; the foreword was penned by disc jockey John Peel. The book has garnered acclaim, with American music critic Robert Christgau recommending it as one of the three best rock music encyclopaedias, and the one with the "maddest completism". Author Ian Rankin named it as one of the "5 Books Every Man Should Read", calling it "a great book" that "would keep [him] happy on any desert island". It was re-released as The Essential Rock Discography, a condensed version, in 2006.

Strong has also authored The Great Metal Discography (2 editions), The Great Psychedelic, The Great Alternative & Indie (2 volumes) and Lights, Camera, Soundtracks (with Brendon Griffin). Along with The Great/Essential Rock Discography – on which Griffin also worked sporadically – these titles have been published by Canongate Books. Mercat Press published a history of Scottish contemporary music, The Great Scots Musicography, in 2002. Strong's final tomes were two volumes of The Great Folk Discography, published by Birlinn in 2010 and 2011; a third part of the trilogy, The Great Folk Discography: The Celtic Connections, has been shelved.

Aside from his books, Strong has written for The List, Record Collector, Songlines, HMV Choice and the Rough Guides series. He served as researcher for Jimmy Cliff's 2003 Anthology release.

== Personal life ==
Strong lives in Falkirk and has three daughters.
