= Francis Chalmers Crawford =

Scottish stockbroker and amateur botanist and ornithologist (1851–1908)

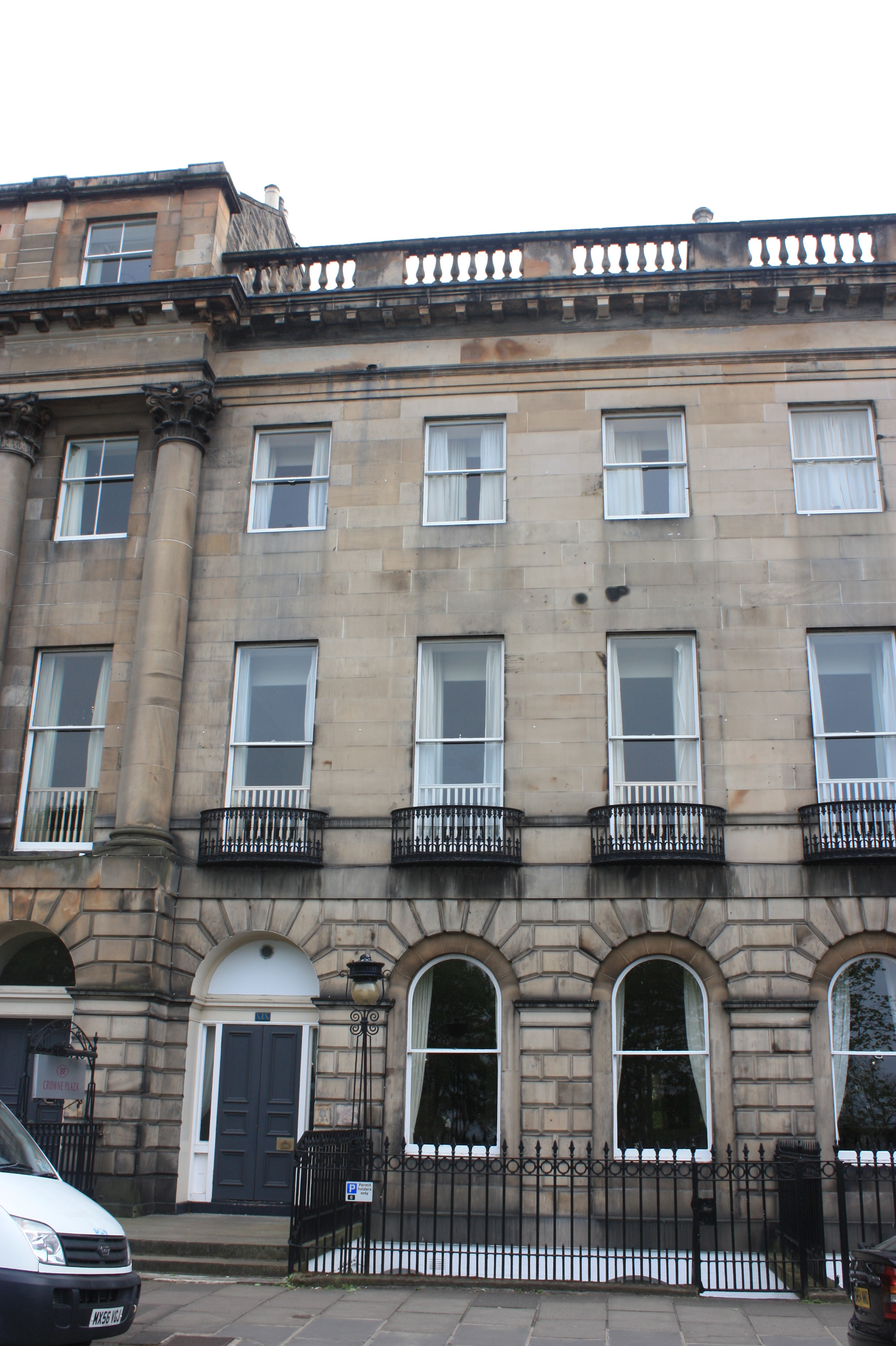
Crawford's impressive townhouse at 19 Royal Terrace, Edinburgh

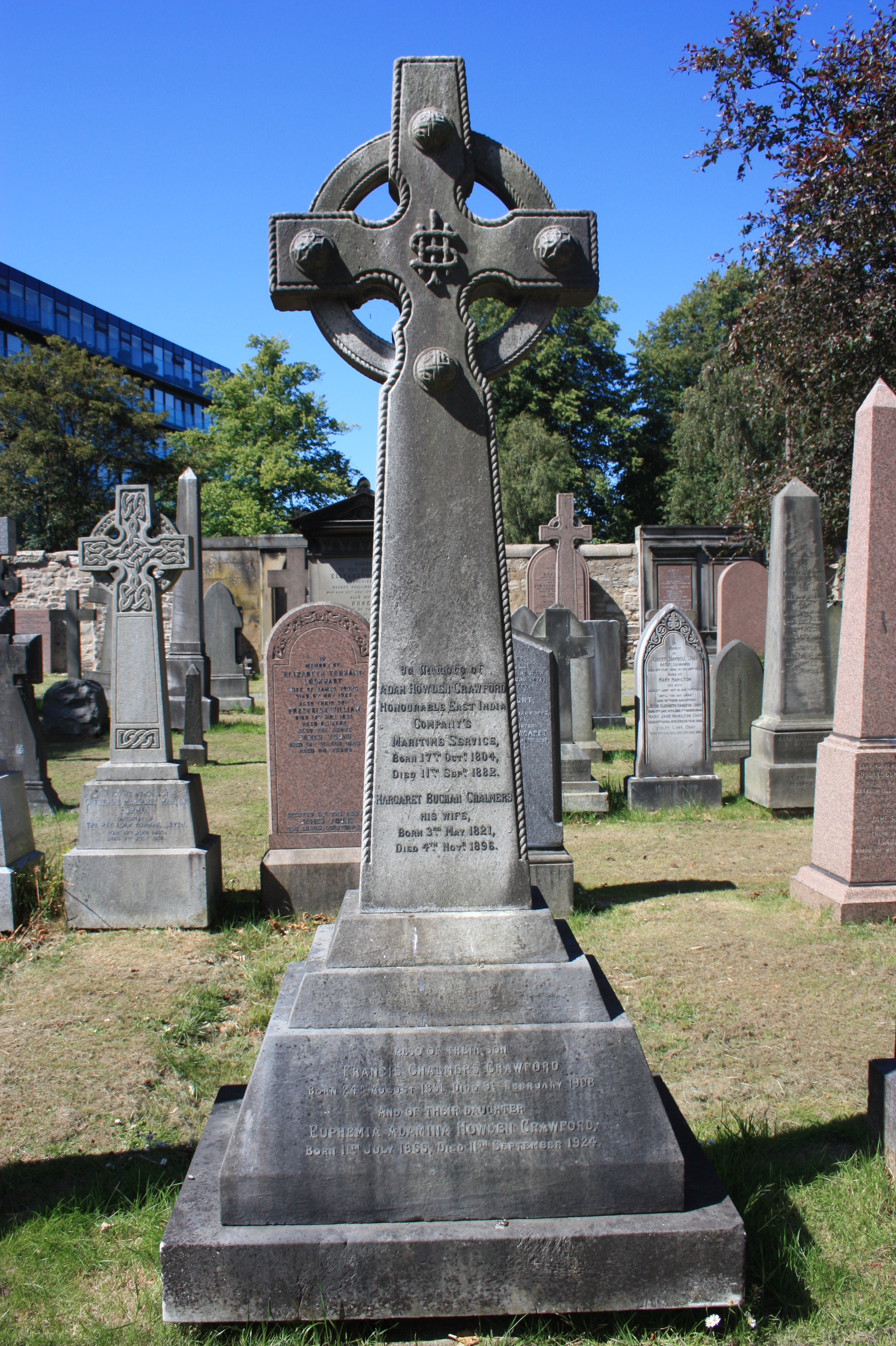
The monument to Francis Chalmers Crawford, Dean Cemetery

Francis Chalmers Crawford FRSE (1851–1908) was a Scottish stockbroker of fame as an amateur botanist and ornithologist. Saxifraga crawfordii is named after him. He served as President of the Scottish Microscopical Society.

He was an avid collector of plant species, especially Bryophytes and Spermatophytes, notably in Perthshire and Orkney but representing almost all areas of the United Kingdom. He often worked in partnership with Harold Stuart Thompson. He also collected in Hungary, Switzerland and Sweden with his friend John Hutton Balfour, many of his specimens being in the Natural History Museum, London.

== Life ==
He was born in North Berwick on 24 August 1851, the son of Adam Howden Crawford (1804–1882) of the Honourable East India Company, and his wife Margaret Buchan Chalmers (1821–1898).

He attended Edinburgh Academy 1863–68 and then trained as a stockbroker.

He retired in 1896 and began to focus fully on his botanical interests. In 1897 he became a Fellow of the Botanical Society of Edinburgh and demonstrated Botany at an academic level at the Royal Botanic Garden Edinburgh. In 1898 he was elected a Fellow of the Royal Society of Edinburgh. His proposers were Ramsay Heatley Traquair, Sir Isaac Bayley Balfour, James Geikie and John Chiene.

In his final years he lived at 19 Royal Terrace, an impressive Georgian townhouse designed by William Henry Playfair on Calton Hill.

He died on 9 February 1908. He is buried with his parents and sister near the centre of the original north 19th century extension to Dean Cemetery in western Edinburgh beneath a Celtic cross. The grave lies in the south-west section.

== Publications ==
- Anatomy of British Carices (published posthumously, 1910)
