= Janet Colquhoun =

British religious writer

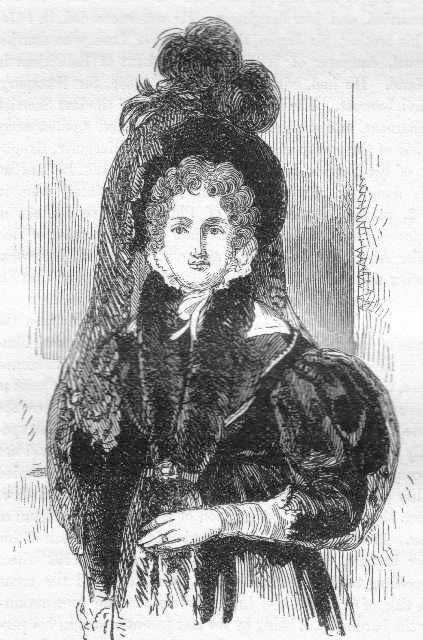
- Portrait from her biography
- Born: 17 April 1781; London, England
- Died: 21 October 1846 (aged 65); Helensburgh, Scotland
- Spouse: Sir James Colquhoun, 3rd Bt
- Writing career
- Subject: Religion

Janet Colquhoun (/kəˈhuːn/ kə-HOON; née Sinclair; also known as Lady Colquhoun of Luss; 17 April 1781 – 21 October 1846) was a British religious writer. She was a philanthropist who was involved with several good causes. She believed that the "fruits of faith will be evident in good work".

== Early life ==
Janet Sinclair was born in London, the second daughter of Sir John Sinclair, and his wife Sarah (d. 1785). Her mother was the only child and heir of Alexander Maitland of Stoke Newington. Her father was a member of Parliament for Caithness. She and her sister were brought up by her paternal grandmother at Thurso Castle. Sinclair became a Christian evangelist after being inspired by the abolitionist William Wilberforce.

Her name became Colquhoun when she married in 1799 Sir James Colquhoun of Luss, a Scottish aristocratic major, and she was happy that in 1816 he became an elder of the Scots church. She was not comfortable being a privileged aristocrat and found the prejudices of her social circle painful.

== Philanthropist ==
Colquhoun was a philanthropist and she founded a small domestic college at her house where young girls could learn about cookery and needlework. Colquhoun's teaching were valued by the students at the college and this made a change from her experience when she had tried earlier to read the Bible to some of her own staff.

Rossdhu mansion was the family seat.

James and Janet Colquhoun had five children and a house in Charlotte Square in Edinburgh. The two boys were educated in Edinburgh and Lincolnshire before attending Edinburgh University. Her youngest son, John, went into the army and became a notable sports writer. She became a philanthropist supporting a number of worthy causes. Her religious enthusiasm led her to give up both novels and the theatre in the early nineteenth century and in 1811 she is said to have celebrated her 30th year by saying goodbye to her youth with no regret.

Colquhoun was interested in a variety of good causes and published a number of religious works anonymously. She was treasurer to the Scottish Gaelic Society as well as being a contributor to the local bible society. She helped the Irish Home Mission as well as helping the supply of education in India. Janet's family funded the local Free Church and it is said that she forced the builders to withdraw their plans to build a special pew for the Colquhoun family.

== Writer ==
After she became ill in 1820 she used her energy to write books with religious themes starting with Despair and Hope in 1822. This explains her religious position using conversation with a dying cottager. Before she became ill, Colquhoun had occupied herself in visiting the poor on their estate. Until her husband died in 1836 she published her books anonymously. Colquhoun defended the principle of Sola fide, justification by faith, but resisted the idea of antinomianism. In a later work Hogg says that she extends this position to note that the "fruits of faith will be evident in good works". In 1842 the first train to travel from Edinburgh to Glasgow was scheduled to run on a Sunday. Colquhoun objected to this so strongly that when she later had to make the same trip, she avoided the two-hour train journey and took two days to travel the same distance by horse instead.

Colquhoun died in Helensburgh in 1846. A memoir of her life was compiled by Reverend James Hamilton from her letters and her diary and published in 1849.

The Scottish novelist and artist Lucy Bethia Walford was her granddaughter.

It has been proposed that Colquhoun and her husband were the models for the character of Rabina and George Colwan in Hogg's The Private Memoirs and Confessions of a Justified Sinner.

== Works ==
- Despair and Hope (1822)
- Thoughts on the Religious Profession (1823)
- Impressions of the Heart (1825)
- The Kingdom of God (1836)
- The World's Religion (1839)

== Exgternal links ==
Media related to Janet Colquhoun at Wikimedia Commons
