= William Stevenson (minister) =

William Stevenson (26 October 1805–14 June 1873) was a Church of Scotland minister and antiquarian who served as professor of Ecclesiastical History at the University of Edinburgh.

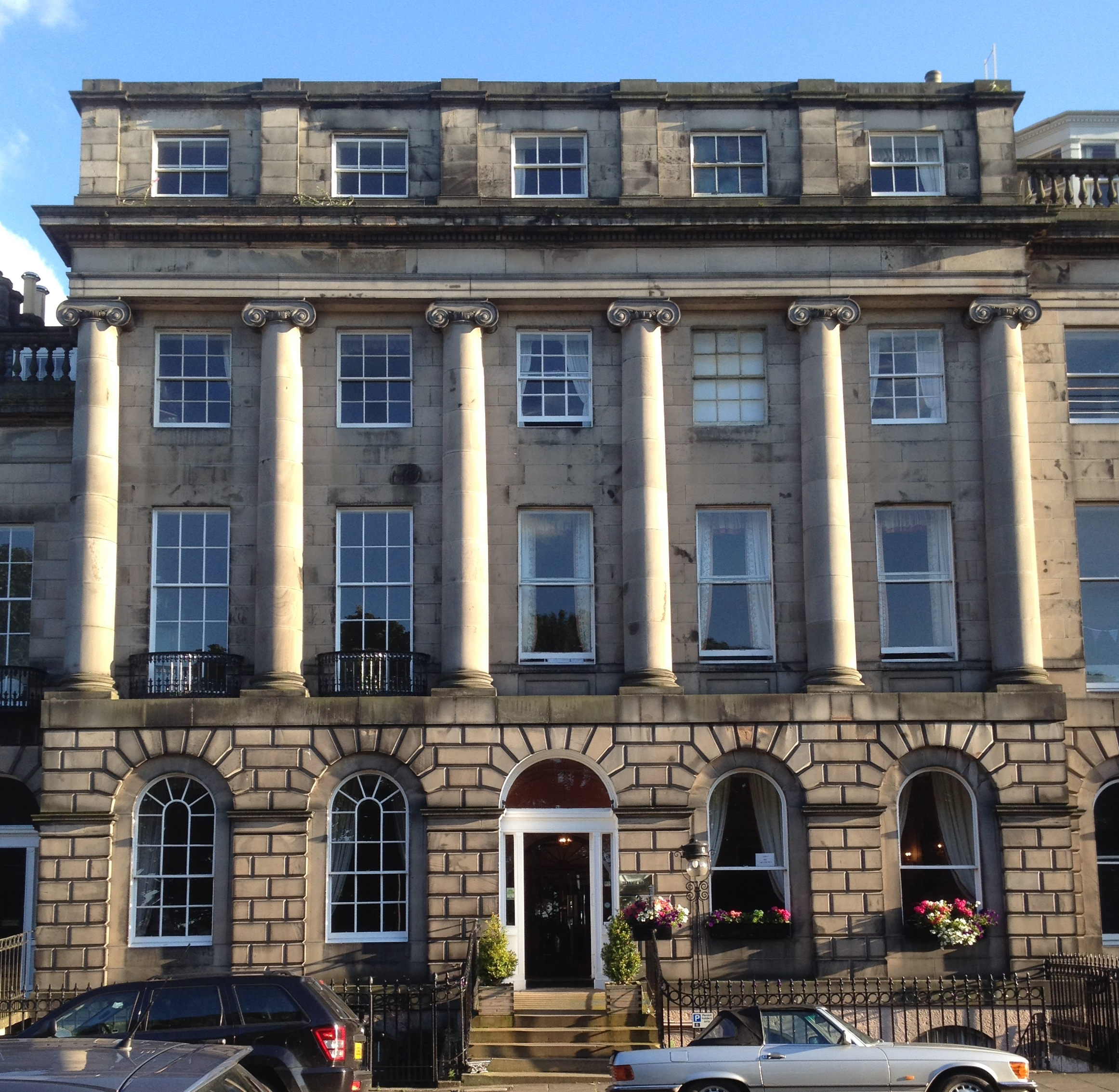
37 Royal Terrace

== Life ==
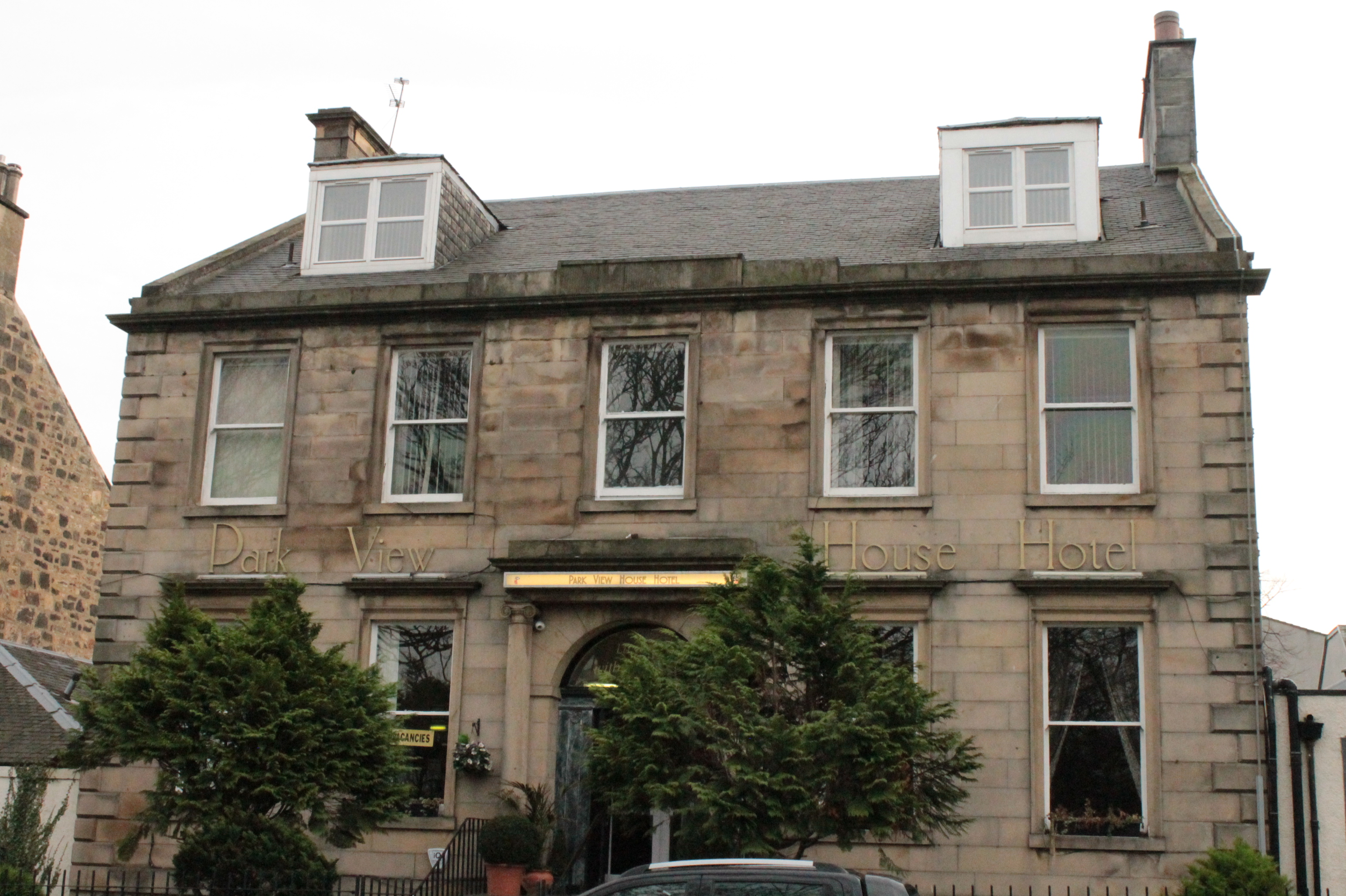
Former South Leith Parish Church manse, 14 Hermitage Place

He was born at Barford in Lochwinnoch on 26 October 1805 the second son of Hugh Stevenson, a farmer. He was educated at the parish school then studied at Glasgow University. He trained as a minister for the Church of Scotland and was licensed to preach by the Presbytery of Paisley in May 1831. He was ordained as minister of Arbroath in October 1833.

From 1844 to 1861 he was minister of South Leith Parish Church, living then at 14 Hermitage Place facing Leith Links. The University of Edinburgh awarded him an honorary doctorate (DD) in 1849.

Under Stevenson's guidance the church was extensively remodelled externally 1847/8, giving it a more contemporary Victorian form, using local architect Thomas Hamilton. This was largely paid for by Stevenson's father-in-law, James Duncan.

In 1858 he was elected a Fellow of the Royal Society of Edinburgh his proposer being James Young Simpson. In 1861 he was created Professor of Ecclesiastical History at the University of Edinburgh. He retired in the summer of 1872 and died at home, 37 Royal Terrace on Calton Hill on 14 June 1873.

== Family ==
He married (1) 25/4/1837 Mary Henderson Aberdein of Montrose (d.1843), with issue (2) 10 June 1845 Mrs Isabella (Duncan) Webster, a widow, daughter of James Duncan shipowner in Leith, with further issue. She outlived him and continued living at 37 Royal Terrace.

== Publications ==
- Christianity and Drunkenness (1851)
- The Legends and Commemorative Celebrations of St Kentigern (1872)
