= Reginald Salmond Curtis =

British Army general

Major-General Sir Reginald Salmond Curtis KCMG CB DSO
- Curtis in 1918
- Born: 21 November 1863; Shoeburyness, Southend-on-sea, Essex, England
- Died: 11 January 1922 (aged 58)
- Military career
- Allegiance: United Kingdom
- Branch: British Army
- Service years: 1883–1920
- Rank: Major-General
- Commands: Royal School of Signals
- Conflicts: Mahdist War; Fourth Anglo-Ashanti War; Second Boer War; First World War
- Awards: Knight Commander of the Order of St Michael and St George; Companion of the Order of the Bath; Distinguished Service Order; Mentioned in dispatches Order of the Medjidie, 4th Class (Ottoman Empire)

Major-General Sir Reginald Salmond Curtis, KCMG, CB, DSO (21 November 1863 – 11 January 1922) was a British Army officer, responsible for the reorganisation and modernisation of the Royal Engineers during the First World War.

== Early life ==
Curtis was the eldest son of Major-General Reginald Curtis, Royal Artillery, and Marianne Emma Salmond. He was educated at Cheltenham College and the Royal Military Academy, Woolwich. He received his commission as a lieutenant in the Royal Engineers in July 1883.

== Career in Africa ==
From 1890 to 1893 Curtis served in the Egyptian Army, and was present at the capture of Tokar, in the Sudan campaign of 1891. In the Ashanti expedition of 1895–6 he served as Director of Telegraphs.

The Second Boer War broke out in South Africa in October 1899. Curtis was at first aide-de-camp to the Engineer-in-Chief, and was afterwards appointed Assistant Director of Telegraphs. He was involved in military operations in the Orange Free State from February to May 1900, including the battles of Paardeberg and Driefontein, and operations at Vet River and Zand River. He served in the Transvaal in May and June 1900, in actions near Johannesburg and Pretoria, then east of Pretoria from July to October 1900, including the action at Belfast, also in Cape Colony south of the Orange River. For his service with the paramilitary South African Constabulary during the later part of the war, he received a brevet promotion to lieutenant-colonel on 22 August 1902.

After the end of the war in June 1902, Curtis remained in South Africa and was promoted to the brevet colonel on 20 February 1907, and the substantive rank of lieutenant colonel, staying there until 1908 as chief staff officer, and then inspector general of the South African Constabulary. He was a member of the Inter Colonial Council of the Transvaal and Orange River Colony.

After returning to Britain, Curtis was posted to Edinburgh and Aldershot before becoming commandant of the Army Signal School on 12 August 1912. He then succeeded Colonel George Henry Fowke as an assistant adjutant general (AAG) at the War Office in April 1913, which saw him promoted to colonel.

== First World War ==
However, when the First World War broke out Curtis was assistant adjutant general at the War Office, where he remained until 1917. Curtis's fellow officer, Major General Sir George Scott-Moncrieff, explained the importance of Curtis's work in a letter to The Times newspaper, dated 16 January 1922:

At the outbreak of war in 1914 . . . the Royal Engineers . . . consisted of 1,831 officers and 24,172 other ranks. At the conclusion of the war the numbers were 17,711 officers and 322,739 other ranks. This enormous increase was not merely a multiplication of existing organizations, but the creation of a vast number of new branches of the Engineers' arm, of a nature previously unforeseen, to suit the advance of science applied to war. Besides the field and fortress and railway companies, with signaling units and field squadrons and bridging trains which had formerly been employed, there were electrical and mechanical companies, tunnelling companies for mining, water supply units, field survey battalions, and sound ranging and observation companies. There were units for land drainage and for inundations. there were sections for field and anti-aircraft searchlights. There were others for forestry, camouflage, meteorology, chemical warfare, and a large number of units for transportation by land and water, such as road and railway companies of many kinds and inland water transport. The raising and organizing of all these units, with their varying requirements and their special officers, was a gigantic task. General Curtis had to work, day after day, in a dark and ill-ventilated room at the war office, and his strength, already weakened by years of valuable service in Africa, was strained beyond recovery. But the units he raised were a notable contribution to the success of the operations . . .

In 1917, Curtis was appointed to command the Cromarty naval base defences, before taking charge of administration at Aldershot.

He retired in 1920, having been promoted to major-general and knighted for his services.

== Family ==
Curtis married the Hon. Hilda Margaret, daughter of Viscount Barrington in 1894, and they had three daughters.
