= John Colquhoun (sportsman) =

Scottish sports man and song writer (1805–1885)

John Colquhoun (6 March 1805 – 27 May 1885) was a sportsman and sportswriter in Scotland.

== Life ==
He was born in Edinburgh to James Colquhoun, 3rd Baronet of Luss, Dunbartonshire and Janet Colquhoun (born Sinclair). Together with his elder brother he was educated first at a school in Edinburgh, subsequently at a private school in Lincolnshire (Rev. Mr. Grainger's of Winteringham), and finally at the University of Edinburgh.

In 1828, he joined the 33rd Regiment in Connaught, Ireland. In 1829, he was promoted to the Fourth Dragoon Guards. He retired from the service after his marriage in 1833, 'and commenced what was termed later by a friend his "Residential tour of Scotland."'

He was always a keen sportsman and an accurate observer of nature, and during his long life he acquired an experience in matters of sport and natural history that was quite exceptional, for the summer quarters were changed almost every year, and the list of places rented by him embraces nearly every district of Scotland, so that his opportunities for observation were especially favourable. In 1840, he embodied his experiences in The Moor and the Loch, which speedily took a high rank among books on Scotch sport. In 1851, the third edition was published, and the fourth, which was not issued until 1878, contained many additions, notably the most valuable portions of some other books he had written in the meantime, Rocks and Rivers, 1849; Salmon Casts and Stray Shots, 1858; and Sporting Days, 1866.

Besides these works he wrote two lectures, "On the Feræ Naturæ of the British Islands,' and 'On Instinct and Reason,' which were published in 1873 and 1874 respectively. It was not until the fifth edition of The Moor and the Loch appeared that the autobiographical introduction, which now forms not the least interesting portion of the book, was prefixed to the text, and a sixth edition was issued in 1884, the year before the author's death.

He died on 27 May 1885 at Royal Terrace, Edinburgh, after a short illness.

== Family ==
On 29 January 1834, he married Frances Sarah Fuller Maitland daughter of Ebenezer Fuller Maitland and Bethia Ellis. John and Frances had four sons and five daughters. His daughter Lucy Bethia Walford, became a well-known Victorian novelist, while F. Mary Colquhoun became a poet and writer.

== Principal works ==
- The Moor and the Loch 1840
- Rocks and Rivers 1849
- Salmon Casts and Stray Shots 1858
- Sporting Days 1866

== Notes ==
Attribution

- This article incorporates text from a publication now in the public domain: Maitland, John Alexander Fuller (1887). "Colquhoun, John (1805-1885)". In Stephen, Leslie (ed.). Dictionary of National Biography. Vol. 11. London: Smith, Elder & Co.
