= Lucy Bethia Walford =

Scottish novelist and artist (1845–1915)

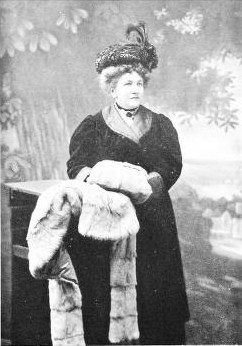
Lucy B. Walford

Lucy Bethia (Colquhoun) Walford (17 April 1845 – 11 May 1915) was a Scottish novelist and artist, who wrote 45 books, the majority of them "light-hearted domestic comedies". Accurate writing was a big consideration for her.

== Life ==
Walford was born Lucy Bethia Colquhoun on 17 April 1845 at Portobello, a seaside resort then outside Edinburgh, the seventh child of Frances Sarah Fuller Maitland (1813–1877), a poet and hymn writer and John Colquhoun (1805–1885) of Luss, Dunbartonshire, author of The Moor and the Loch. Her paternal grandmother, Janet Colquhoun (1781–1846), was a religious writer, and her aunt, Catherine Sinclair (1800–1864) was a prolific novelist and children's writer.

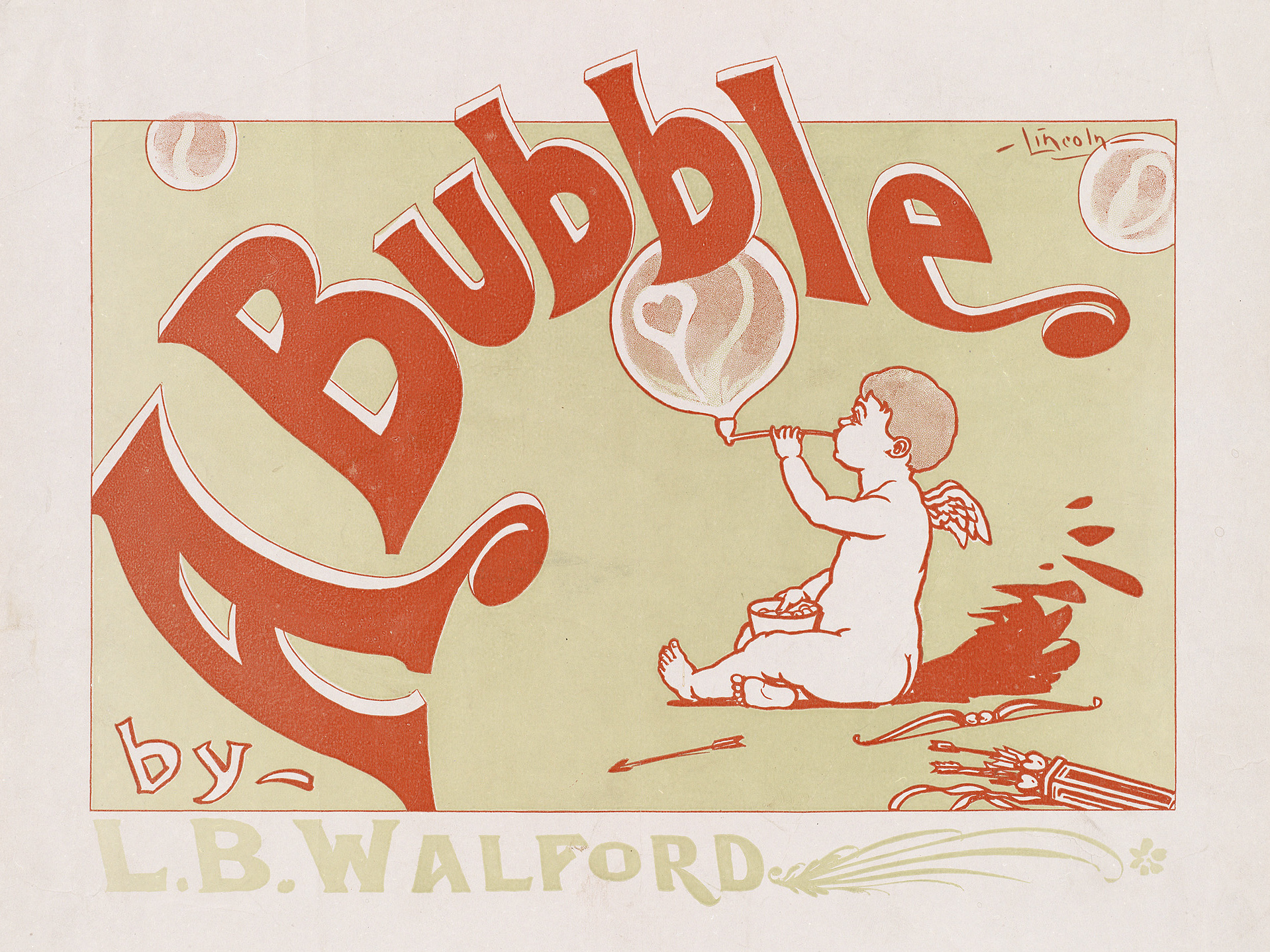
A Bubble by L. B. Walford art poster, c. 1895

Walford was educated privately by German governesses. Her reading included works by Charlotte Mary Yonge and Susan Ferrier, and in later years Jane Austen. The family moved to Edinburgh in 1855, where guests included the artist Noël Paton, who encouraged her to take up painting. In 1868 and several succeeding years she exhibited at the annual exhibition of the Royal Scottish Academy. Her first short piece of writing appeared in the Sunday Magazine in May 1869.

On 23 June 1869 she married Alfred Saunders Walford (died 1907), a magistrate of Ilford, Essex, and they moved to London. They had five daughters and two sons. Their children were said to be "never put aside for her work" and "constantly with their mother". She died on 11 May 1915 at her home in Pimlico, London.

== Works ==
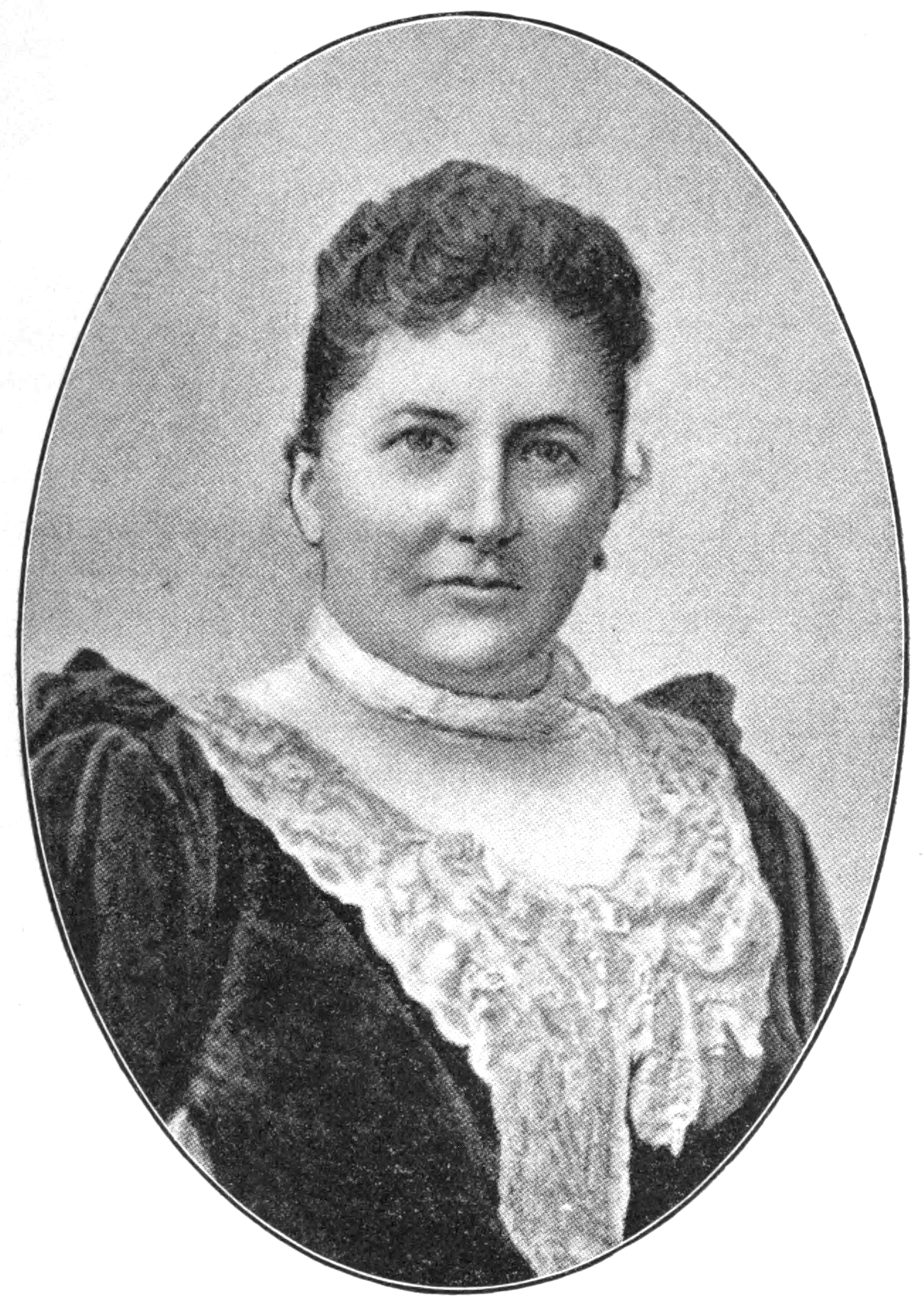
L. B. Walford in 1906

When writing, Walford sought to be as accurate as possible. Her brothers were approached to answer questions she had on military life. Her father was an expert on sports. The protagonist of her first novel, Mr. Smith: a Part of his Life (1874) was taken from an actual man named Smith who was found dead, as described in her novel. It pleased Queen Victoria and led to her being received at court. It was also admired by Coventry Patmore. By the age of 65 Walford had written 45 full-length novels, including Pauline (1877), The Baby's Grandmother (1884), Stiff Necked Generation (1889), and The Havoc of a Smile (1890). She also wrote for London journals. Her last novel, David and Jonathan on the Riviera, appeared in 1914.

== Partial bibliography ==
Fiction:

- Mr. Smith: A Part of His Life (1874)
- Nan and Other Tales (1875)
- Pauline (1877)
- Cousins (1879)
- Troublesome Daughters (1880)
- Dick Netherby (1881)
- The Baby's Grandmother (1885)
- The History of a Week (1886)
- A Stiff-Necked Generation (1888)
- Her Great Idea (1888)
- A Mere Child (1889)
- A Sage of Sixteen (1889)
- Havoc of a Smile (1890)
- The Mischief of Monica (1891)
- The One Good Guest (1891)
- For Grown-up Children (1892)
- The Matchmaker (1893)
- A Question of Penmanship (1893)
- Ploughed (1894)
- A Bubble (1895)
- Frederick (1895)
- Successors to the Title (1896)
- Iva Kildare (1897)
- Leddy Marget (1898)
- The Intruders (1898)
- The Archdeacon (1899)
- Sir Patrick the Puddock (1900)
- A Little Legacy and Other Stories (1900)
- One of Ourselves (1900)
- Charlotte (1902)
- A Dream's Fulfilment (1902)
- David and Jonathan on the Riviera (1914)

Non-fiction

- Twelve English Authoresses (1892)
- Recollections of a Scottish Novelist (London, Williams and Norgate, 1910)
- Memories of Victorian London (London, E. Arnold, 1912)
