= Mercat Press =

Book company

- Parent company: Birlinn
- Founded: 1970
- Country of origin: Scotland
- Headquarters location: Edinburgh
- Publication types: Books
- Nonfiction topics: Outdoors
- Official website: mercat.birlinn.co.uk

Mercat Press is an imprint of the Edinburgh, Scotland-based publishing company Birlinn Limited. It was established in 1970 as a subsidiary of the bookseller James Thin, and published facsimile editions of out-of-print Scottish works, such as the five-volume The Castellated and Domestic Architecture of Scotland by MacGibbon and Ross. Mercat was bought out by its management after James Thin went into administration in 2002, becoming an independent publisher. In 2007, Mercat Press was taken over by Birlinn Limited, another Edinburgh-based publishing house, who now publish outdoor books, such as walking, climbing and cycling guides, under the Mercat imprint.

== Notable authors and works ==
Martin C. Strong

- The Great Scots Discography (2002)
