= Lord Meadowbank =

Lord Meadowbank can refer to:

- Allan Maconochie, Lord Meadowbank (1748–1816)
- Alexander Maconochie, Lord Meadowbank (1777–1861), his son
