= Alexander Lockhart Simpson =

Scottish minister

Alexander Lockhart Simpson (1785–1861) was a Scottish minister who served as Moderator of the General Assembly of the Church of Scotland in 1849/50.

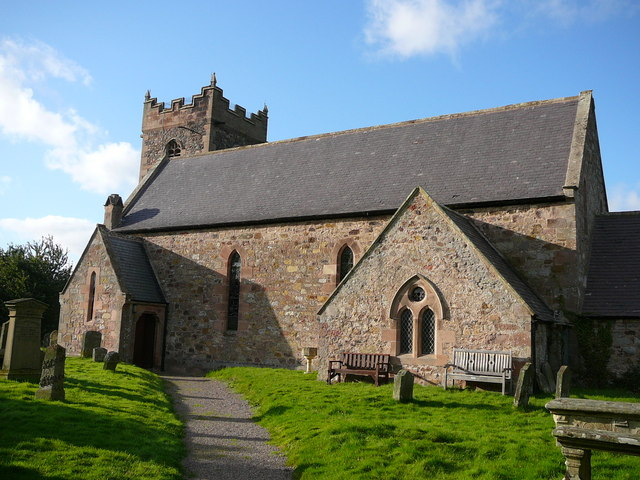
Kirknewton Parish Church

== Life ==
He was born in April 1785. In 1803 he was a student at the Selkirk Hall of the Secession Church under Professor Lawson.

He was licensed to preach by the Presbytery of Kirkcaldy in January 1810.

In October 1812 he was ordained as minister of Kirknewton under the patronage of George Earl of Morton. From 1828 he was made Joint Clerk of the General Assembly and in 1849 he succeeded Very Rev George Buist as Moderator of the General Assembly.

In 1836, the University of Edinburgh awarded him an honorary Doctor of Divinity. He became Principal Clerk to the General Assembly in 1859.

The elders of his church included Allan Maconochie, Lord Meadowbank.

He died in the manse in Kirknewton on 15 December 1861. When he died he was Principal Clerk to the General Assembly. He was unmarried and had no children.

He is buried in Dalry Cemetery in western Edinburgh.
