= Kirknewton House =

Mansion house and estate in West Lothian, Scotland

Coordinates: 55.8833°N 3.4157°W

- Former names: Meadowbank House

General information
- Architectural style: Scottish baronial
- Location: Kirknewton, West Lothian, Scotland
- Completed: c. 1690
- Renovated: c. 1835; 1870

Design and construction
- Architect: William Henry Playfair (remodelling)
- Designations: Category B listed building

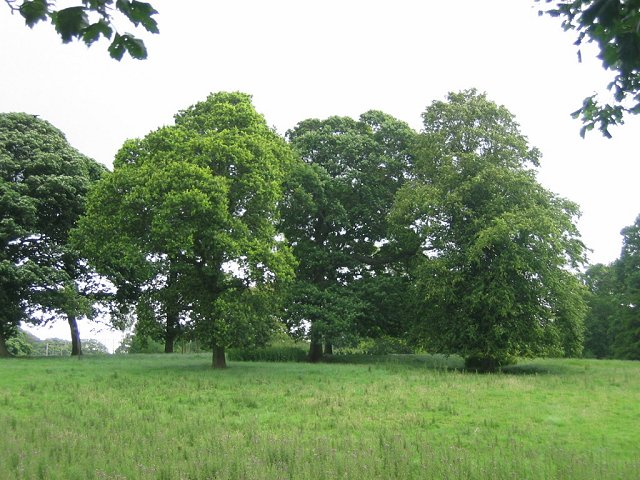
The estate grounds of the house

Kirknewton House, formerly known as Meadowbank House is a mansion house and estate on the edge of the village of Kirknewtown in West Lothian, Scotland. The house is Category B listed.

== History ==
Meadowbank house was built circa 1690 for the gentry family, the Maconochies of Meadowbank under James Maconochie of Meadowbank who was restored with funds and favour following the Glorious Revolution.

Allan Maconochie, Lord Meadowbank was a Scottish advocate who inherited the house from his father Alexander Maconochie. After Allan, 1st Lord Meadowbank died in 1816, the house passed to his son, Alexander Maconochie, Lord Meadowbank, the 2nd Lord Meadowbank. Around 1835, the 2nd Lord Meadowbank paid for the house to be heavily redesigned in the Scottish baronial style by the architect William Henry Playfair, a prominent 19th-century Scottish architect. An additional story was added in 1870. On his death in 1861, the house passed to Alexander's son, Allan Alexander Maconochie.

== Grounds ==
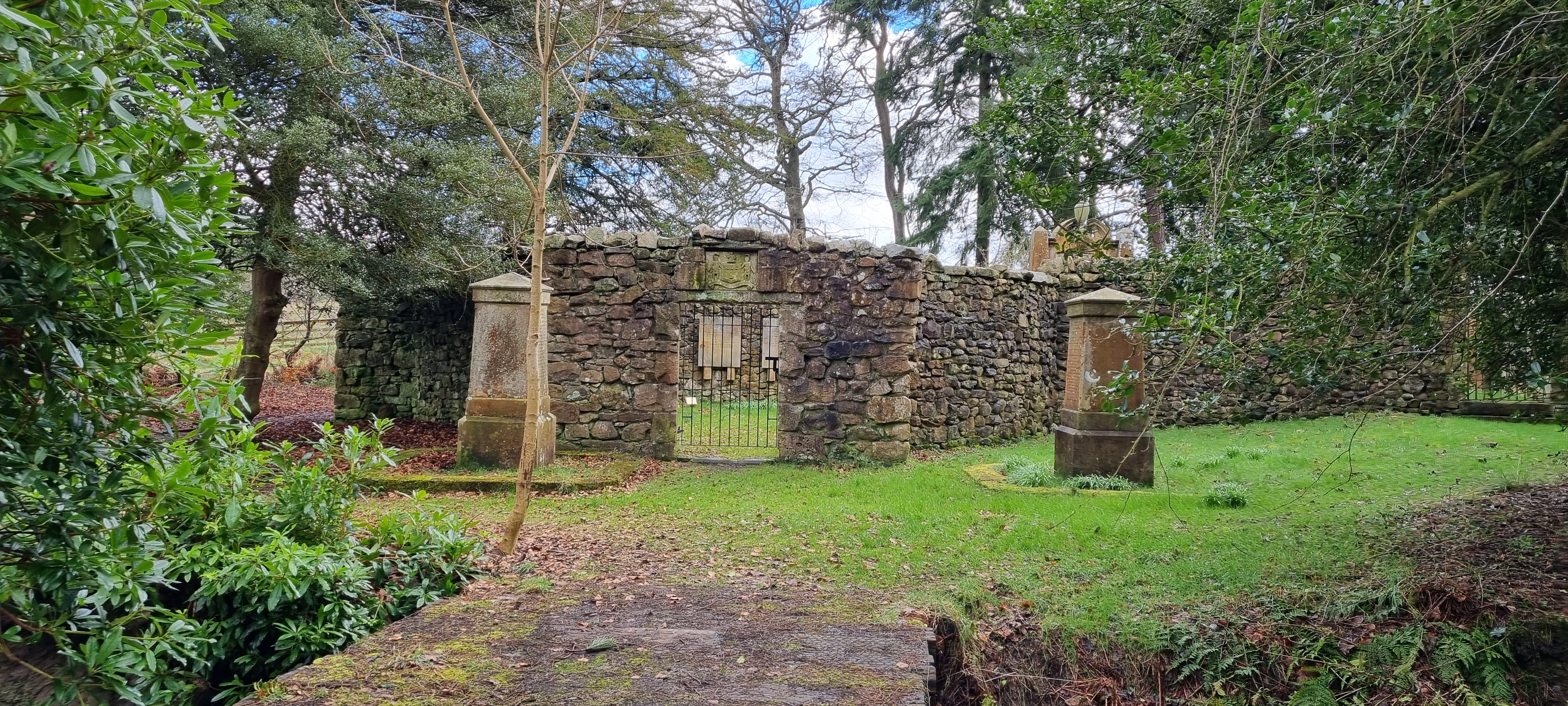
The Maconochie-Welwood private cemetery at Kirknewton House

There is a private cemetery and graveyard at the south-western edge of the estate that contains the graves of many former residents of the house, including the Lords Meadowbank.

The stables and estate builds are still extant and used as an events venue.

There is an inhabited crenelated gatehouse on the north side of the estate adjacent to Kirknewtown village. The gatehouse served for a time as a pub, the Huntingtower Inn.
