= Allan Maconochie, Lord Meadowbank =

Scottish advocate, jurist, and agriculturalist (1748–1816)

Lord Meadowbank
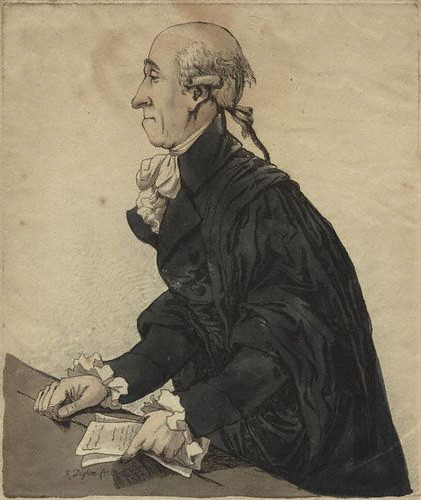
- Allan Maconochie, etching by Robert Dighton.
- Born: 26 January 1748
- Died: 14 June 1816 (aged 68); Edinburgh
- Education: University of Edinburgh
- Occupations: Advocate, judge

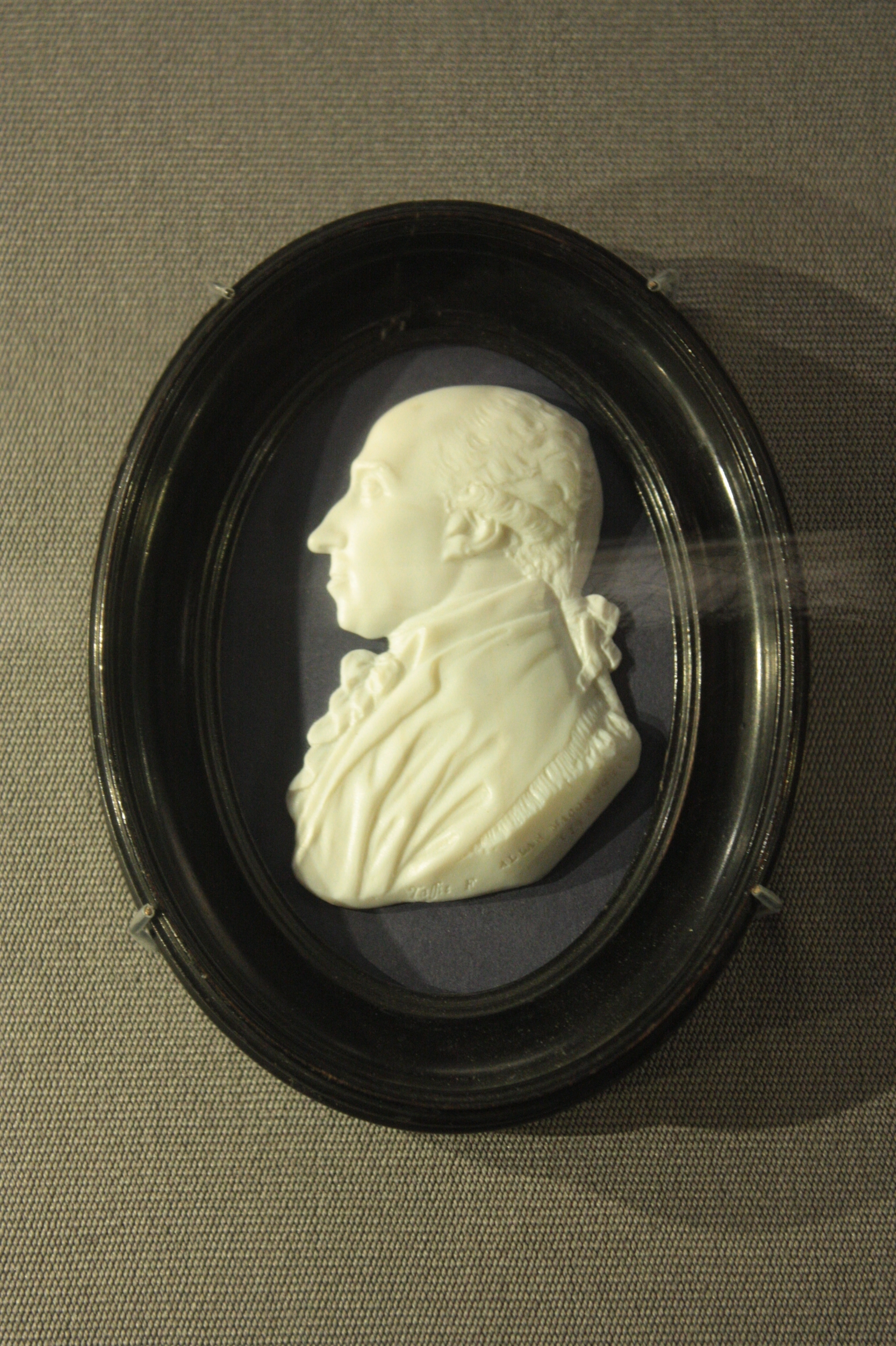
Cameo of Allan Maconochie, 1791, Scottish National Portrait Gallery

The Hon Allan Maconochie, Lord Meadowbank FRSE FSA (Scot) (1748–1816) was a Scottish advocate, academic jurist, judge and agriculturalist.

== Life ==
The only son of Alexander Maconochie of Meadowbank, Kirknewton, Midlothian, and his wife Isabella Allan, daughter of the Rev. Walter Allan, minister of Colinton in the same shire, was born on 26 January 1748. He was educated privately by Alexander Adam and at the High School of Edinburgh. He entered the University of Edinburgh, where he attended the law classes. He was apprenticed to Thomas Tod, writer to the signet.

In 1764, Maconochie, with William Creech, John Bruce, Henry Mackenzie, and two other fellow-students, founded the Speculative Society, devoted to public speaking and liberal thought. Having completed his university course in 1768, Maconochie went to Paris for a short time. He passed advocate on 8 December 1770 and was admitted as a student of Lincoln's Inn (16 April 1771), but was not called to the English bar. He subsequently returned to France, where he remained till 1773.

In 1774, he was elected to the general assembly as lay representative of the burgh of Dunfermline. Maconochie was appointed professor of public law and law of nature and nations in the University of Edinburgh on 16 July 1779; and on 18 December following was elected treasurer of the Faculty of Advocates.

In 1783 he was one of the co-founders of the Royal Society of Edinburgh. He served as the Society's Vice President 1812 to 1816.

In 1788 (until 1796) he became Sheriff-depute of Renfrewshire. He was one of the eight advocates who took an active part in procuring the rejection of Henry Erskine as dean of the faculty in January 1796. He was then living at 5 George Square, Edinburgh.

He succeeded Alexander Abercromby as an ordinary Lord of Session, and took his seat on the bench as Lord Meadowbank, on 11 March 1796. In the same year, he resigned his professorship. Maconochie was appointed a Lord of Justiciary in place of David Smythe of Methven on 4 September 1804, and was constituted one of the three lords commissioners of the newly appointed jury court on 9 May 1815. In a secret ruling in 1810 and 1812, on the case of Marianne Woods and Jane Pirie v Dame Helen Cumming Gordon he related lesbian sexuality as being as fantastical as witchcraft, and that it was 'notorious' that British Empire children's minds were lewdly influenced by Indian servants. His health, however, was poor, and he took little part in the proceedings of the new court, which was opened for the first time on 22 January 1816.

He died at Coates House in Dalry, Edinburgh on 14 June 1816, aged 68, and was buried in the private burial-ground of his house and estate, the Meadowbank estate, in the parish of Kirknewton, where there was a monument to his memory. Maconochie was considered an able judge, but eccentric. His predilection for Latin quotation was caricatured in the ‘Diamond Beetle Case,’ attributed to George Cranstoun, Lord Corehouse.

== Works ==
Maconochie was a keen agriculturist. He was the anonymous author of ‘Directions for Preparing Manure from Peat, and Instruction for Foresters,’ which was reprinted in 1815, Edinburgh, and again in 1842, Edinburgh. His ‘Considerations on the Introduction of Jury Trial in Civil Causes into Scotland’ was published anonymously in 1814, Edinburgh; 2nd edit. Edinburgh, 1815. His ‘Essay on the Origin and Structure of the European Legislatures’ appeared in two parts in the first volume (1788) of the Transactions of the Royal Society of Edinburgh, of which he was a vice-president.

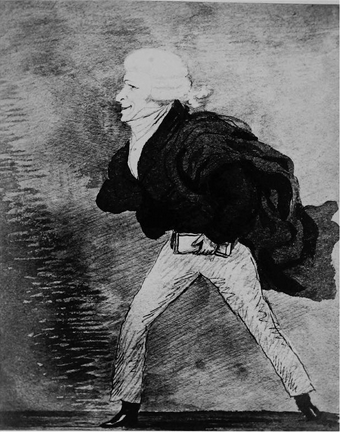
James Allan Maconochie by Robert Scott Moncrieff.

== Family ==
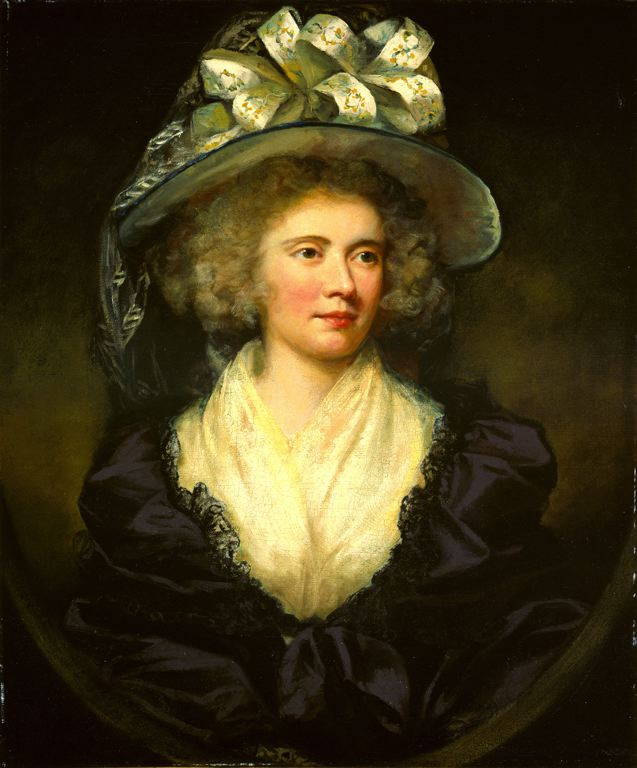
Elizabeth Maconochie, 1789 portrait by James Northcote.

He married, on 11 November 1774, Elizabeth, third daughter of Robert Welwood of Garvock and Pitliver, Fife, the granddaughter of Sir George Preston, bart., of Valleyfield. He left four sons:

- Alexander;
- Robert, who became mint master at Madras, and died in Devonshire Place, London, on 19 February 1858;
- James Allan, sheriff of Orkney and Shetland, who died unmarried in 1845; and
- Thomas Tod, who died unmarried in 1847.

Maconochie also raised his kinsman, the future penal reformer Alexander Maconochie (b1787) after Alexander's father died when he was aged nine.

He was grandfather to Prof Allan Alexander Maconochie FRSE (1806-1885).
