= Morton, West Lothian =

Locality in Midlothian, Scotland

Coordinates: 55°51′09″N 3°28′59″W

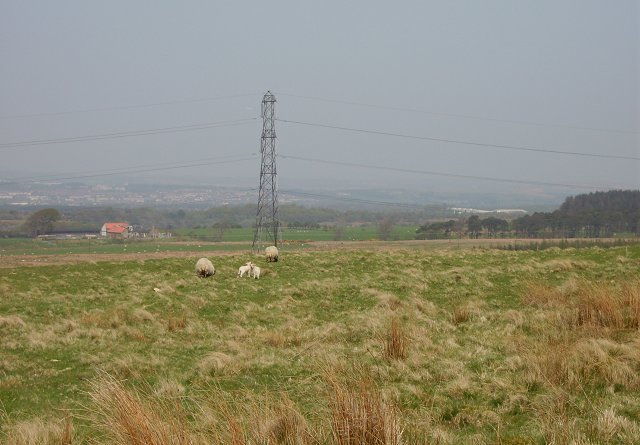
Morton Hill. Sheep on the better drained land of Morton Hill. Livingston in the distance.

Morton (Note: Previously spelt as Mortoun) is a locality in the parish of Kirknewton, in West Lothian, Scotland.

The locality has given its name to Morton Hill, Morton Burn and Upper and Lower Morton Reservoirs.

== History ==
There is a prehistoric and modern cairn in Morton situated on a grassy ridge of Corston Hill. The prehistoric cairn is a burial cairn of Late Neolithic or Bronze Age period. It is a scheduled monument of national importance.

Morton Hill is an area with extensive evidence of historical farming and shepherding, including rig and furrow cultivation.

The name of the area and ownership is historically that of the Earls of Morton.

== Economy ==
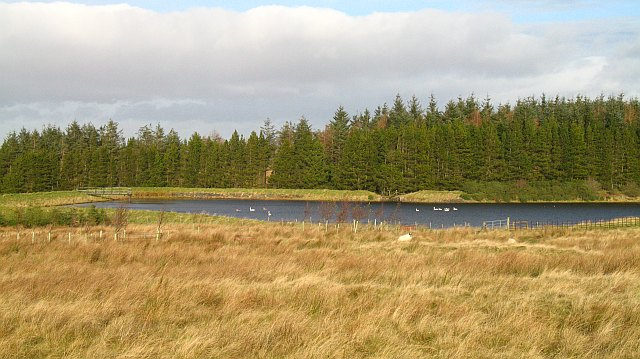
Upper Morton Reservoir

There is a trout Fishery in Morton. The fishery primarily uses Morton Reservoir, a large freshwater reservoir. There is also an Upper and Lower reservoir.

There is a shooting range and clay gun sports facility in Morton.
