= Alexander Maconochie, Lord Meadowbank =

Scottish advocate, judge, landowner and politician

The Right Honourable Lord Meadowbank FRSE, FSAS
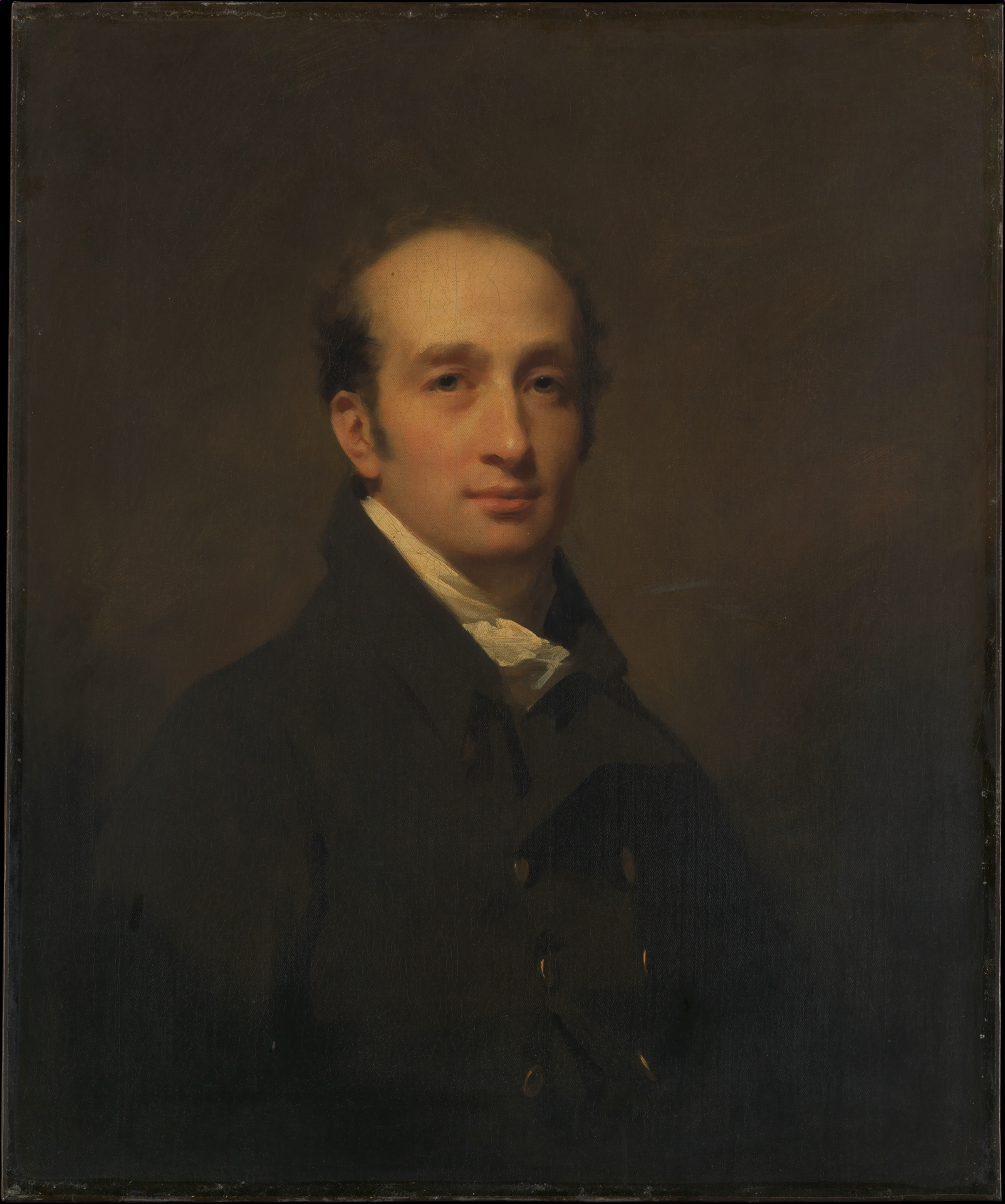
- Portrait of Lord Meadowbank by Sir Henry Raeburn

Lord of session and justiciary
- In office 24 June 1819 – 1843

Member of Parliament
- In office 1818–1819
- Preceded by: Sir John Anstruther
- Succeeded by: Sir William Rae, Bt.
- Constituency: Anstruther Burghs
- In office 1817–1818 Serving with John Leslie Foster
- Preceded by: Richard Wellesley; John Leslie Foster
- Succeeded by: John Copley; John Leslie Foster
- Constituency: Yarmouth

Lord Advocate
- In office 1816–1819
- Preceded by: Archibald Colquhoun
- Succeeded by: Sir William Rae, Bt.

Solicitor General for Scotland
- In office 1813–1816
- Preceded by: David Monypenny
- Succeeded by: James Wedderburn

Sheriff of Haddington
- In office 1810–1813
- Preceded by: John Burnett
- Succeeded by: William Home

Personal details
- Born: Alexander Maconochie; 2 March 1777 Midlothian, Scotland, Great Britain
- Died: 30 November 1861 (aged 84) Meadowbank House, Kirknewton, West Lothian, Scotland, United Kingdom
- Spouse: Anne Blair (m. 1805)
- Children: Allan Alexander Maconochie Welwood of Meadowbank and Garvock
- Parents: Allan Maconochie, Lord Meadowbank (father); Elizabeth Welwood (mother)
- Education: Royal High School; University of Edinburgh
- Occupation: Advocate, Judge, Politician

The Right Honourable Alexander Maconochie, Lord Meadowbank of Garvock and Pitliver FRSE, FSA Scot (2 March 1777 – 30 November 1861), was a Scottish advocate, judge, landowner and politician. After 1854 he took the surname Maconochie-Welwood.

== Life ==
Maconochie was born on 2 March 1777 in "Society" a district in south Edinburgh, Midlothian (now known as the Pleasance), the eldest son of Elizabeth Welwood of Garvock and Allan Maconochie, Lord Meadowbank. He was educated at the Royal High School, Edinburgh, and at the University of Edinburgh. He was admitted as an advocate in 1799, and in 1800 admitted to the Highland Society.

He served as Sheriff of Haddington from 1810 and Solicitor General for Scotland from 1813, and as Lord Advocate from 1816 to 1819.

He was Member of Parliament for Yarmouth, Isle of Wight, England, from 1817–1818, and for the Kilrenny district of Anstruther Burghs from 1818 to 1819. He made his Parliamentary debut during a period of considerable unrest in both Scotland and England in 1817, choosing to mark it by announcing the existence of a seditious conspiracy of weavers in the suburbs of Glasgow. The ensuing prosecutions were spectacularly unsuccessful, however, and caused considerable embarrassment, both to the government and to Maconochie himself, who, as Lord Advocate, was directly responsible.

In 1817 he was elected a Fellow of the Royal Society of Edinburgh. His proposers were Sir William Arbuthnot, 1st Baronet, Thomas Allan, Sir David Brewster and Sir Henry Jardine. He served as a Councillor of the Society during 1822-5 (Literary section) and 1835–7.

In February 1827 he co-founded the Edinburgh Theatrical Fund with Sir Walter Scott and served as its first President. This body provided funds for "the relief of decayed actors".

In the 1830s, his city address is listed as 13 Royal Circus Edinburgh's New Town. His rural estate Meadowbank from which he took the name of his title was located in West Lothian. Meadowbank House passed to him from his father and circa 1835, he paid for the Scottish architect William Henry Playfair to redesign the house in Scottish baronial style.

In part because of his rather indifferent record, especially after further embarrassment in the Court of Session in 1819, he was appointed a lord of session and justiciary as Lord Meadowbank 1819, and resigned in 1843. With the same title as his father, he was subject of one of Scots law's better puns. When he quizzed one advocate as to the difference between 'likewise and also', he received the reply that just as his father had been Lord Meadowbank, so was he, 'also but not likewise'.

He assumed the additional surname of Welwood on succeeding to his cousin's estates in 1854.

Maconochie-Welwood died on 30 November 1861 at Meadowbank House (now named Kirknewton House), Kirknewton, West Lothian, and was interred at a private burial ground at Meadowbank House.

== Artistic Patronage ==
He was patron to the Edinburgh artist William Crawford.

== Family ==
In 1805 he married Anne Blair the eldest daughter of Lord President Robert Blair, Lord Avontoun. The couple had children including:

- Allan Alexander Maconochie FRSE (1806–1885).
- Isabella Cornelia (b. 1807, d. 1888)
- Robert Blair Maconochie (b. 21 May 1814, died 4 October 1863) who married Charlotte Joanna
- Mary Anne Maconochie, who married Steuart Bayley Hare of Calderhall, father of Lt Col Hare.
- Henry Dundas Maconochie-Welwood, b. 1820, died 1852 in Calcutta while working for the East India Company
- Anne (b. 1822, d. 1882)
- Elizabeth (d. 1881).
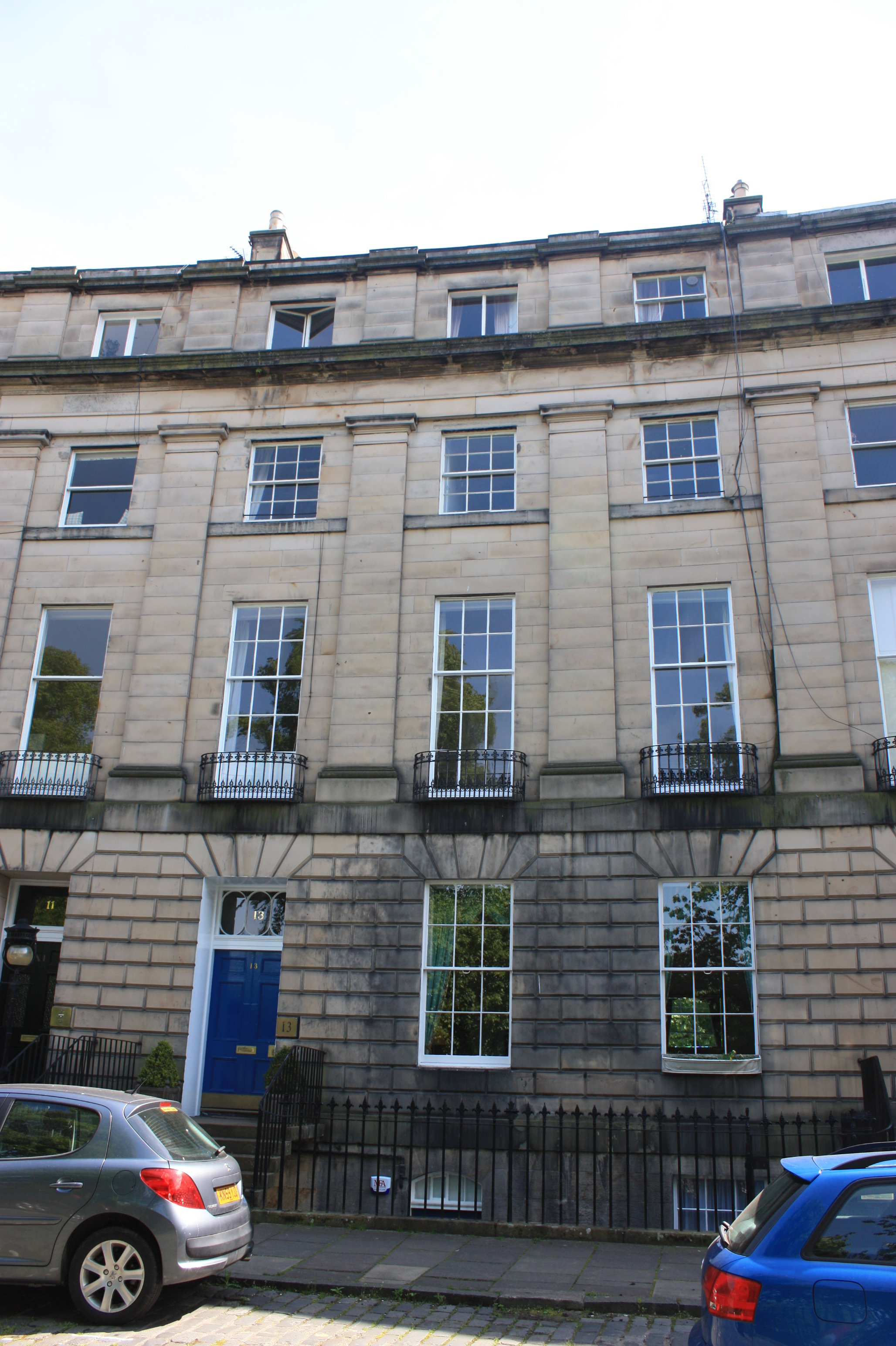
Lord Meadowbank's Edinburgh townhouse at 13 Royal Circus

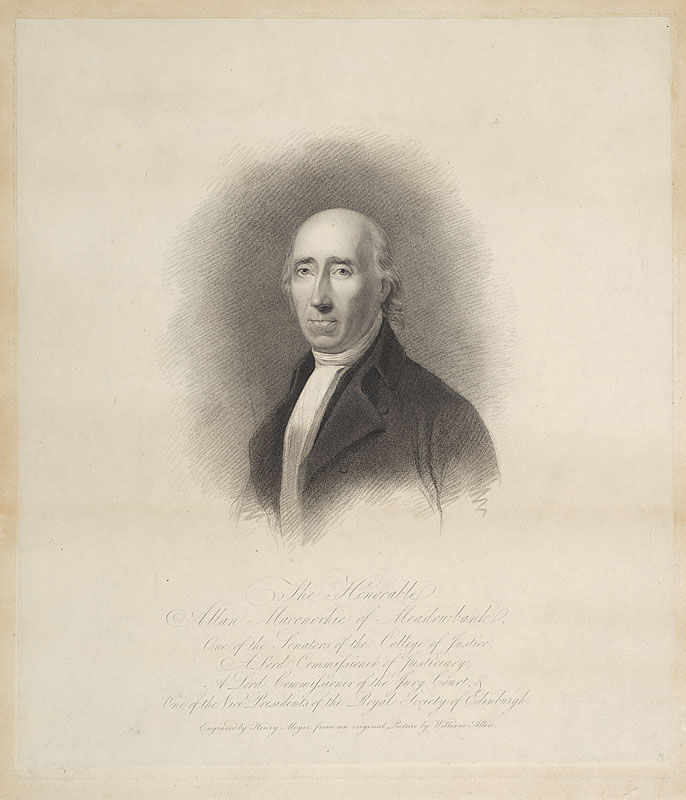
Lord Meadowbank, engraved by Henry Hoppner Meyer, after a painting by Allen William

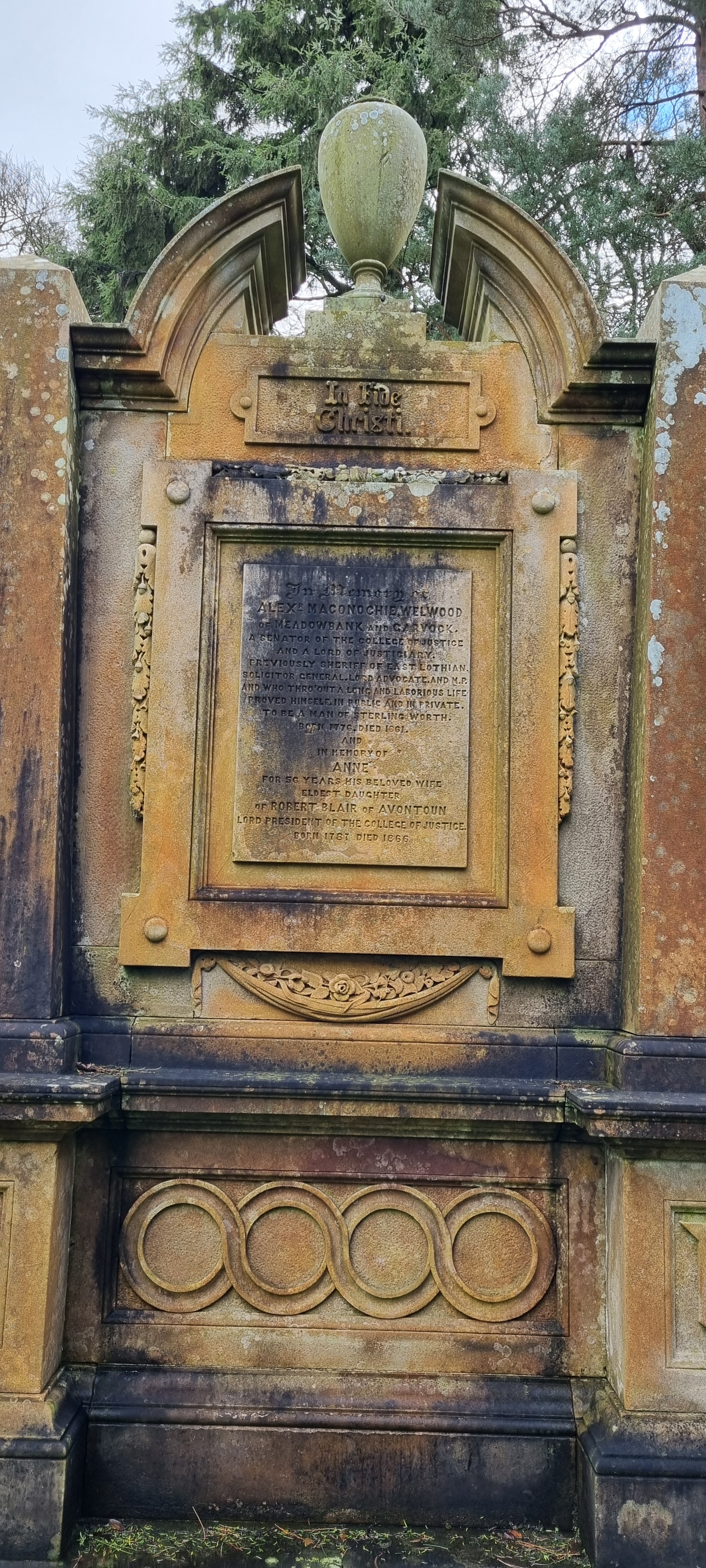
Grave of Alexander Machonichie Welwood, Kirknewton

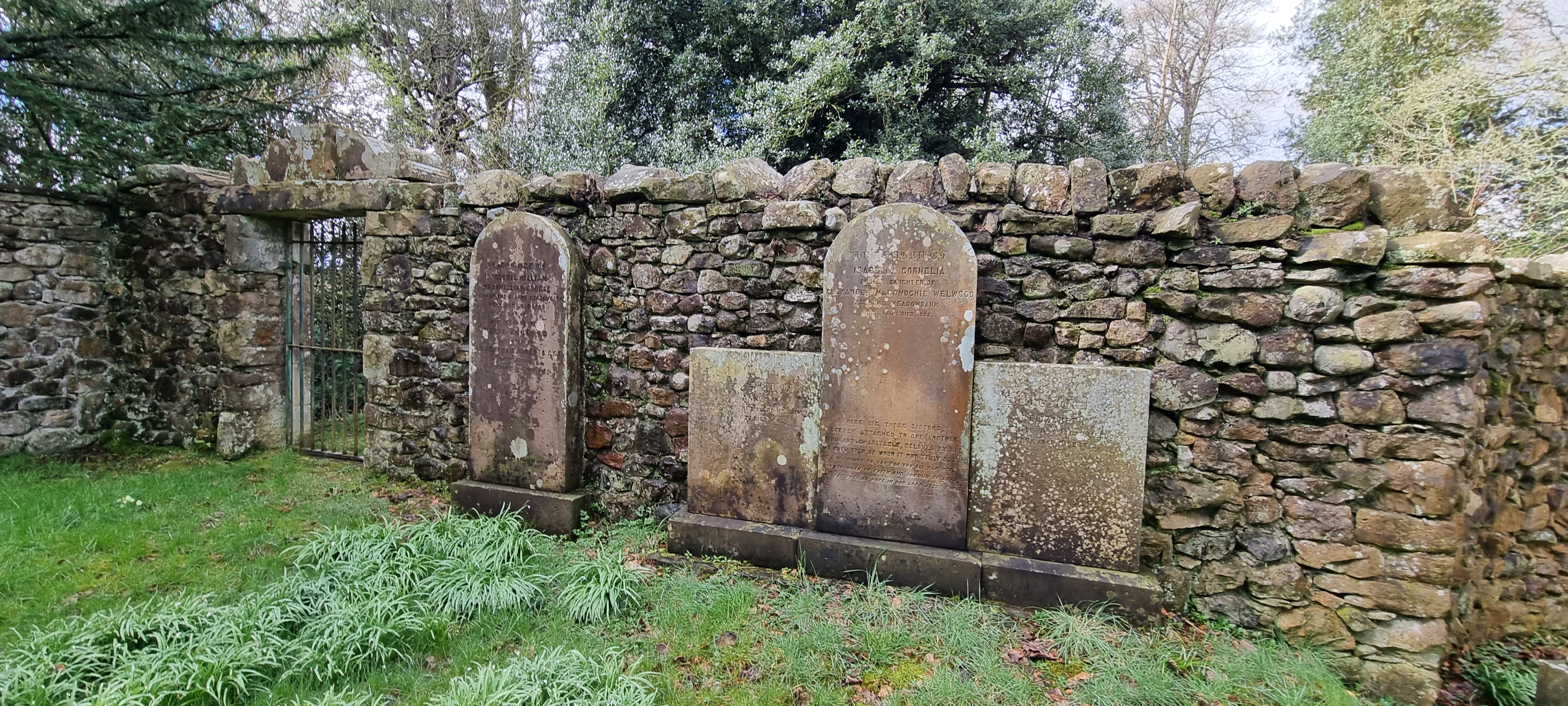
Grave of daughters Isabella, Anne and Elizabeth at Kirknewton House

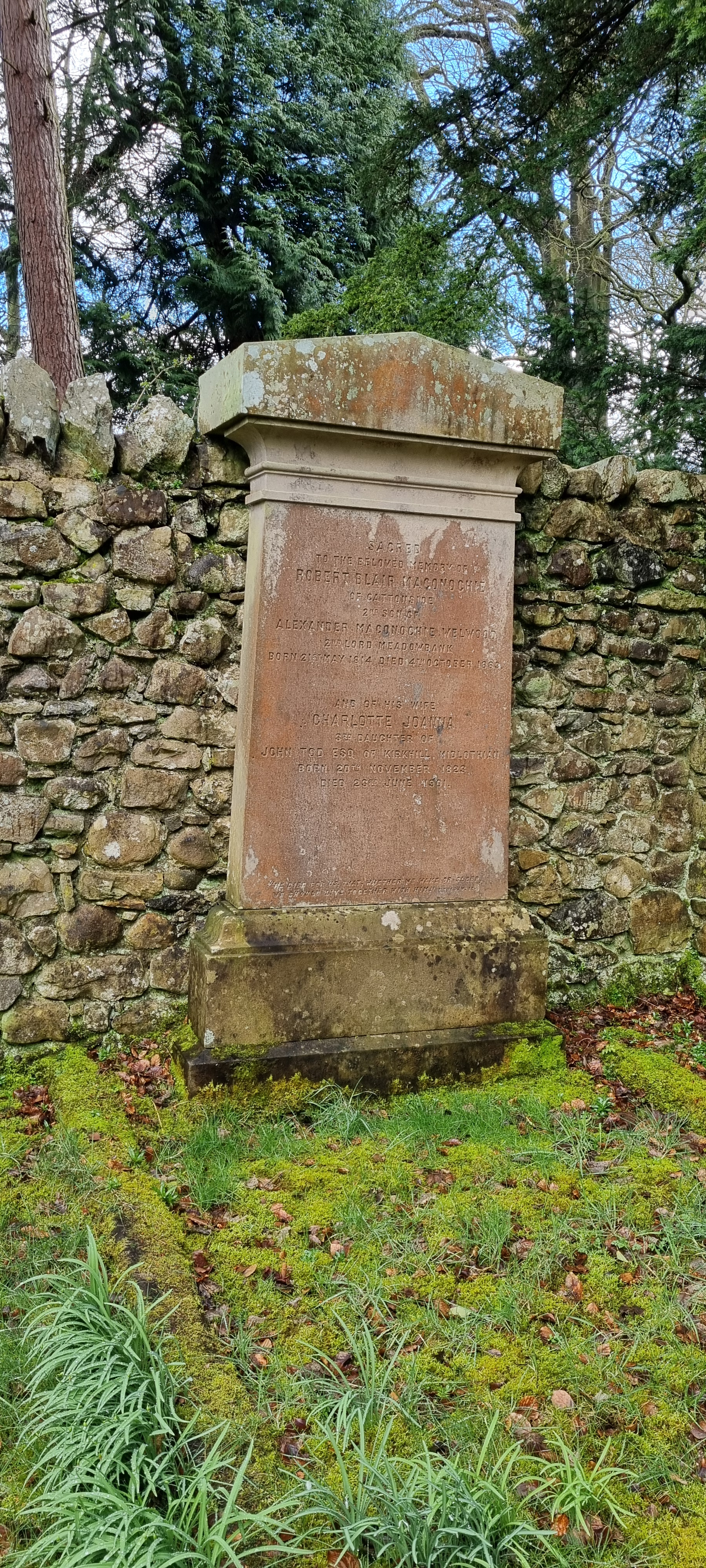
Grave of second son Robert Blair Maconochie

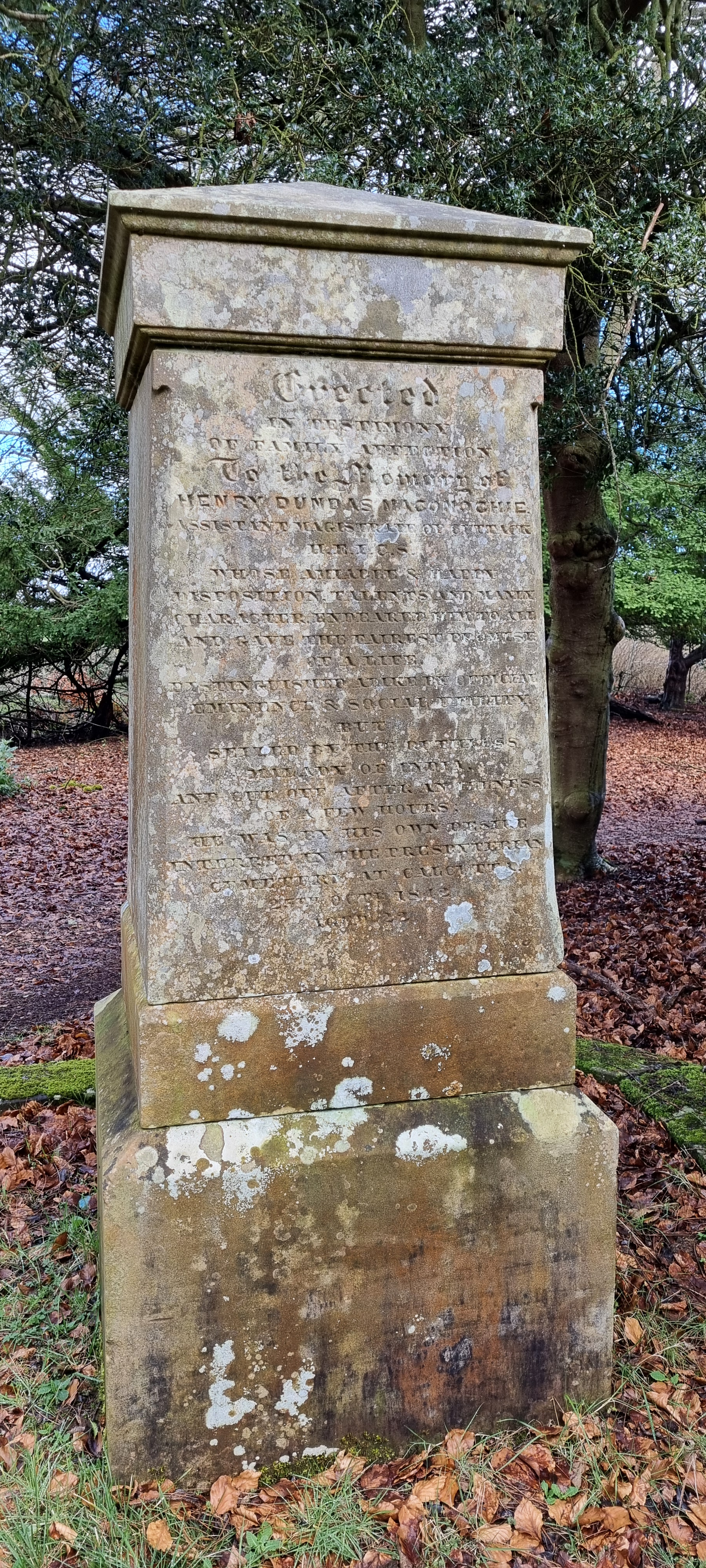
Grave of son Henry Dundas Maconochie, who died 1842 before his father

Parliament of the United Kingdom
Preceded by Richard Wellesley; John Leslie Foster	Member of Parliament for Yarmouth; 1817–1818; With: John Leslie Foster	Succeeded by John Copley; John Leslie Foster
Preceded by Sir John Anstruther	Member of Parliament for Anstruther Burghs; 1818–1819	Succeeded by Sir William Rae, Bt.
Legal offices
Preceded by David Monypenny	Solicitor General for Scotland; 1813–1816	Succeeded by James Wedderburn
Preceded by Archibald Colquhoun	Lord Advocate; 1816–1819	Succeeded by Sir William Rae, Bt.
