= Allan Alexander Maconochie =

Scottish advocate and amateur botanist

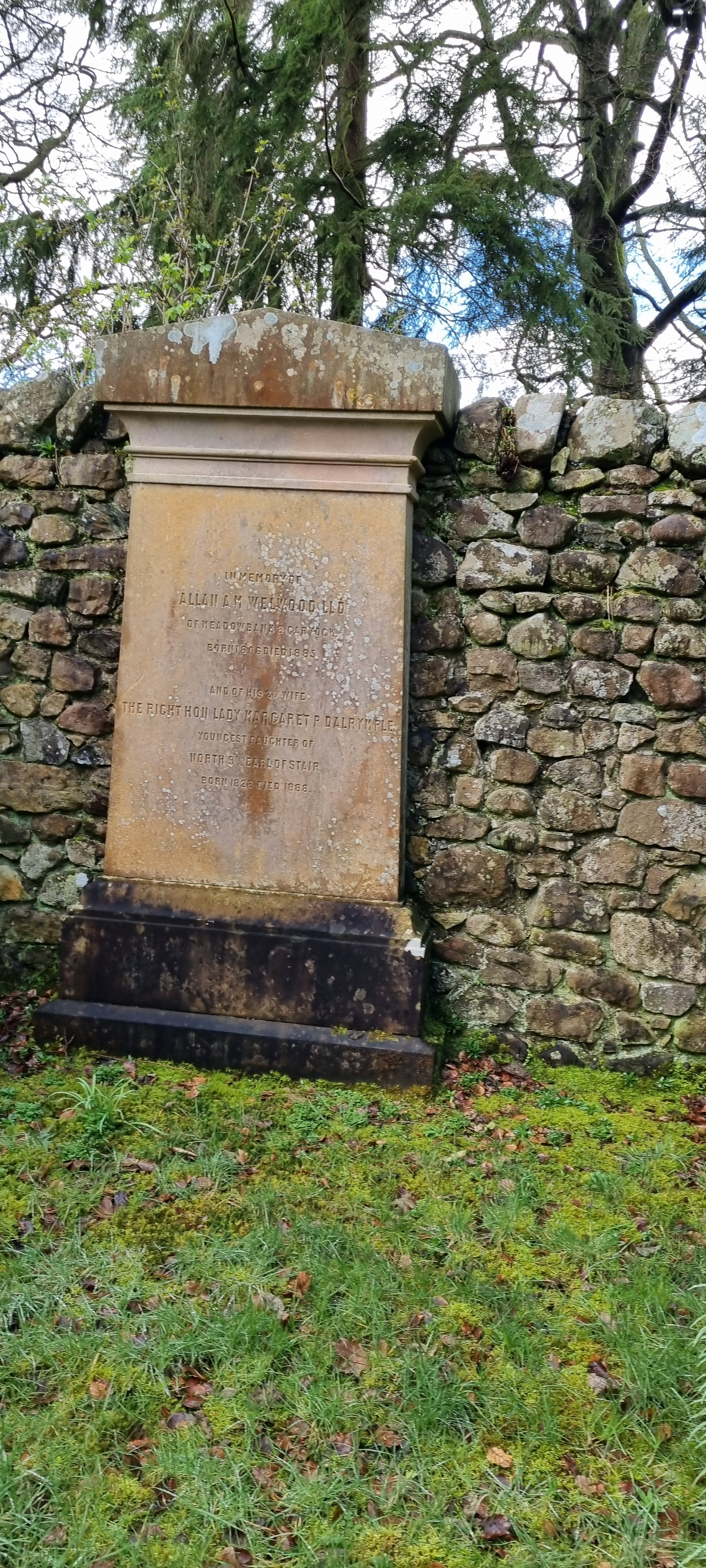
Grave of Allan and his 2nd wife Margaret in the family cemetery of Kirnewton House

Allan Alexander Maconochie of Meadowbank and Garvock FRSE (1806–1885) was a Scottish advocate and amateur botanist. He was Professor of Civil Law at Glasgow University. In legal documents he is referred to as A. A. Maconochie.

== Life ==
He was born in 1806 the eldest son of Alexander Maconochie, Lord Meadowbank and Anne Blair (daughter of the law lord Robert Blair, Lord Avontoun). He qualified as an advocate in 1829.

In 1840 he was elected a Fellow of the Royal Society of Edinburgh his proposer being Thomas Charles Hope. From 1843 to 1855 he was Professor of Civil Law at Glasgow University In 1855 he received an honorary doctorate (LLD) from Glasgow University.

In later life he adopted the name Maconochie-Welwood.

He died on 29 May 1885. His grave and that of his two wives is in the private cemetery of Kirknewton House.

== Family ==
He married twice. Firstly on 5 January 1836 to Ellen Wiggin (born in Boston, US on 17 May 1815, died 10 August 1849) Secondly in 1859 to Lady Margaret Dalrymple (formerly Penny, a widow and daughter of North Dalrymple, 9th Earl of Stair).
