= Kirknewton, West Lothian =

Village in West Lothian, Scotland

Coordinates: 55.888°N 3.420°W

Kirknewton: Scottish Gaelic: Eaglais a' Bhaile Ùir; Scots: Kirknewtoun
- View of Main Street, Kirknewton, West Lothian

- Location within West Lothian
- Population: 1,930 (2020)
- OS grid reference: NT112669
- Civil parish: Kirknewton
- Council area: West Lothian
- Lieutenancy area: West Lothian
- Country: Scotland
- Sovereign state: United Kingdom
- Post town: Kirknewton
- Postcode district: EH27
- Dialling code: 01506
- Police: Scotland
- Fire: Scottish
- Ambulance: Scottish
- UK Parliament: Livingston
- Scottish Parliament: Almond Valley

Kirknewton (Scots: Kirknewtoun, Scottish Gaelic: Eaglais a' Bhaile Ùir) is a village formerly in the county of Midlothian and, since 1975, in West Lothian, Scotland. The population of the Kirknewton Community Council district is 2200, which includes the village and surrounding areas. It lies south of the A71 from Edinburgh to Livingston, and north of the A70, the high-level road that runs along the north side of the Pentland Hills from Edinburgh to Carnwath and Lanark. Much of the village stands back from the B7031, which links the two main "A" roads. To the south-east of the village is Morton.

== History ==
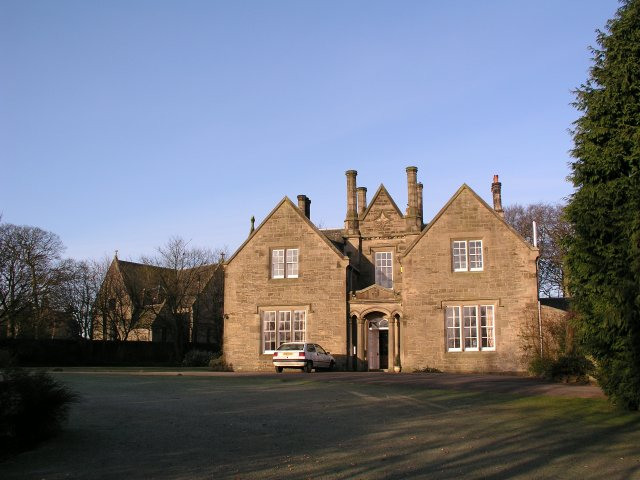
Manse and Kirk at Kirknewton

The earliest signs of settlement in the area are the remains of Iron Age forts on Kaimes Hill and Dalmahoy Hill, craggy summits about a mile east of Kirknewton. In slightly more recent times, Kirknewton House, which lies just to the south of the village, had its origins (as Meadowbank House) in the 17th century. The current house is a reworking of the original by the architect William Playfair for Alexander Maconochie, Lord Meadowbank in 1835. Kirknewton House is screened by trees from nearby roads and from the village itself. The most obvious evidence of its existence is the entrance lodge beside the start of the drive to the house at the south end of the village.

Ormiston House is a Scottish baronial mansion south of Kirknewton. It was built in 1851 for Archibald Wilkie, to a design by David Bryce.

Kirknewton stood at the south eastern corner of the large area of West Lothian which was transformed from the 1860s by the oil shale industry, with the nearest shale mine lying just to the north west of the village, between it and East Calder. Shale from here was taken to the huge oil shale works at Pumpherston for processing.

During World War II, the Royal Air Force built a military airfield at Whitemoss, a mile south east of Kirknewton. RAF Kirknewton, as it was known, was home to a variety of units during the war and, like many other military airfields, fell quiet afterwards. In 1952 it became home to a number of small United States Air Force units tasked with providing mobile radio facilities to the USAF in Britain. The USAF left in 1966, and today Kirknewton airfield is home to a RAF(V) Gliding Unit, 661 (RAF Kirknewton) VGS.

== Education ==
Kirknewton Primary School was built in 1924 and comprises a nursery and 7 primary classes. The school is located in the west of the village on Station Road.

== The village ==
Kirknewton's Main Street has a very enclosed feel. Stretching from the junction with the B7031 to the old kirkyard in the centre of the village, it consists of a collection of one and two storey buildings.

At the west end of the village is Kirknewton railway station, officially known as Midcalder Railway Station until 1982. Where the B7031 crosses the railway line at the west end of the station is a level crossing.

One accident involving a motor vehicle led to a death and another involving a pedestrian had tragic consequences but the victim did survive. In 2013 the 35-year-old crossing was replaced with double-double barriers. Together with a LIDAR system to ensure trains could not proceed with anything on the crossing, this removed the possibility of previous accidents. While delays to traffic occur, this new system was planned to be substituted for a pedestrian and road-tunnel design which would have cost up to £18 million, critically damaged local farm land and required significant dynamite blasting close to a number of homes along the road to the West of the crossing. As of 2020 there is still a level crossing in place, with no plans to construct a tunnel.

The village is served by Lothian Country's bus route X28 connecting Bathgate via Livingston and Regent Road, Edinburgh.

== Kirknewton Parish Church ==
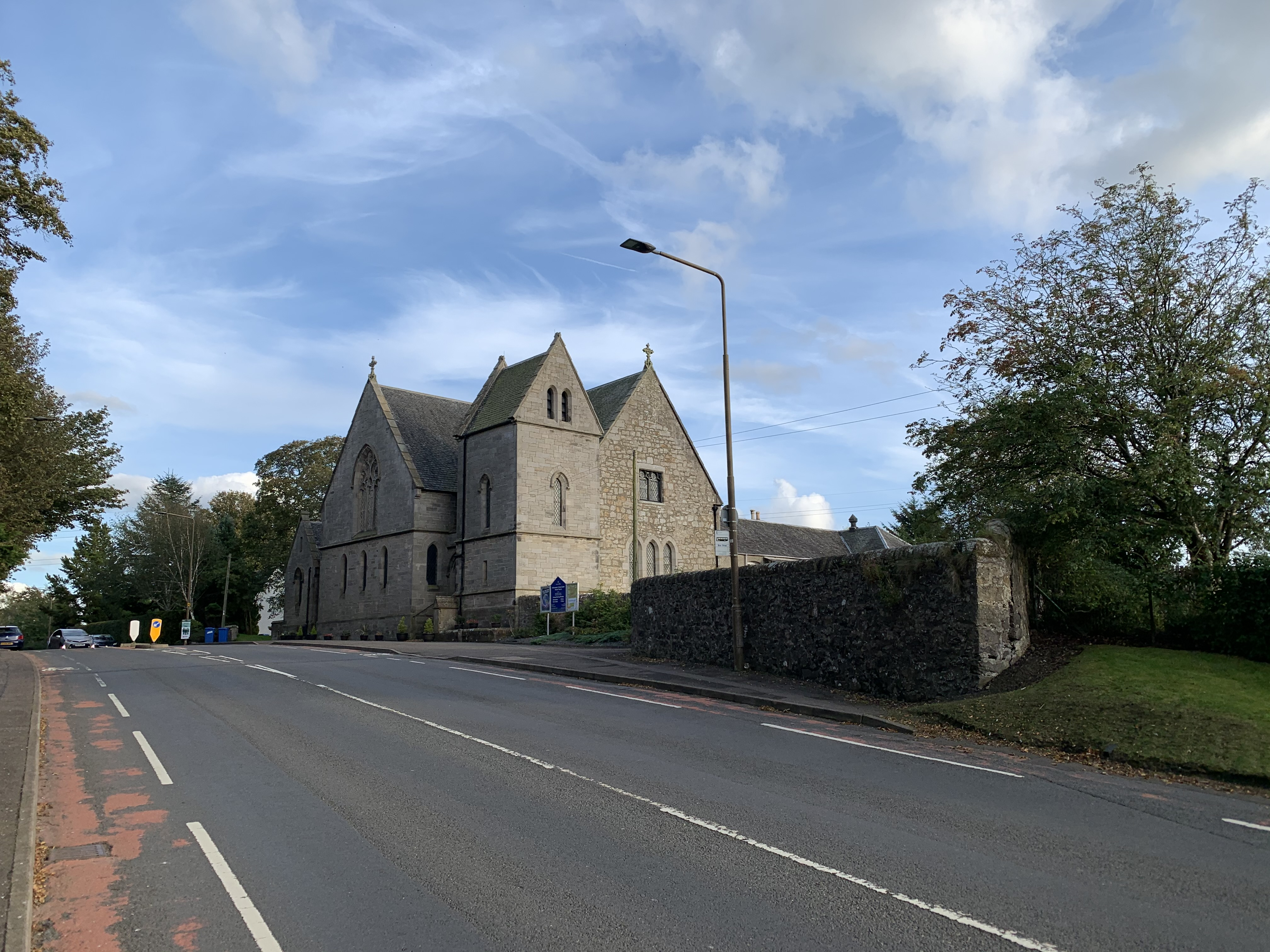
Kirknewton Parish Church

A parish church existed in 1571 under the control of the Presbytery of Edinburgh and was annexed to Linlithgow in 1591.

The current parish church dates from 1751 when the parish was afforded a degree of autonomy. It was remodelled in the Gothic style in 1872 by Brown & Wardrop. The manse retains its 1750 architecture.

The kirkyard, which is separate from the church, is home to a number of headstones dating back to the 18th century, and a burial enclosure for the Campbell Maconachies of Meadowbank House that dates back to 1662.

The other burial enclosure was constructed by the Royal Society of Physicians as a memorial for an important founding member, William Cullen (d.1790). Professor Cullen was a significant figure in 18th century medicine, chemistry, agriculture and practised the application of science to agriculture at a nearby farm.

=== Notable Ministers ===
- Rev Alexander Bryce polymath
- Very Rev Alexander Lockhart Simpson Moderator in 1849
