= William Henry Playfair =

Scottish architect (1790-1857)

William Henry Playfair FRSE
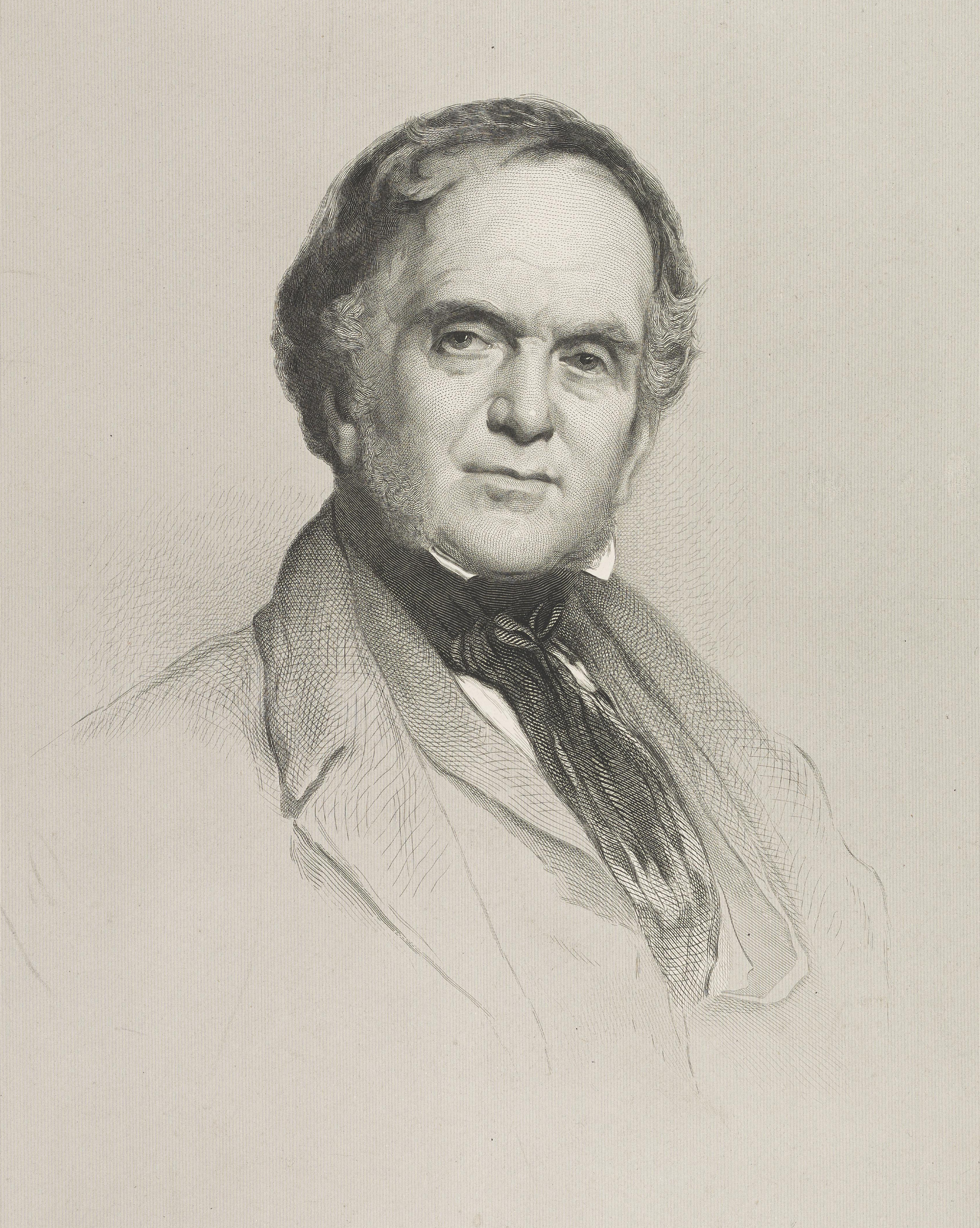
- Born: 15 May 1790; London, England
- Died: 19 March 1857 (aged 66); Edinburgh, Scotland
- Education: University of Edinburgh
- Occupation: Architect
- Parent: James Playfair
- Buildings: National Gallery of Scotland; Old College, University of Edinburgh; Royal College of Surgeons of Edinburgh; Royal Scottish Academy Building; Dollar Academy

Signature
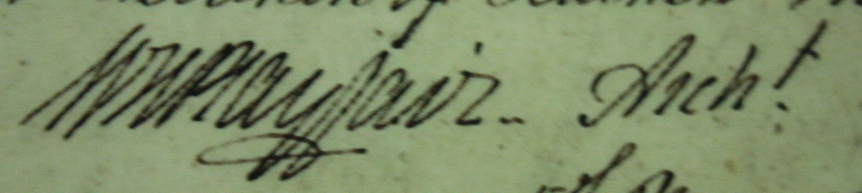

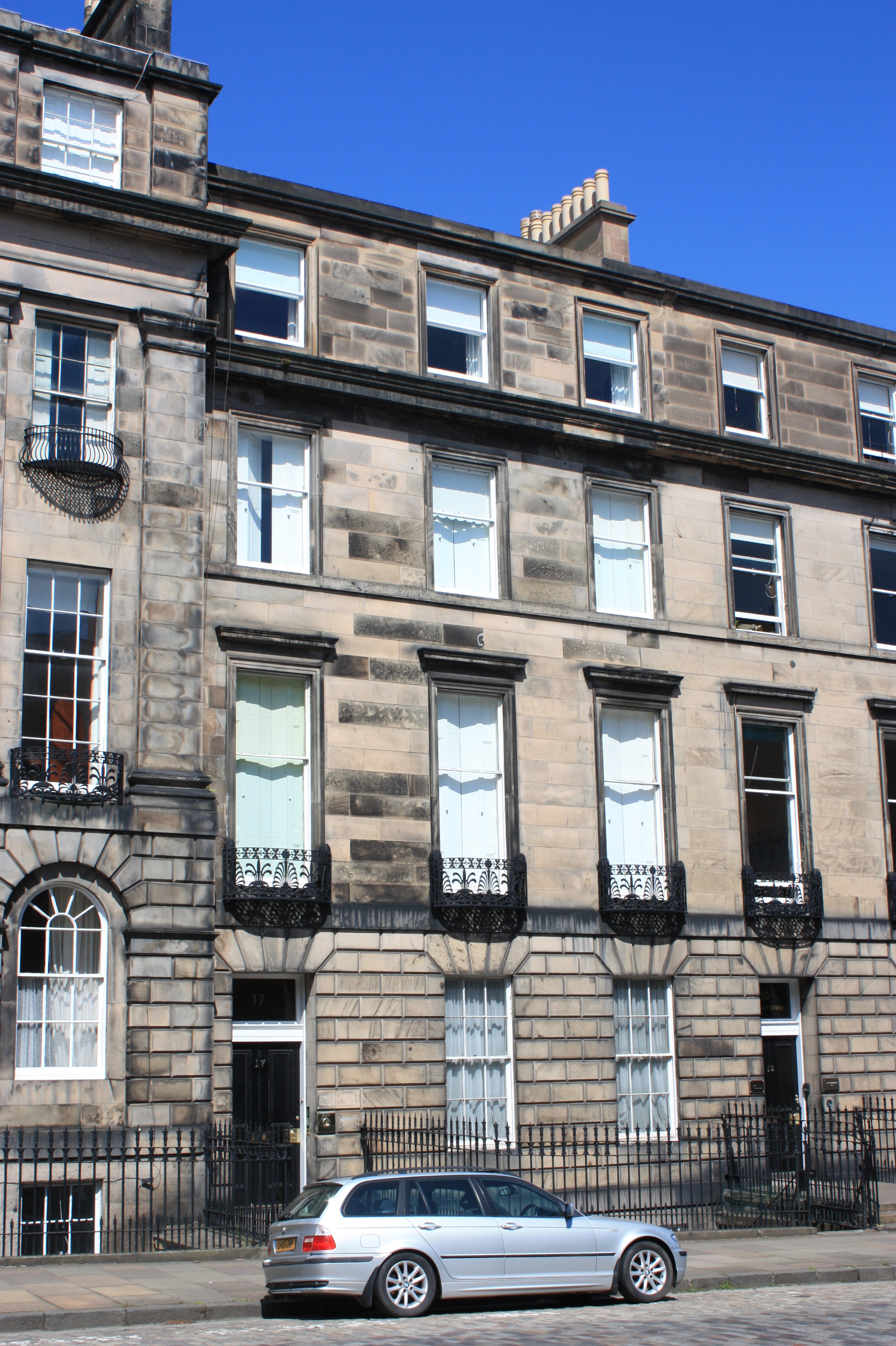
Playfair's townhouse at 17 Great Stuart Street, Edinburgh

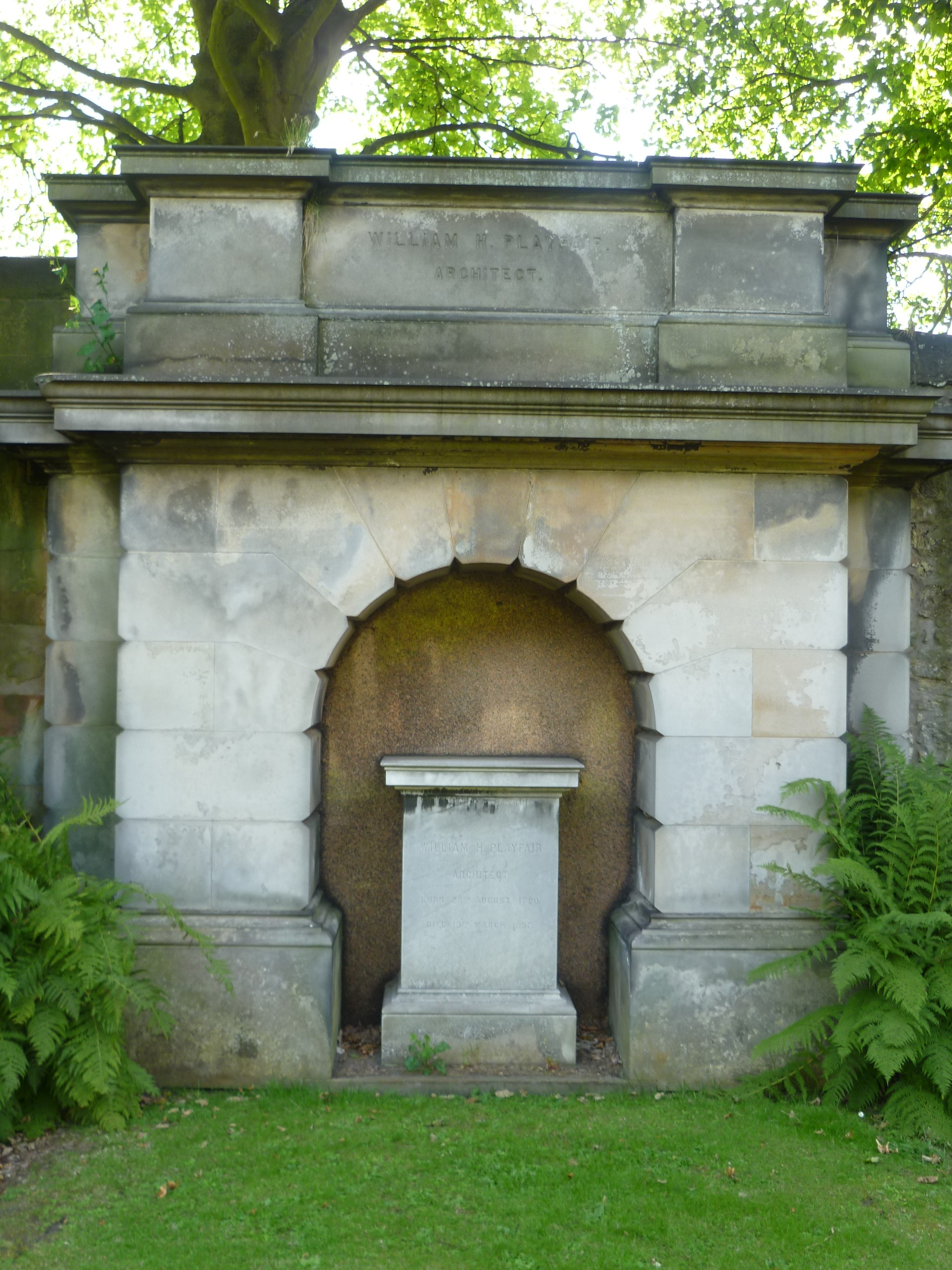
Playfair's grave in Dean Cemetery, Edinburgh

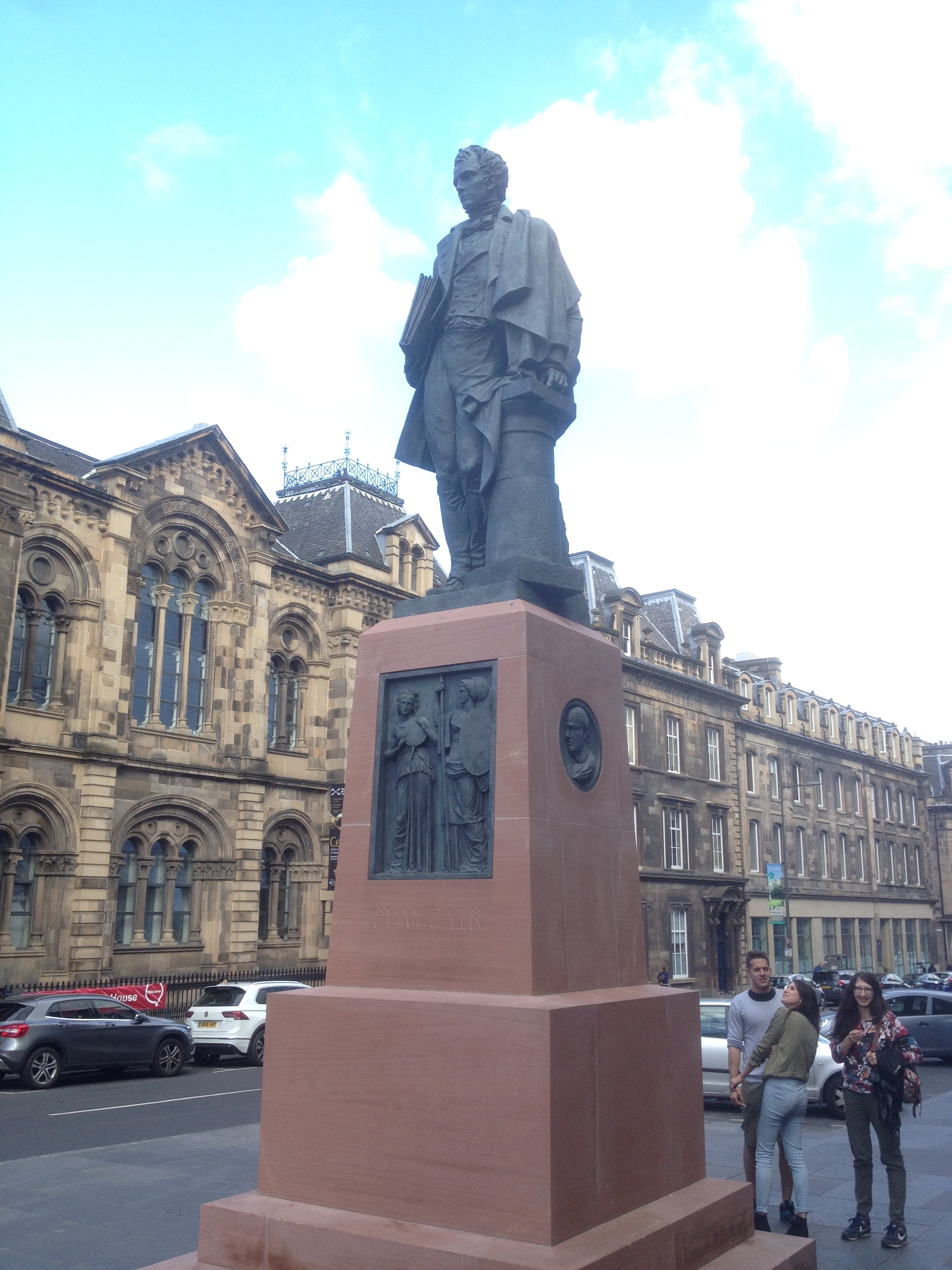
Statue of William Henry Playfair, Chambers Street, Edinburgh

William Henry Playfair FRSE (15 July 1790 – 19 March 1857) was a Scottish architect in the 19th century who designed the Eastern, or Third, New Town and many of Edinburgh's neoclassical landmarks.

== Life ==
Playfair was born on 15 July 1790 in Russell Square, London to Jessie Graham and James Playfair. His father was also an architect, and his uncles were the mathematician John Playfair and William Playfair, an economist and pioneer of statistical graphics. After his father's death he was sent to Edinburgh to be educated by his uncle John Playfair. He went on to study at the University of Edinburgh, graduating in 1809. He was first articled to the architect William Stark and when Stark died in 1813, he went to London.

In the 1830s Playfair is listed as living at 17 Great Stuart Street on the prestigious Moray Estate in Edinburgh's West End. This is not a building of his own design, but is by his rival James Gillespie Graham.

Playfair joined the Free Church following the Disruption of 1843, losing his right to burial in the parish churchyard.

Playfair took David Cousin under his wing and was responsible for the latter part of his training.

== Freemasonry ==
Playfair was Initiated into Scottish Freemasonry in Lodge St David, No.36, (Edinburgh, Scotland) on 18 January 1815.

== Death ==
Playfair died in Edinburgh on 19 March 1857, and is buried in the "Lord's Row" on the western wall of Edinburgh's Dean Cemetery, where he designed monuments for others, including Lord Jeffrey.

== Major works ==
Two of his finest works are the neoclassical buildings of the National Gallery of Scotland and the Royal Scottish Academy which are in the centre of Edinburgh. The Playfair Project, completed in 2004, joined the two historic buildings with an underground link. Many of his architectural drawings are held by the University of Edinburgh Heritage Collections.

== Timeline of major projects ==
- 1817 Appointed architect to complete design work on the Old College, University of Edinburgh, on the basis of his proposals to complete the plans originated by Robert Adam. The building was completed around 1831.
- 1818 Commissioned to design Dollar Academy: the original building which he created is now known as the Playfair Building
- 1818 City Observatory, Calton Hill
- 1820 East New Town (Calton Hill), Edinburgh (including Regent, Carlton and Royal Terraces), built between 1821 and 1860
- 1821–24 Royal Terrace, East New Town, Edinburgh only completed in 1860
- 1822 Commissioned by the Institution for the Encouragement of Fine Arts in Scotland. The building was opened in 1826 and is now the Royal Scottish Academy Building, Edinburgh
- 1823 Royal Circus, New Town, Edinburgh
- 1824 in collaboration with Charles Robert Cockerell, designed an exact replica of the Parthenon which was to be built on top of Calton Hill as the National Monument, Edinburgh. Due to lack of investment it was never finished.
- 1825 Regent and Carlton Terraces, East New Town, Edinburgh, completed in the 1830s
- 1826 John Playfair Monument, (he was William Henry's uncle), Calton Hill, Edinburgh
- 1827 – 1828 St Stephen's Church, St Stephen's Place, Silvermills, Edinburgh
- 1829 Drumbanagher House, Armagh (demolished); London Road Gardens, Edinburgh
- 1830 – 1832 For the Royal College of Surgeons of Edinburgh, Surgeons' Hall, Nicolson Street, Edinburgh
- 1831 Dugald Stewart Monument, Calton Hill, Edinburgh
- 1833 Brownlow House, Lurgan, Northern Ireland
- 1835 Kirknewton House, West Lothian
- circa 1837 renovations to Floors Castle, outskirts of Kelso, Scottish Borders
- 1846 – 1850 New College, Edinburgh
- 30 August 1850 Prince Albert laid the foundation stone of the National Gallery of Scotland, adjacent to The Royal Scottish Academy.
- 1851 Donaldson's College, Edinburgh
- 1859 National Gallery of Scotland opened to the public two years after Playfair's death.

== Gallery of architectural work ==
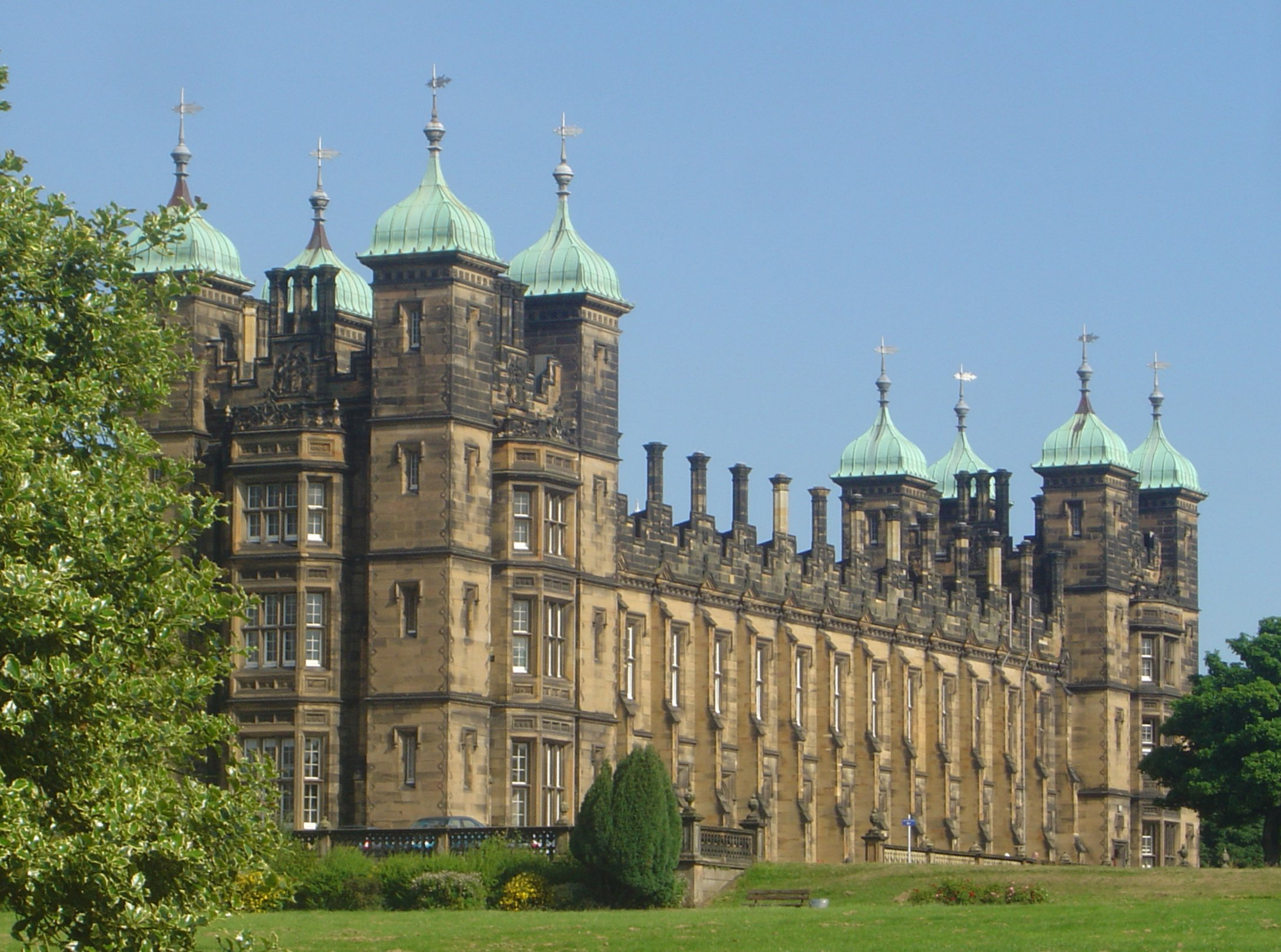
Donaldson's College, Edinburgh 1851

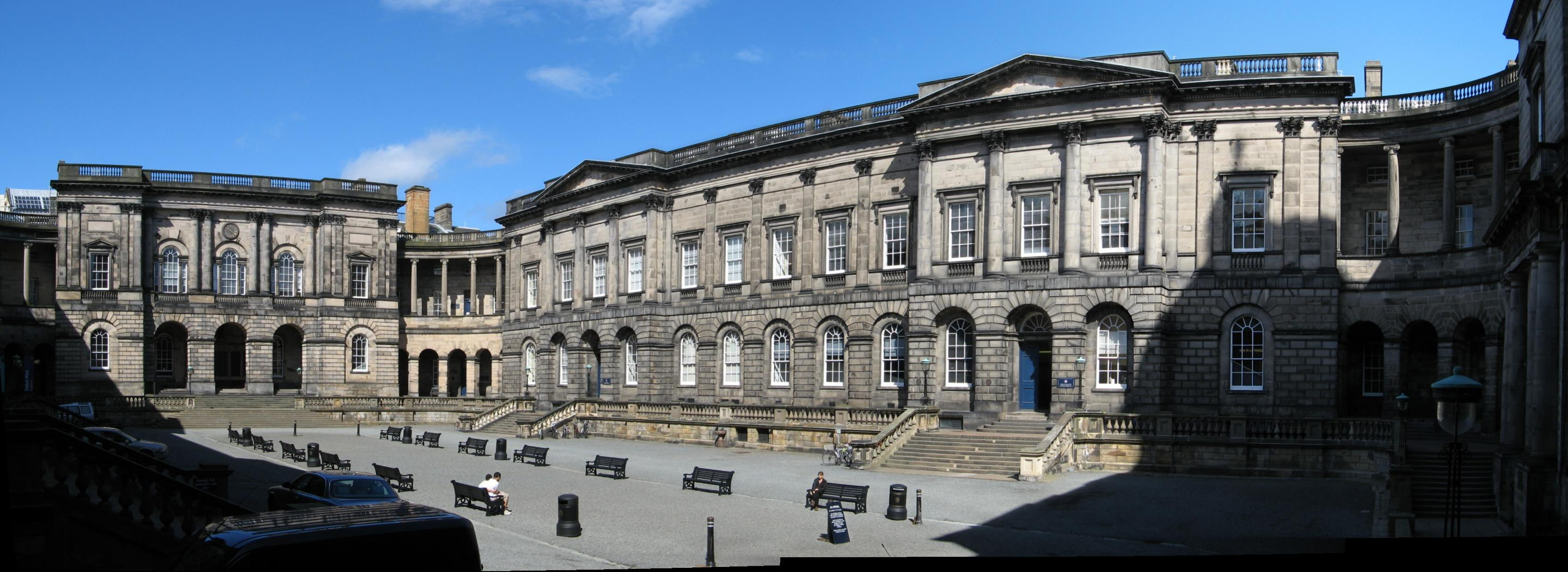
Old College, Edinburgh University

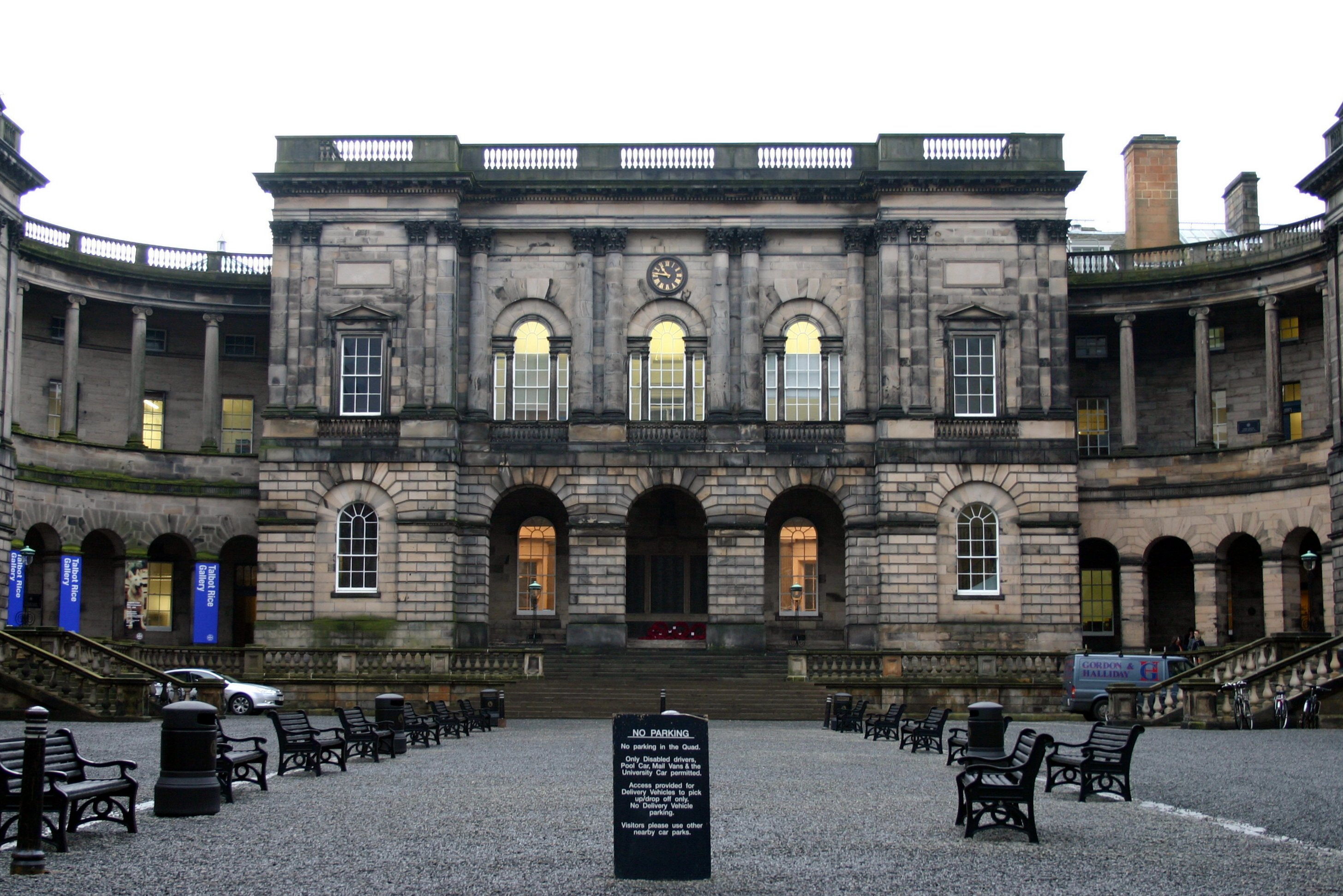
Old College, Edinburgh University

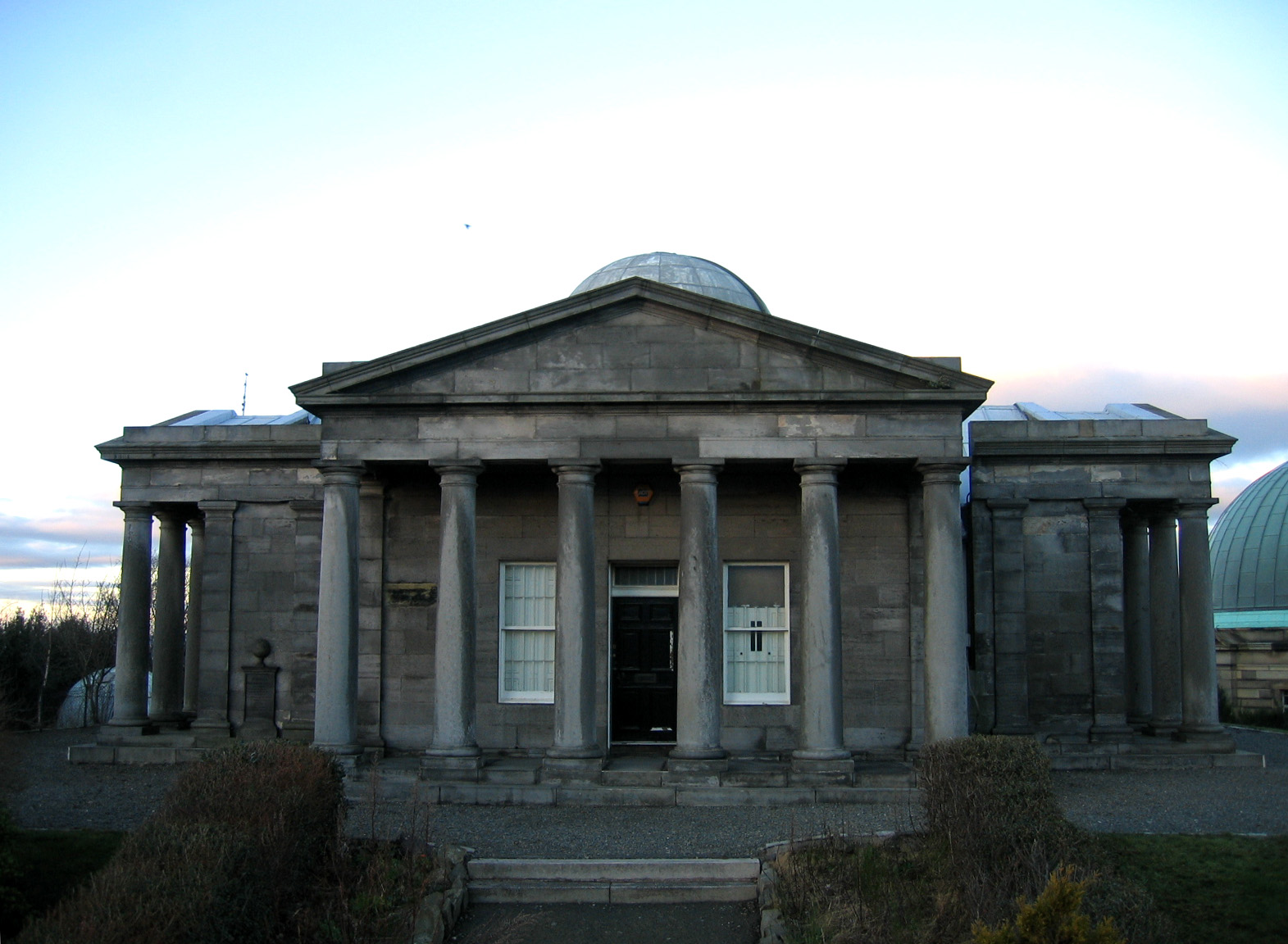
City Observatory, Edinburgh

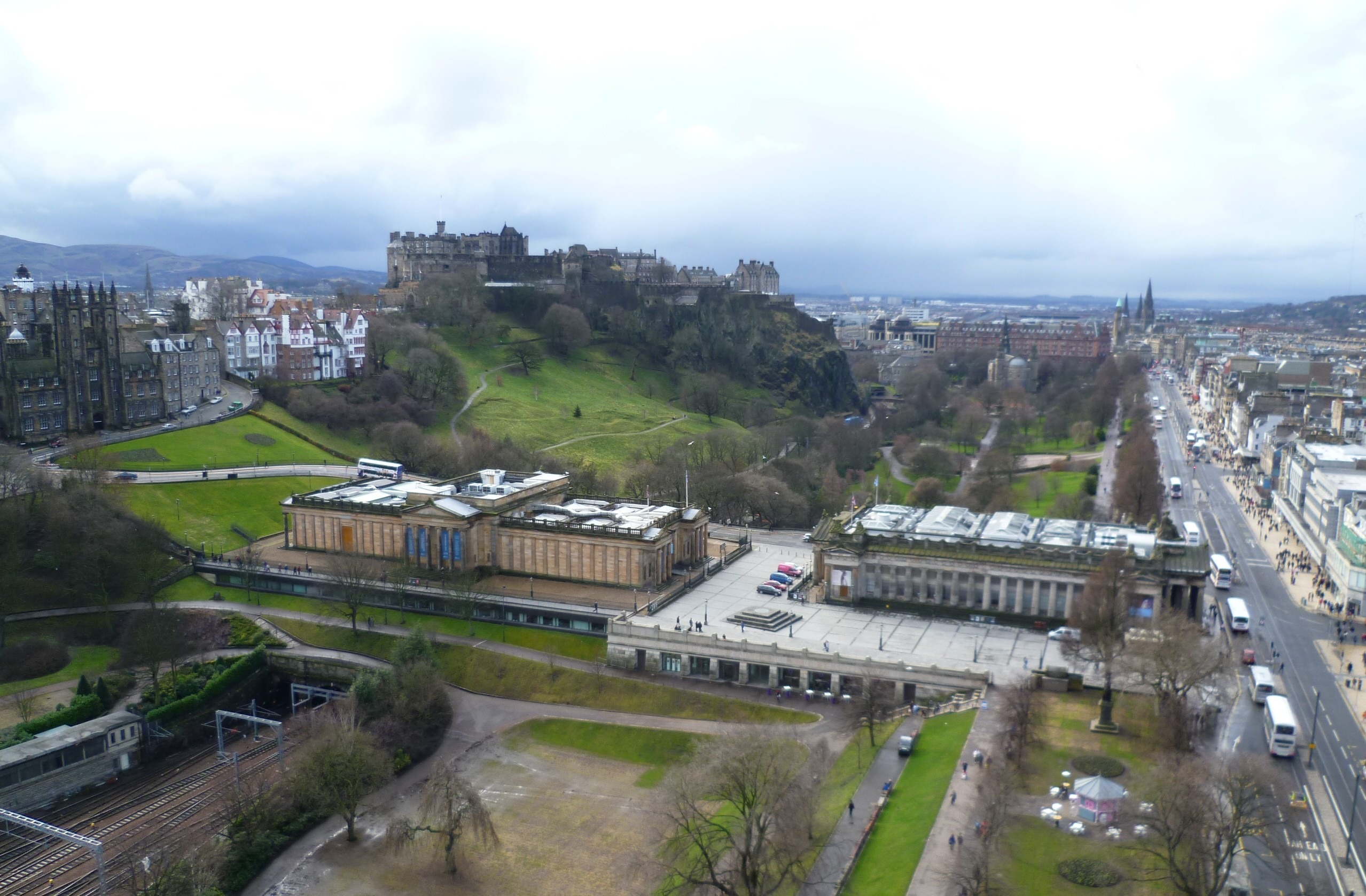
Three Edinburgh buildings by Playfair

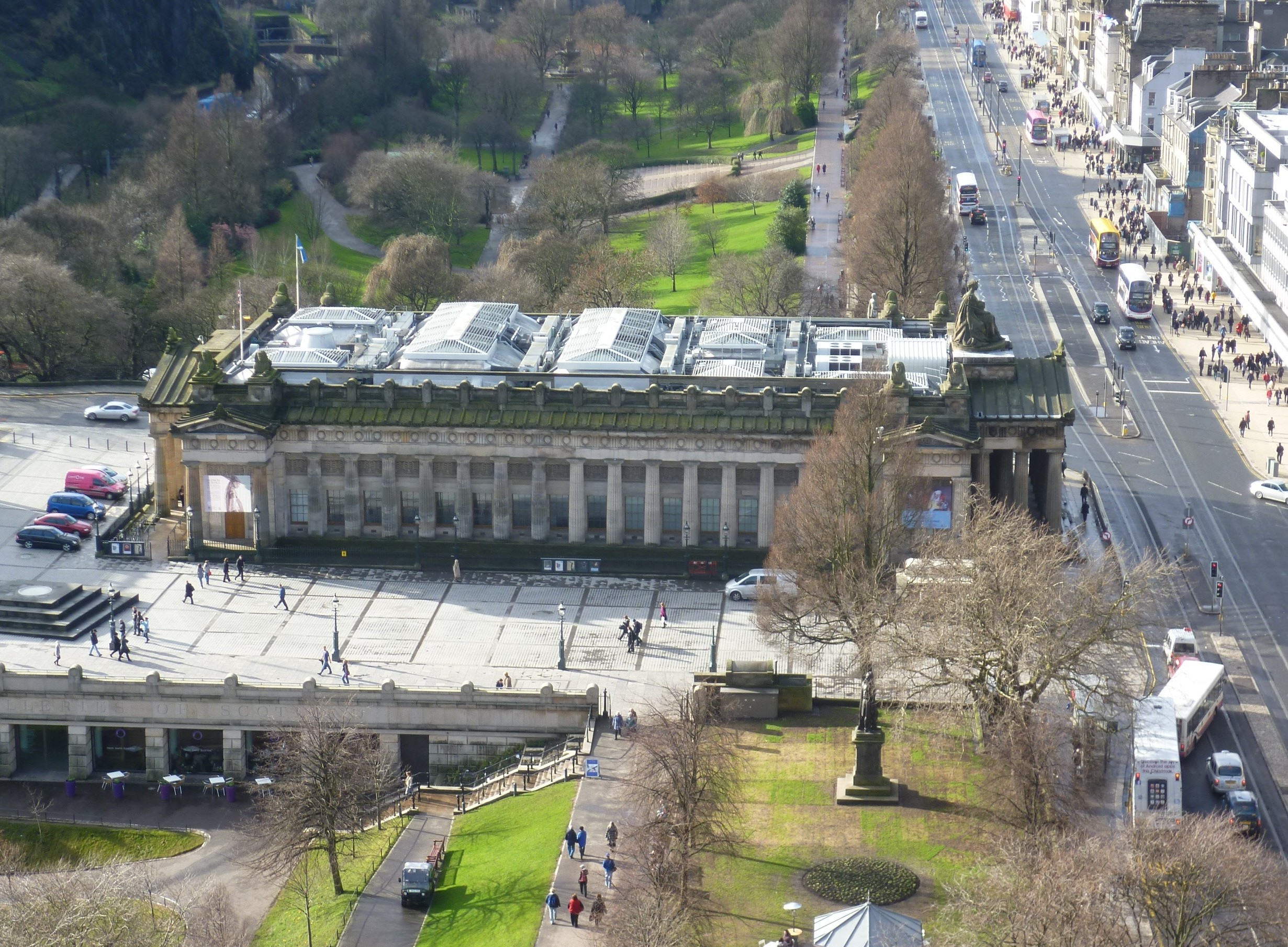
Royal Scottish Academy

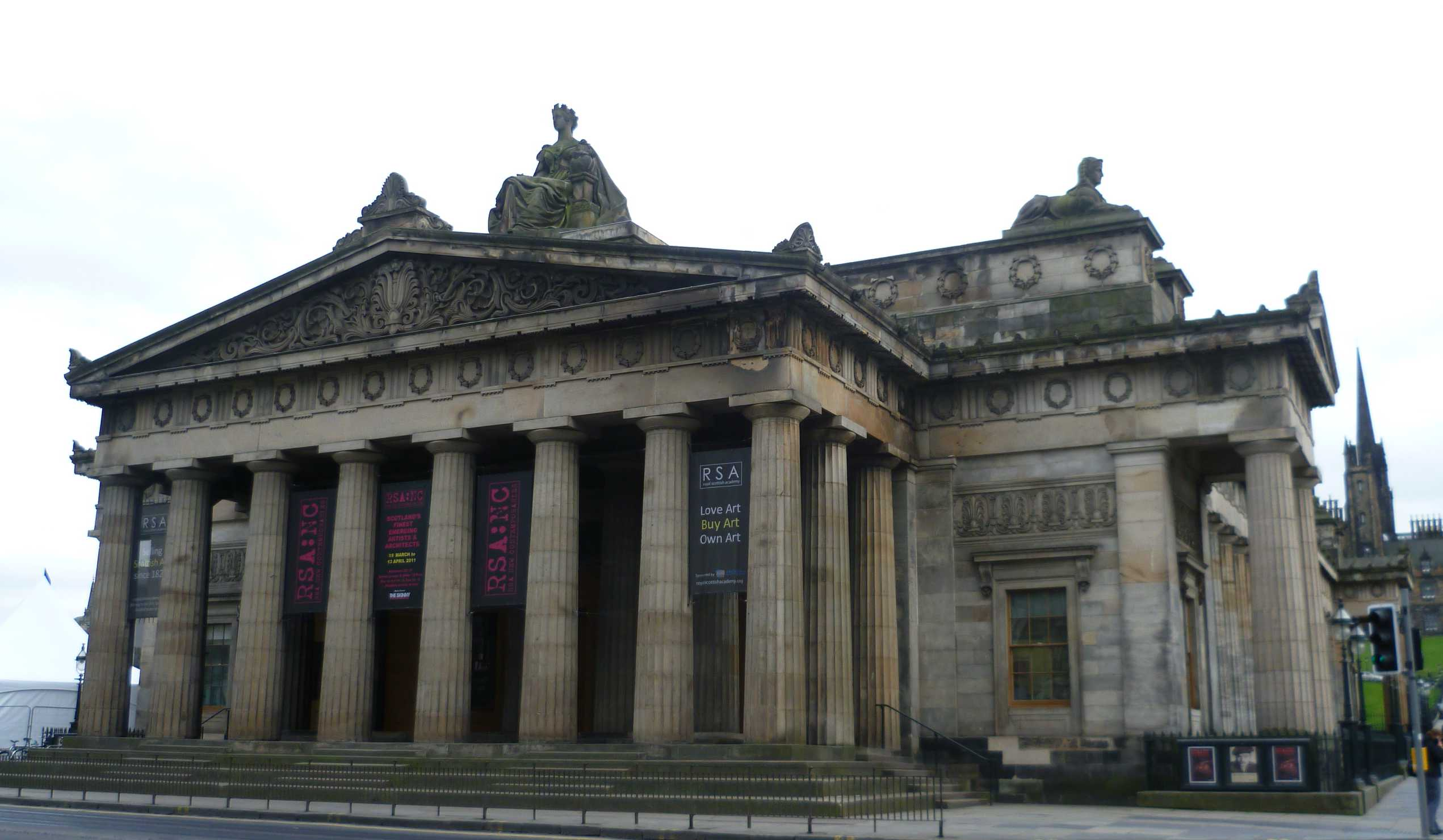
Royal Scottish Academy frontage

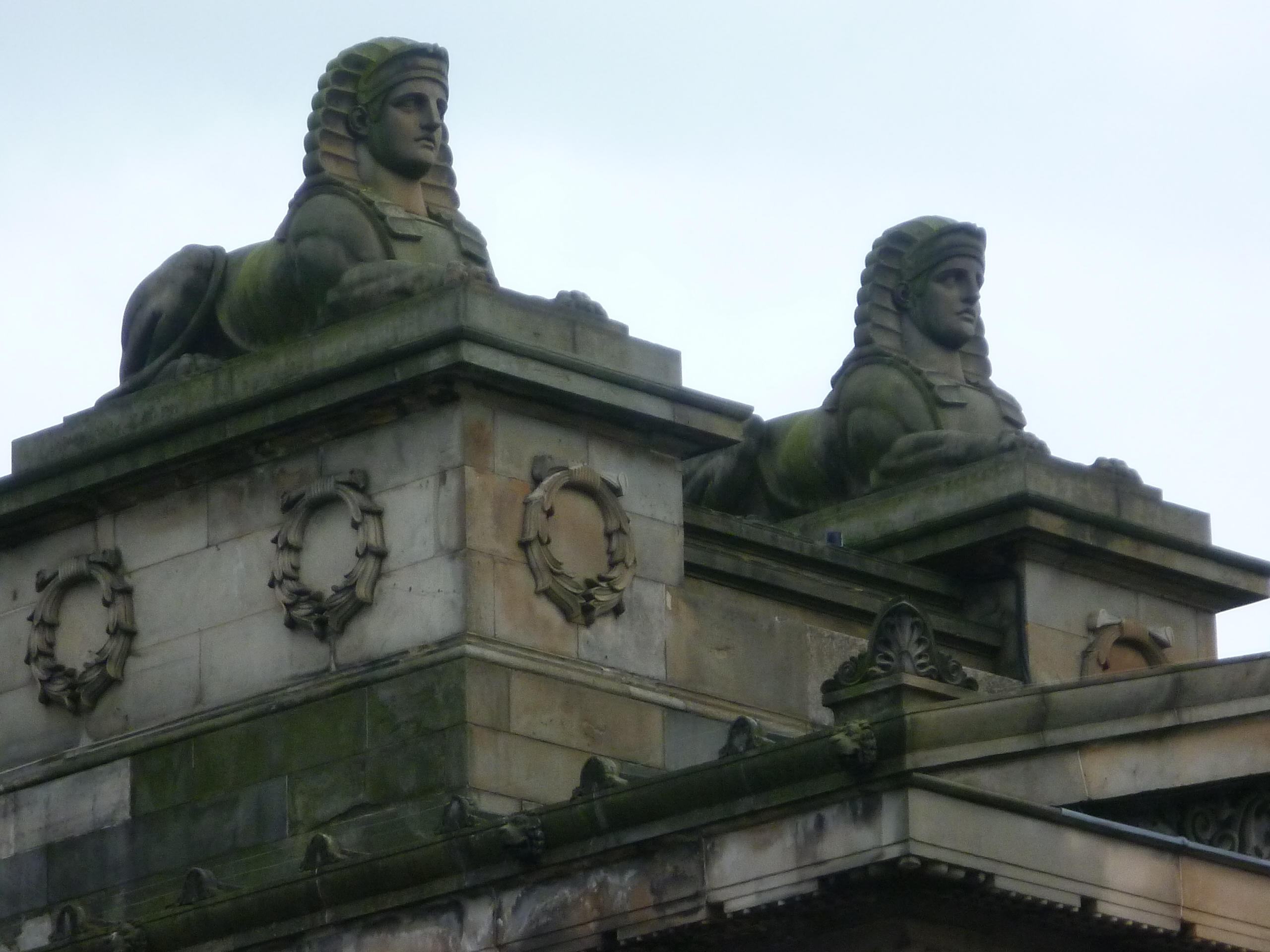
Sphinxes on the Royal Scottish Academy

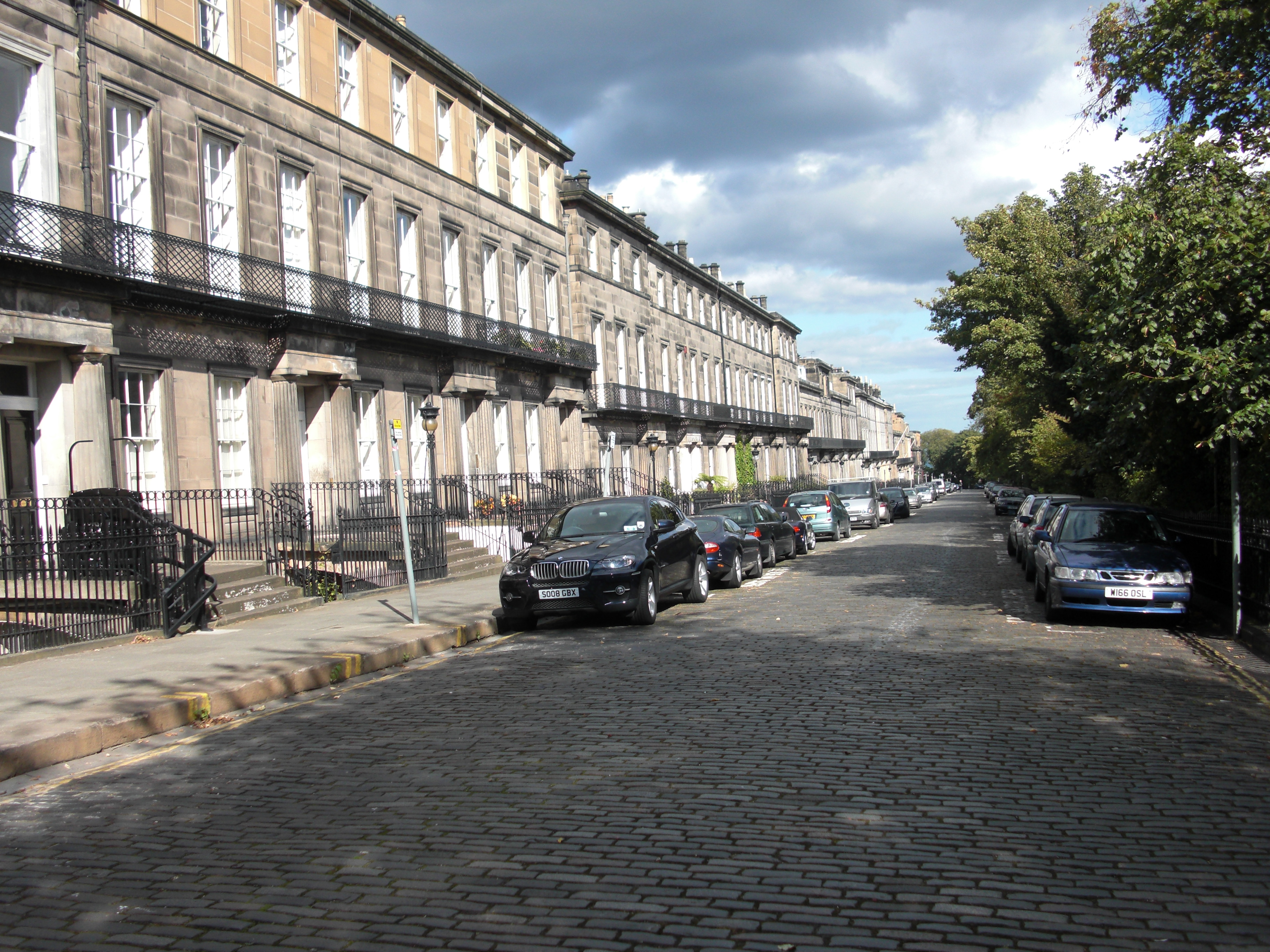
Regent Terrace, Edinburgh

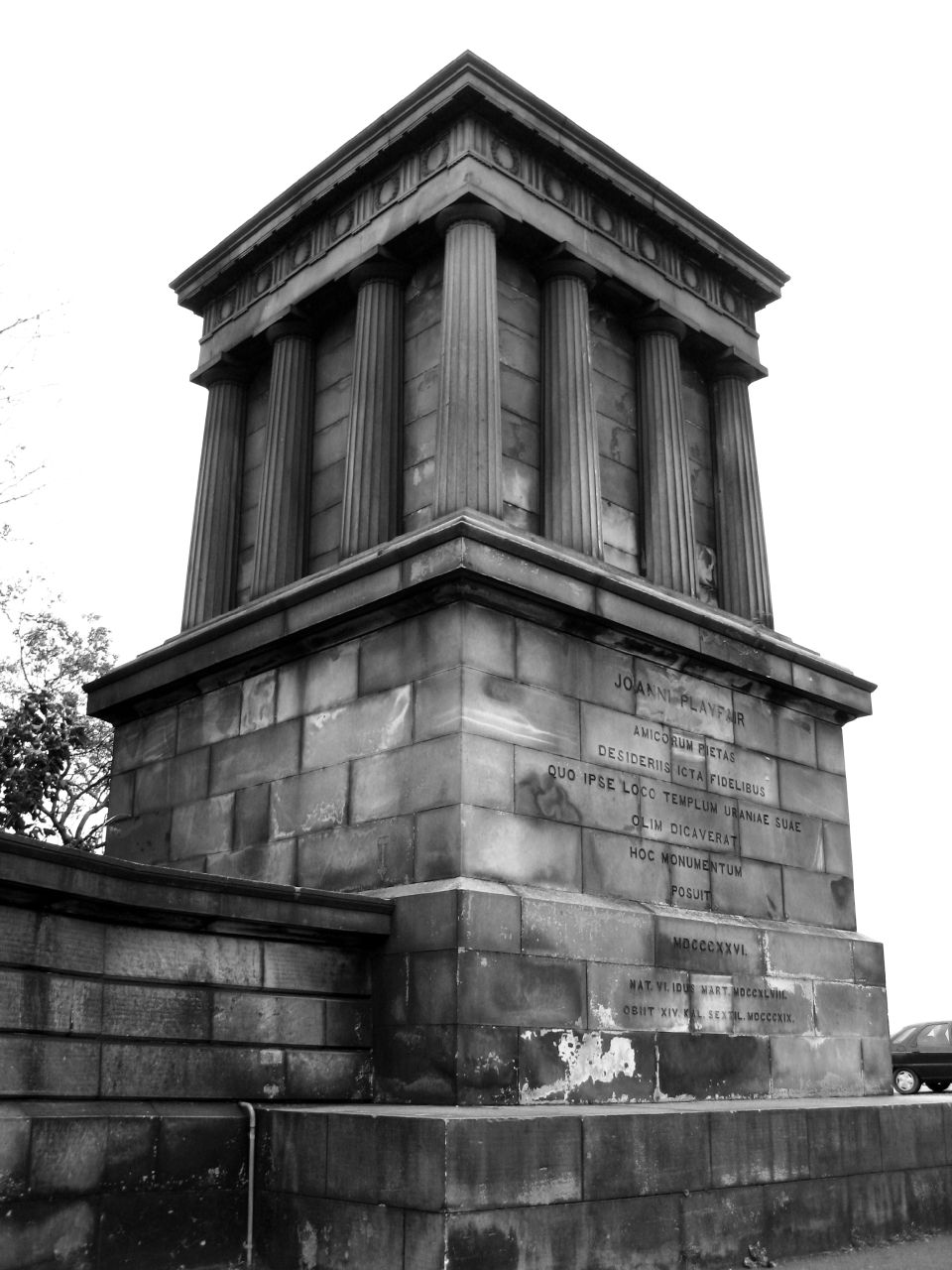
John Playfair Monument, Calton Hill, Edinburgh

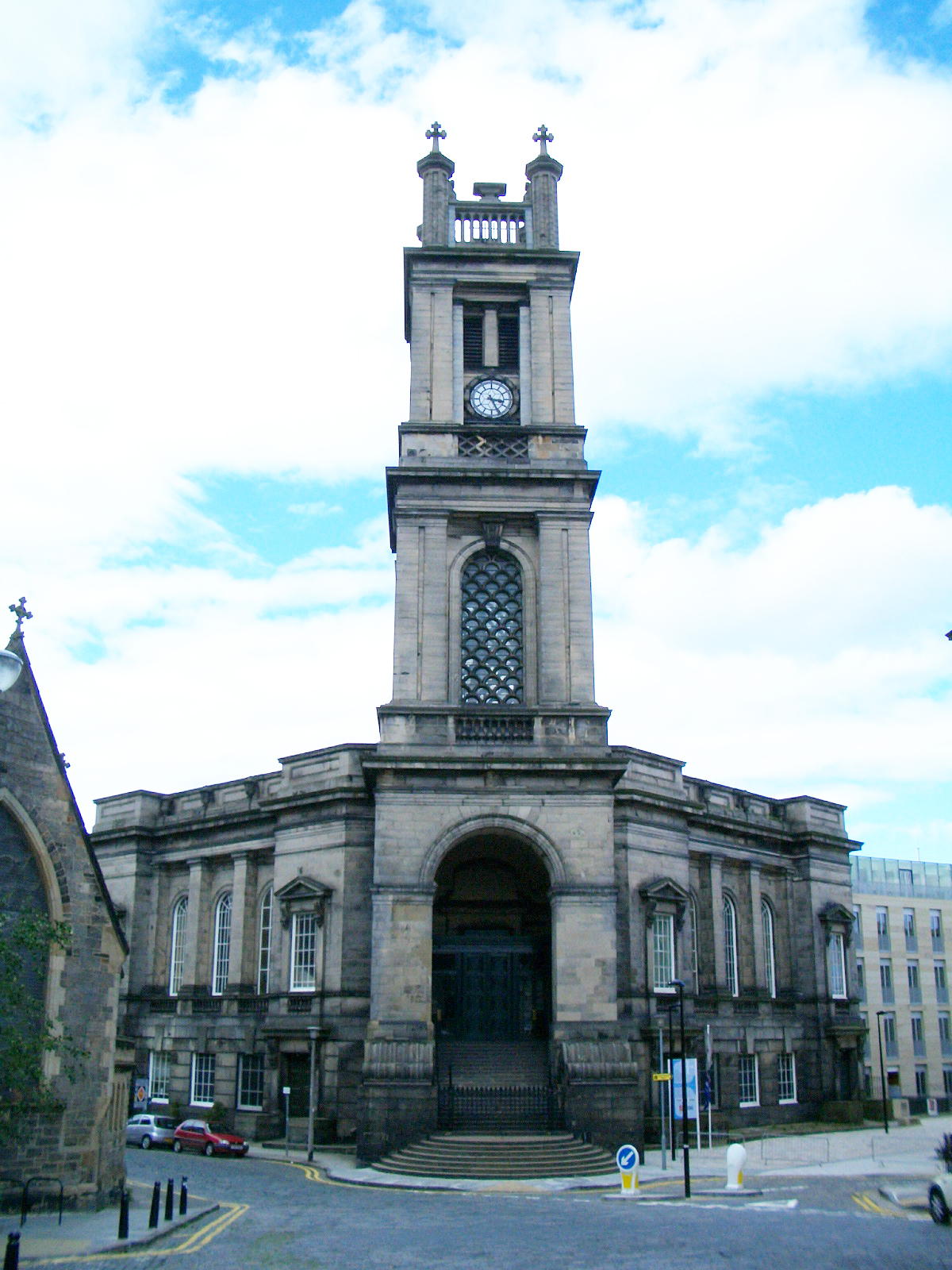
St. Stephen's Church Edinburgh

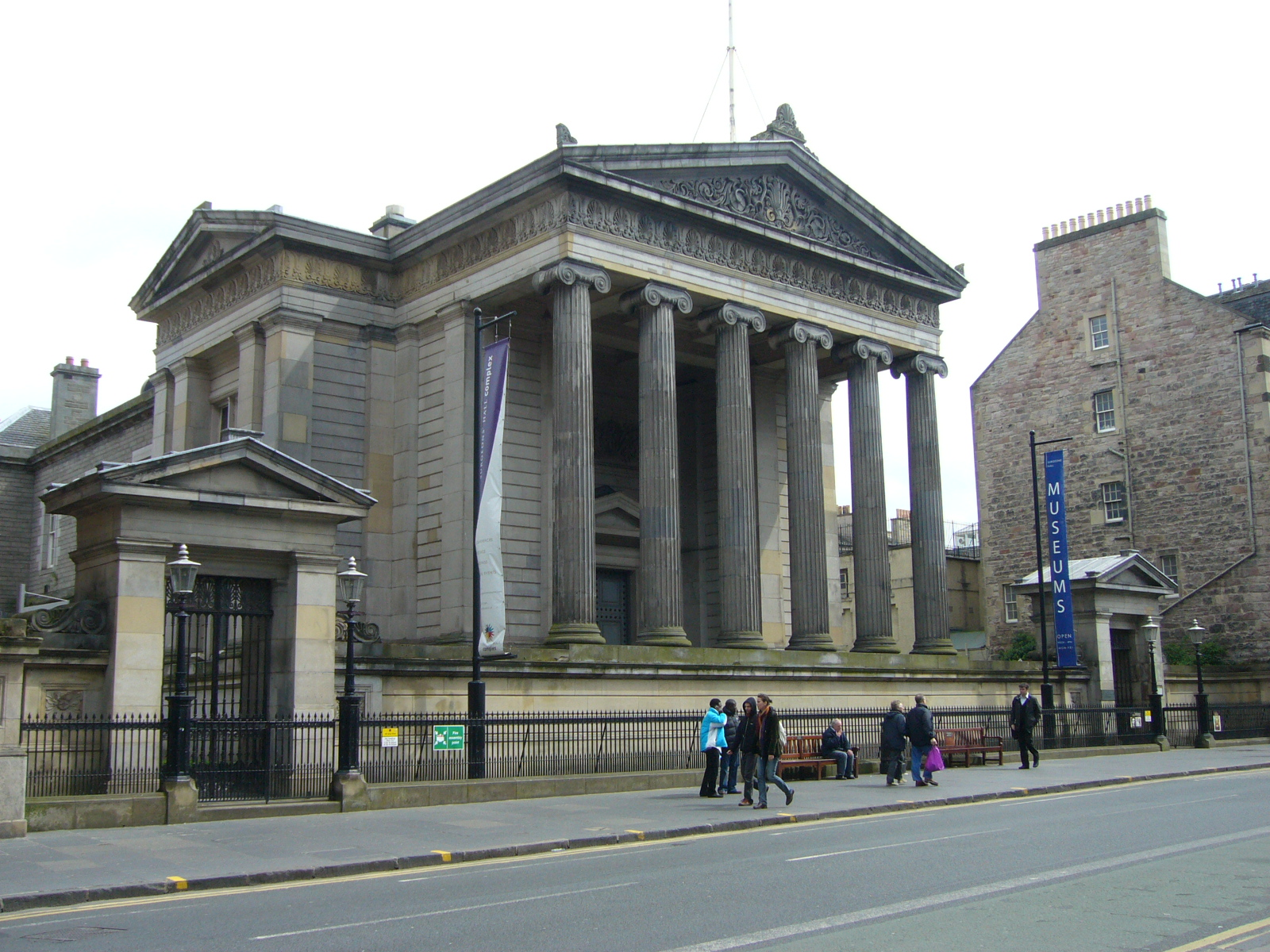
Surgeons' Hall, Edinburgh

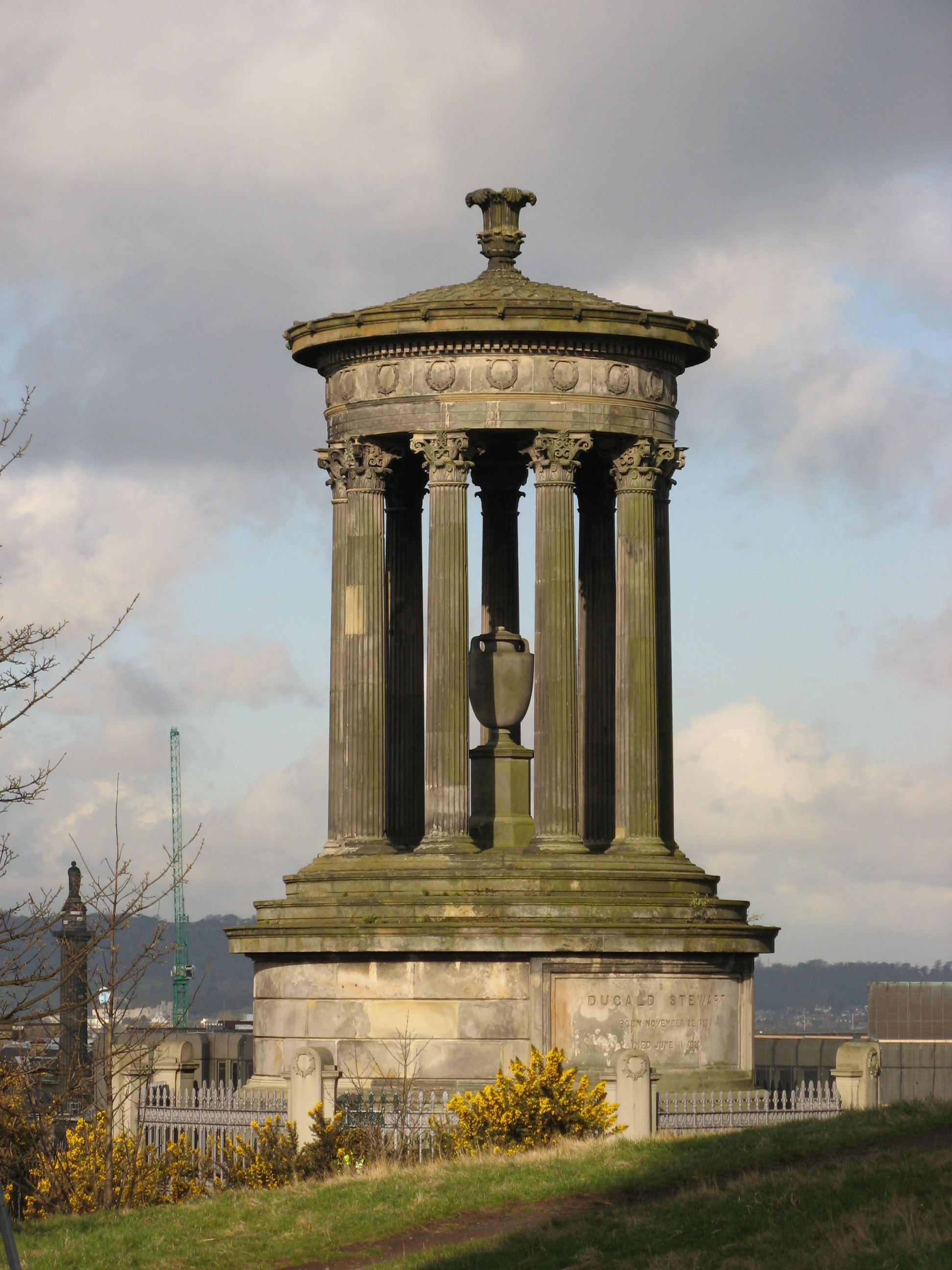
Dugald Stewart Monument, Calton Hill, Edinburgh

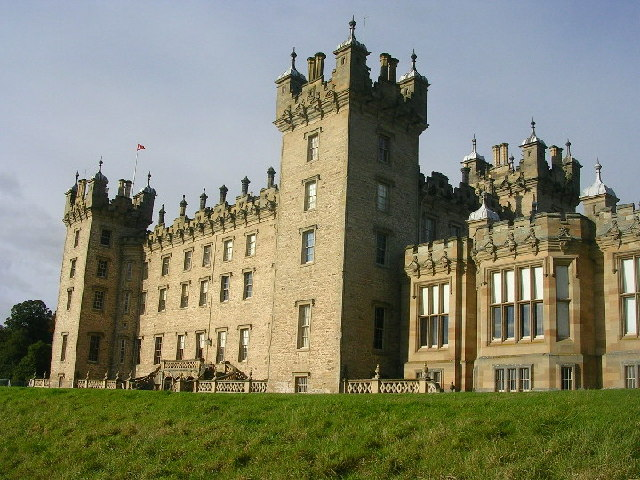
Floors Castle, near Kelso

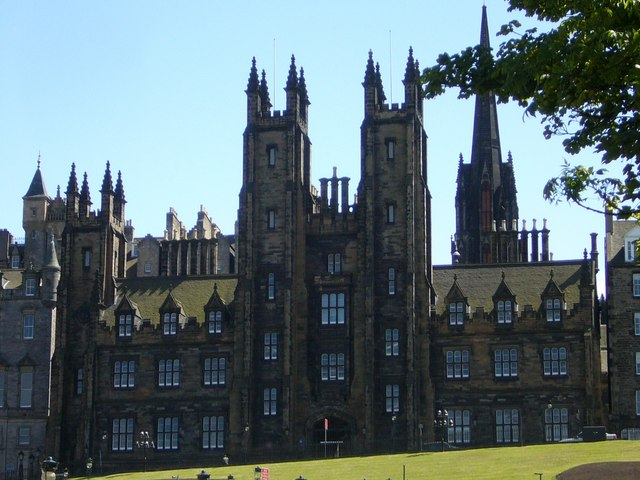
New College, Edinburgh

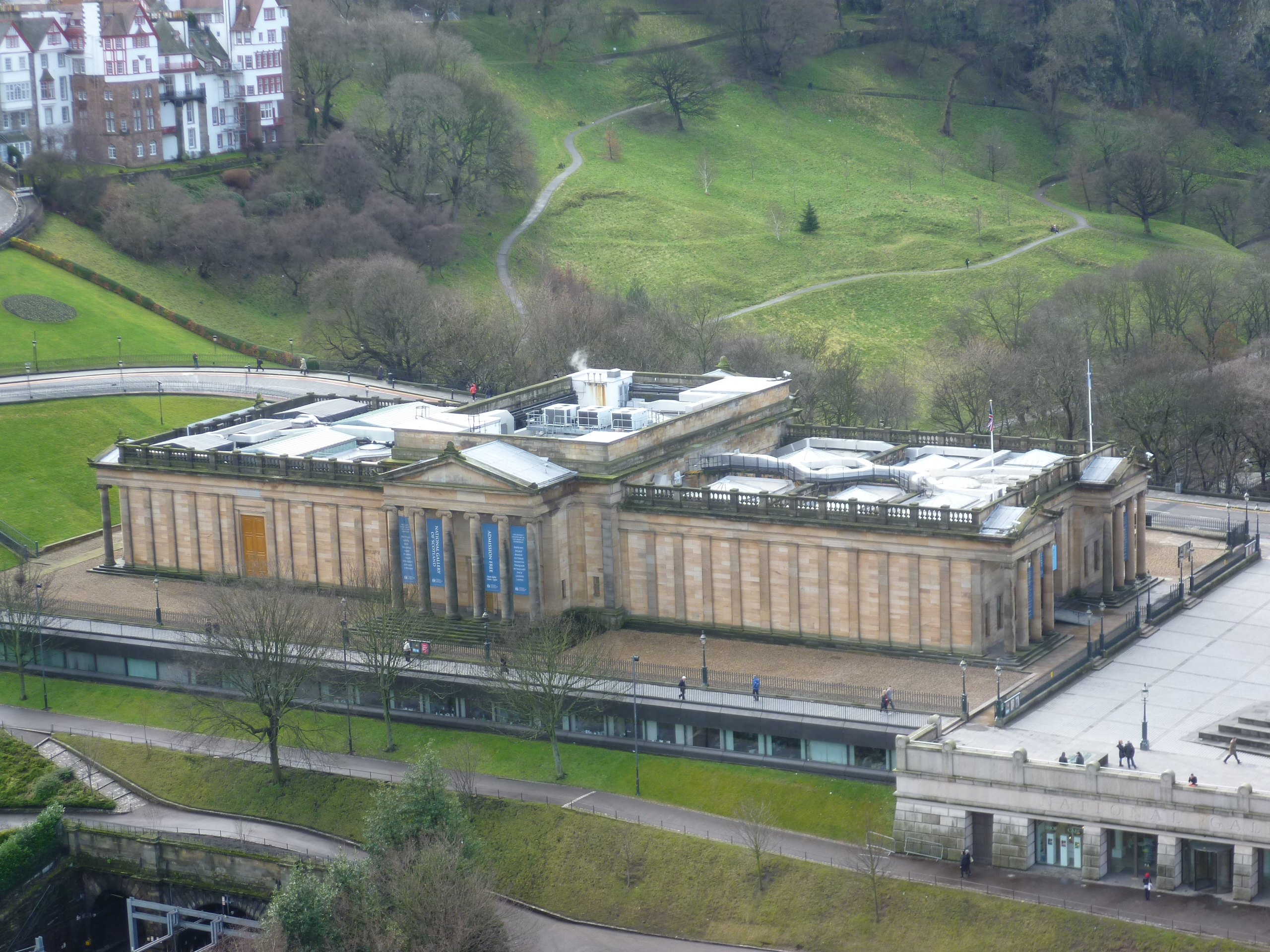
National Gallery of Scotland, Edinburgh

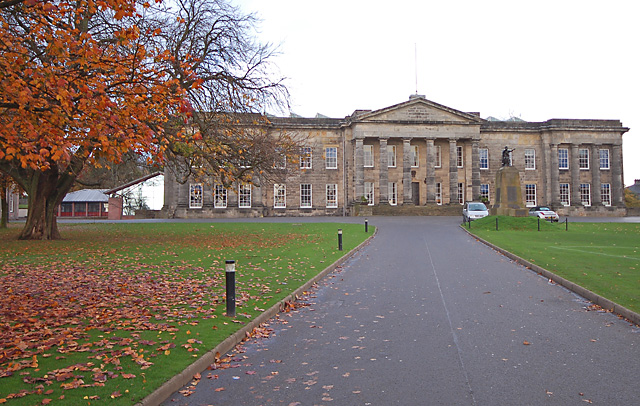
Dollar Academy, Clackmannanshire

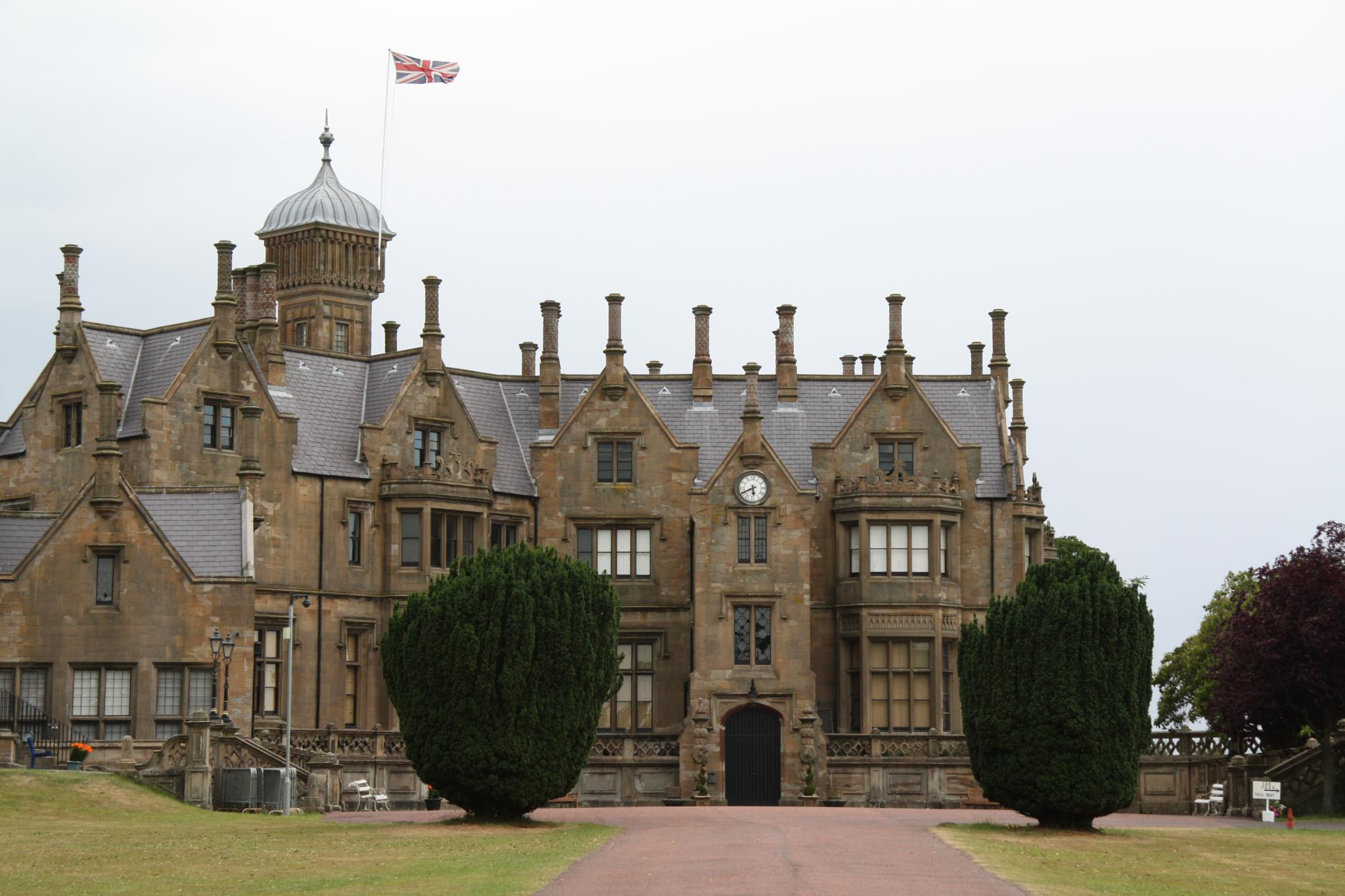
Brownlow House, Lurgan, County Armagh, Northern Ireland

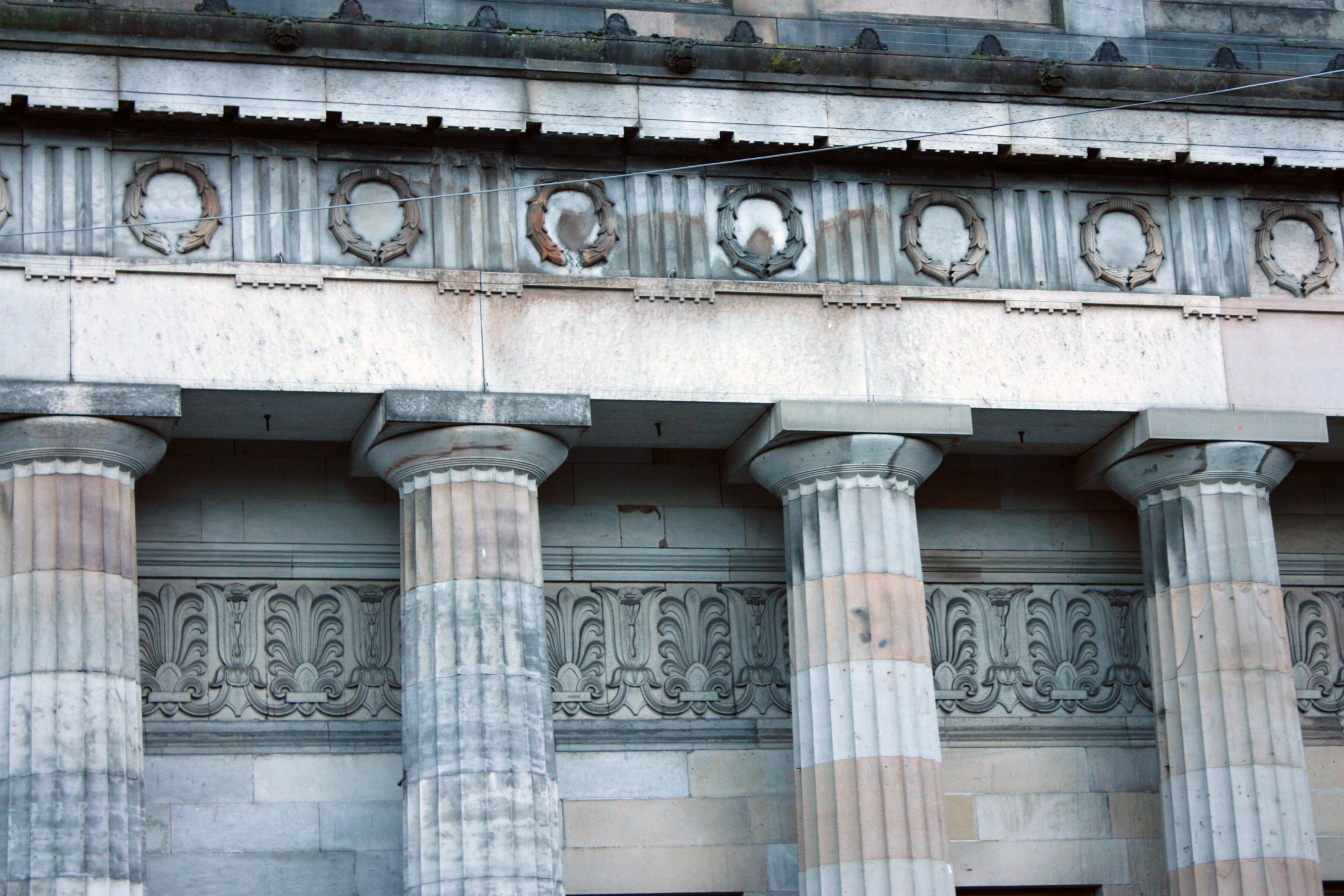
Fine detailing by Playfair on the Royal Scottish Academy

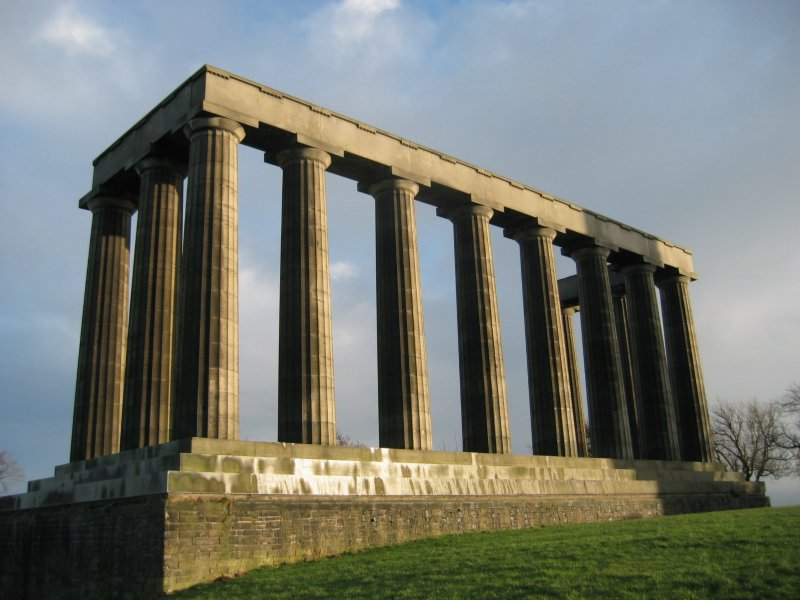
The unfinished National Monument, Edinburgh, begun in 1826

== Sources ==
- Parks & Gardens, UK
