= James Ritchie & Son =

Scottish clockmakers

- Founded: 1809
- Headquarters: Broxburn, Scotland
- Products: clocks
- Parent: Smith of Derby Group from 2013
- Website: James Ritchie

James Ritchie & Son are a firm of Clockmakers in Broxburn, West Lothian, Scotland. The company was established in 1809 and is Scotland's oldest turret clock manufacturer.

The firm produces and maintains all sorts of clocks, including public clocks. The company is contracted to wind, set, repair and clean many of the public clocks in Edinburgh and since 2015 has converted many of the city's clocks windings to automatic mechanisms.

== History ==
The clockmakers was established by James Ritchie in 1809 at 29 Leith Street. In 1819, the company acquired the clockmaking business of another Edinburgh clockmaker, Joseph Durward. By 1836 the company had changed its name to James Ritchie & Son. James Ritchie died in 1849 and was succeeded by Frederick James Ritchie (1828-1906) who continued to manage the business. The firm was a recipient of the clockmaking Reid Auld prize on several occasions. In 1906, the firm passed to Frederick II, son of Frederick James and his descendants but suffered from financial difficulties over the coming decades. In 1953, the Leith Street premises were sold and the last remaining Ritchie (Leone) retired, passing control to his nephew, Robert Mitchell who moved the firm to Broughton St. The firm was subsequently purchased by Frank Pritchard, an earlier apprentice of Mitchells. In 2003, the firm relocated to Broxburn in West Lothian. In 2013, the firm was acquired by the English clockmakers Smith of Derby but continues to operate under its own name as a subsidiary.

== Works ==
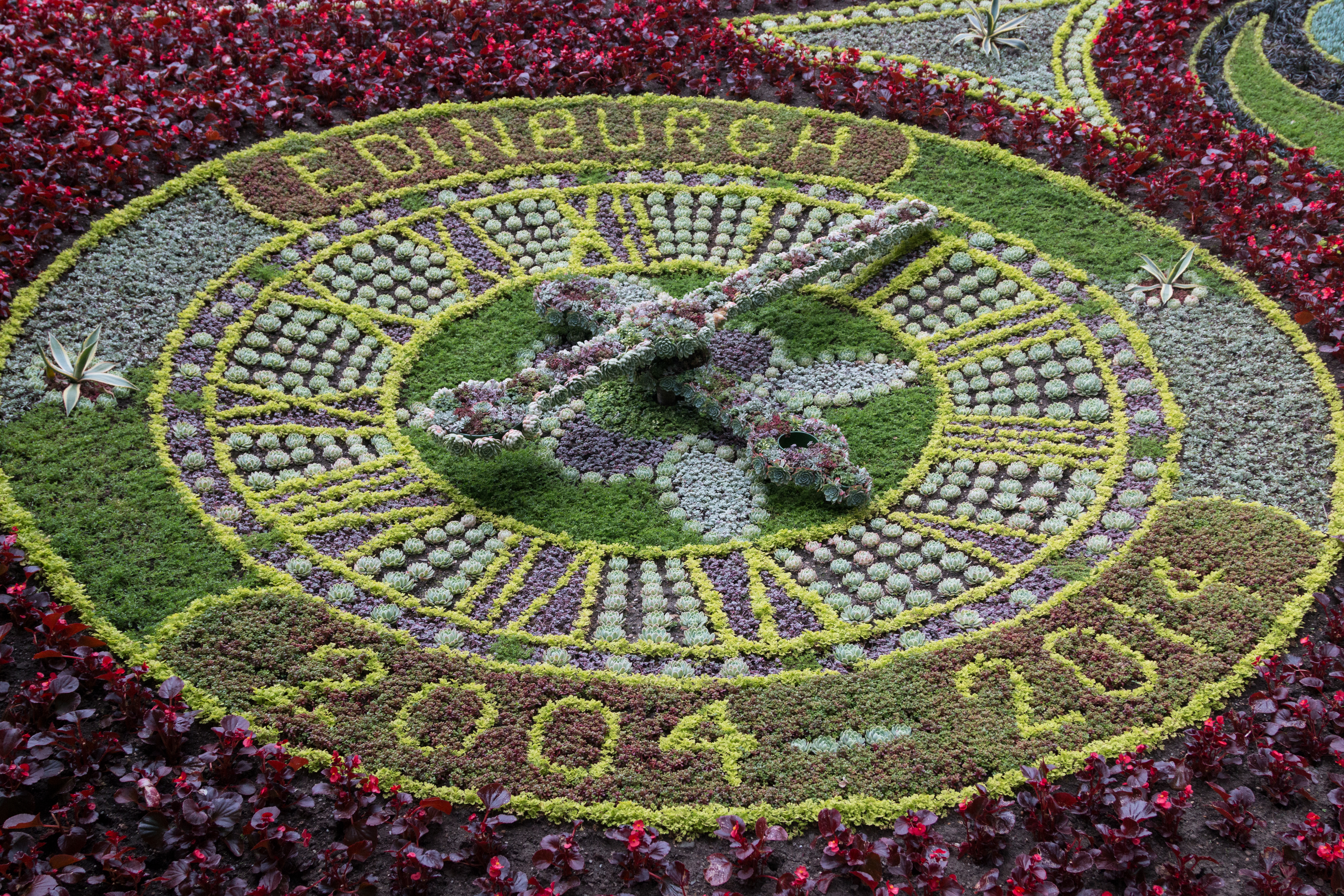
The Edinburgh Floral Clock, the clock mechanism is by James Ritchie & Son

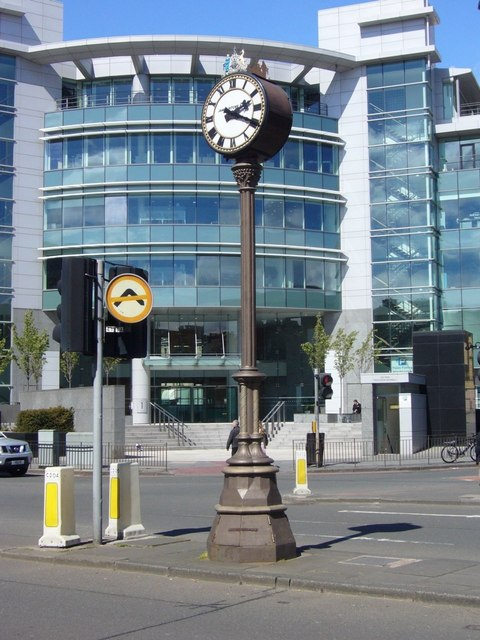
The Tollcross Clock in Edinburgh

Their works include:

- The installation of the Calton Hill 'Time Ball' on top of the Nelson Monument in Edinburgh that links with the One O'Clock Gun at Edinburgh Castle. The company continue to maintain the clock today for Edinburgh City Council. From 1861, the gun clock was controlled by electric telegraph signal from the Observatory which was the responsibility of Frederick James Ritchie, son of the founder of the company.
- St Stephen's Church, Edinburgh 1828 with the longest clock pendulum in Europe at 60 feet (18 m) with a period of 8.6 seconds.
- The Floral clock of Princes Street Gardens, one of the first of its kind in the world.
- The circular clock of the Heart of Midlothian War Memorial at Haymarket, unveiled in 1922.
- The fitting of a new automatic mechanism on the clock of St Magnus Cathedral in 2018.
- The pillar clocks in Morningside, Tron Square and at Tollcross (a 2-faced clock from 1901). In March 2022, the Tollcross clock was removed by the council due to 'health and safety concerns' and details of its restoration are not yet known.
- The repair and maintenance of St. Bride's Church clock in Douglas, South Lanarkshire. The church is Scotland's oldest known working public clock.
- The production and ongoing maintenance of the non-dial chiming clock of St Giles' Cathedral, installed in 1911.
- The clock on the gothic spire of the Hub in Edinburgh (formerly known as the Highland Tolbooth St John's Church).
- The ogival-roofed clock on brackets of the Canongate Tolbooth. The clock casing and mechanism were produced by the firm in 1884.
- St Cuthbert's Church, Edinburgh 1902

As well as tower clocks, the company specialises in public clocks of smaller sizes, for example the former station clock of the old Fort William railway station was made by the firm. A working model of a tower clock built by the company is in the grand gallery of the National Museum of Scotland on Chambers Street.
