= Dugald Stewart Monument =

Memorial in Edinburgh, Scotland

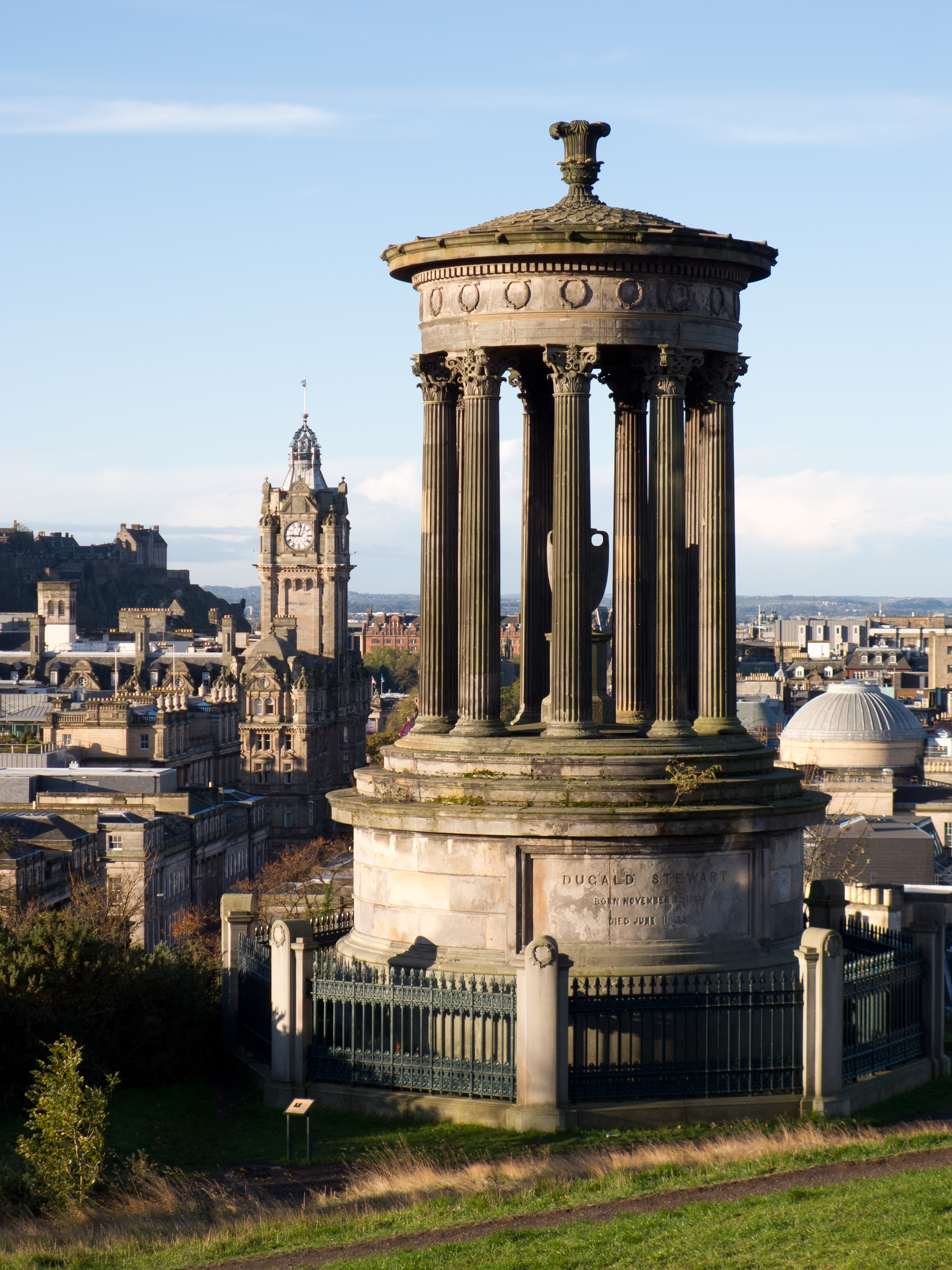
- Interactive map of Dugald Stewart Monument
- Location: Calton Hill, Edinburgh, Scotland
- Coordinates: 55°57′19″N 3°10′56″W
- Designer: William Henry Playfair
- Material: stone
- Completion date: August 1831; 194 years ago
- Dedicated to: Dugald Stewart

The Dugald Stewart Monument is a memorial to the Scottish Enlightenment philosopher Dugald Stewart (1753–1828). It is situated on Calton Hill overlooking the city of Edinburgh and was designed by Scottish architect William Henry Playfair.

== Background ==
Dugald Stewart was a professor at the University of Edinburgh and a key figure during the Scottish Enlightenment, holding the chair of moral philosophy from 1786 until he died in 1828. The Royal Society of Edinburgh commissioned the monument and selected its site in 1830. It was completed in September 1831, and is a category A listed building as of 19 April 1966.

Playfair's design is based on the Choragic Monument of Lysicrates in Athens, Greece, and is a circular temple of nine fluted Corinthian columns around an elevated urn, on a circular podium. This example of the architecture of ancient Greece had been brought to wider attention by James "Athenian" Stuart and Nicholas Revett's illustrated survey, The Antiquities of Athens, published in 1762. The choragic form was also used for the nearby contemporaneous Robert Burns Monument, designed by Thomas Hamilton.

Playfair also designed the nearby National Monument of Scotland (with Charles Robert Cockerell) and was also responsible for the thoroughfare that encircles Calton Hill on three sides, comprising Royal Terrace, Carlton Terrace and Regent Terrace.

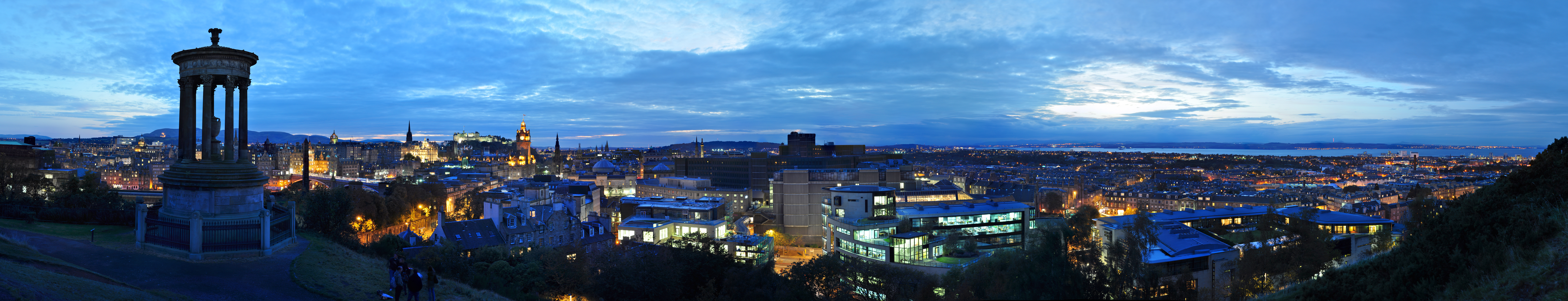
180° panorama of the Edinburgh skyline at dusk in early October from Calton Hill, Dugald Stewart Monument
