= Robert Inglis =

Robert Inglis may refer to:

- Robert Inglis (merchant) (died 1655), Scottish merchant financier in London
- Sir Robert Inglis, 2nd Baronet (1786–1855), English Conservative politician
- Rob Inglis (1933–2021), audiobook narrator, actor and playwright
- Bob Inglis (born 1959), American politician
- Robert Inglis (engineer) (1881–1962), Scots-born railway engineer
