= National Monument of Scotland =

Monument in City of Edinburgh, Scotland

Coordinates: 55°57′17.0″N 3°10′54.5″W

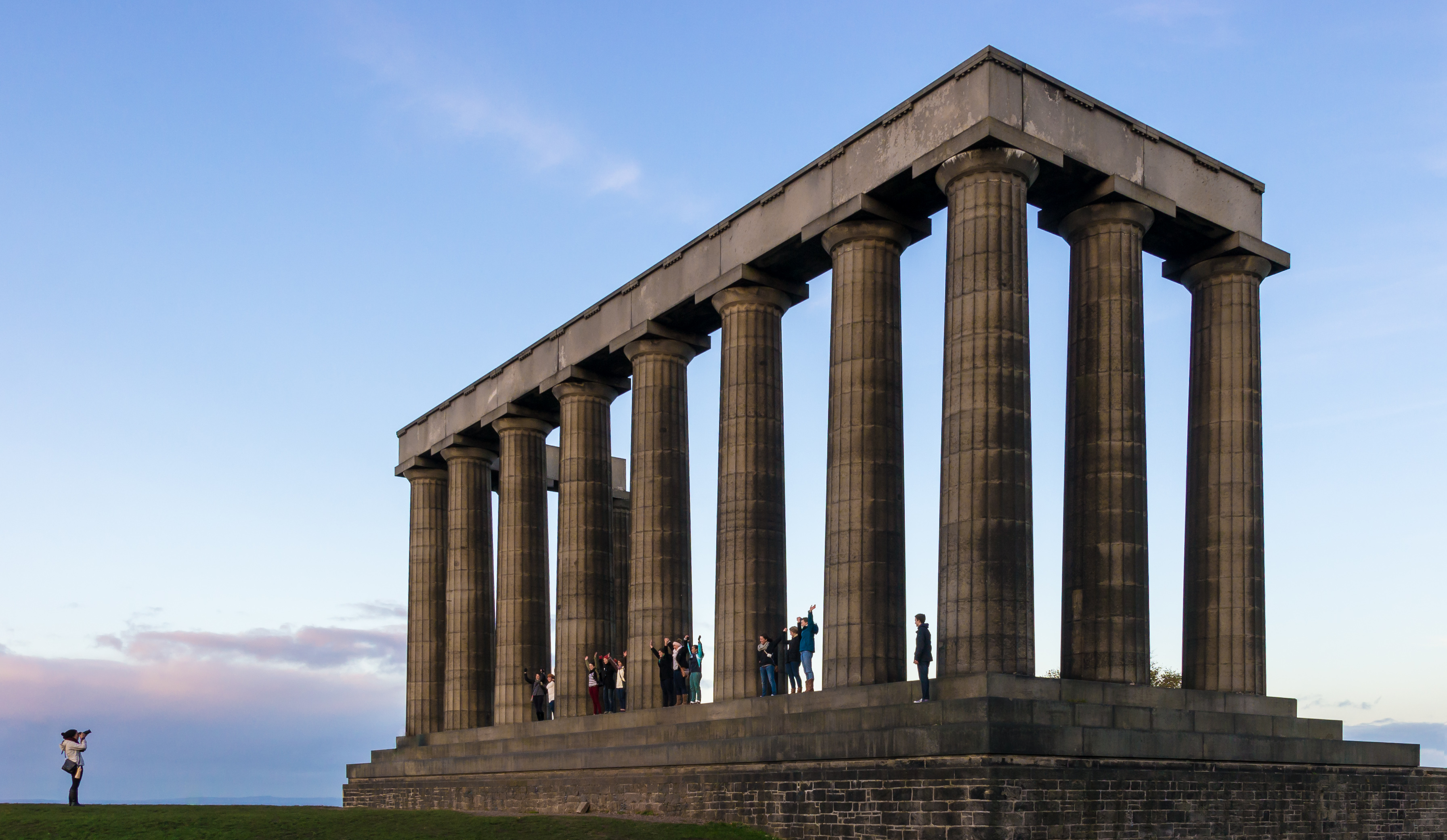
The National Monument of Scotland

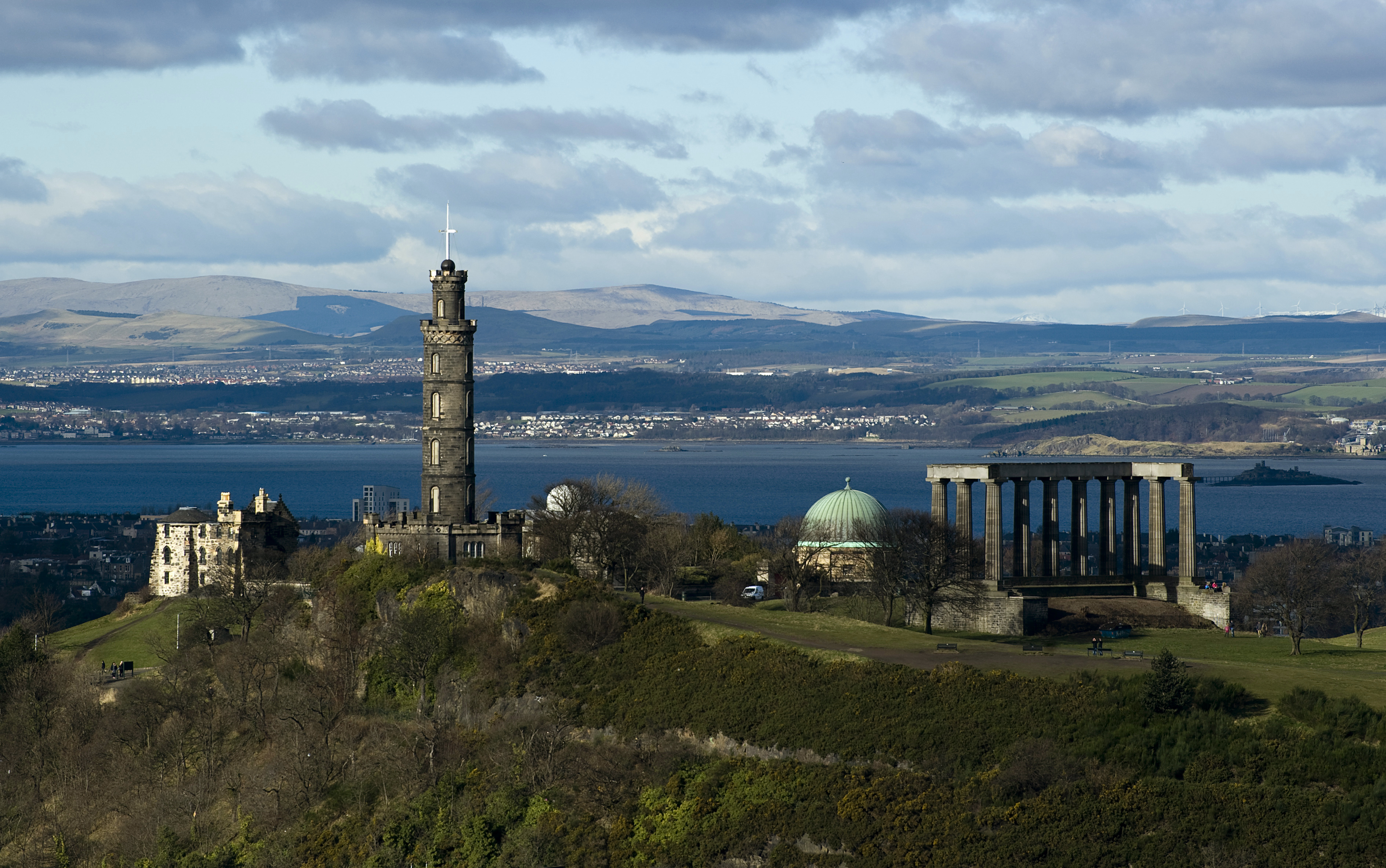
The National Monument (right), viewed from the Salisbury Crags with Nelson's Monument on the left

The National Monument of Scotland, on Calton Hill in Edinburgh, is Scotland's national memorial to the Scottish soldiers and sailors who died fighting in the Napoleonic Wars. It was intended, according to the inscription, to be "A Memorial of the Past and Incentive to the Future Heroism of the Men of Scotland".

The monument dominates the top of Calton Hill, just to the east of Princes Street. It was designed during 1823–1826 by Charles Robert Cockerell and William Henry Playfair and is modeled upon the Parthenon in Athens. Construction started in 1826 and, due to the lack of funds, was left unfinished in 1829. This circumstance gave rise to various nicknames such as "Scotland's Folly", "Edinburgh's Disgrace", "Scotland's Pride and Poverty" and "Edinburgh's Folly".

== Proposals ==
As early as 1816, the Highland Society of Scotland called for the construction of a national monument to commemorate the fallen in the Napoleonic Wars. Initially The Mound was considered as a site, but was rejected in favour of Calton Hill.

National Monument in Scotland Act 1822
- Act of Parliament
- Parliament of the United Kingdom
- Long title: An Act to incorporate the Contributors for the Erection of a National Monument in Scotland to commemorate the Naval and Military Victory obtained during the late War.
- Citation: 3 Geo. 4. c. 100
- Territorial extent: United Kingdom

Dates
- Royal assent: 30 July 1822
- Commencement: 30 July 1822 (Note: The Acts of Parliament (Commencement) Act 1793.)
Other legislation
Amended by	National Monument in Scotland Act 1848

Status: Amended

Text of statute as originally enacted

In January 1822, a proposal was put forward to 'erect a facsimile of the Parthenon' at a cost of some £42,000. The appeal found support amongst many prominent Edinburgh residents such as Sir Walter Scott, Henry, Lord Cockburn and Francis, Lord Jeffrey. The leading man behind the campaign to model the new monument specifically on the Athenian Parthenon was Thomas Bruce, 7th Earl of Elgin, who had controversially removed many of the temple's sculptures (now known as the Elgin Marbles) a decade earlier and brought them to Britain. In July 1822 the Royal Association of Contributors to the National Monument of Scotland was incorporated by an act of Parliament, the National Monument in Scotland Act 1822 (3 Geo. 4. c. 100). The foundation stone was laid, amid great pomp and ceremony, the following month.

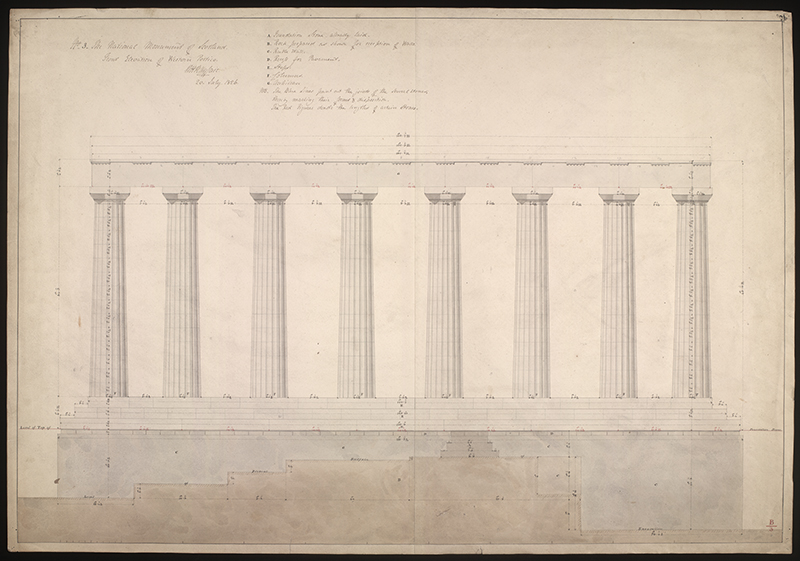
Drawing of the front elevation of the Western Portico of the National Monument of Scotland, by William Henry Playfair, dated 1826

Sixteen months after the initial appeal, only £16,000 had been found with the possibility of a £10,000 grant from Parliament. In 1826, the building was finally commissioned and work began. The builder contracted to execute the work was Messrs William Wallace & Son.

Originally, the building was planned to have extensive catacombs in the area supporting the main structure, to provide a burial place for significant figures, intended as a "Scottish Valhalla". A minute of the Royal Association in 1826 stated that the building was:

to adopt the Temple of Minerva or Parthenon of Athens, as the model of the Monument, and to restore to the civilised world that celebrated and justly admired edifice, without any deviation whatever, excepting the adaptation of the sculpture to the events and achievements of the Scottish Heroes, whose prowess and glory it is destined to commemorate and perpetuate, and part of which monument or building must, in terms of the said Act, be appropriated as a church or place of Divine worship, to be maintained in all time coming by the said Association

=== Laying of the foundation stone ===
The foundation stone, which weighs 6 tons, was laid on 27 August 1822, during the visit of George IV to Scotland.

The Duke of Hamilton (the most senior non-royal Scottish noble and the Grand Master of Scotland) led a procession of masonic lodges, royal commissioners and other dignitaries from Parliament Square to the top of Calton Hill. The procession was escorted by the Scots Greys and the 3rd Dragoons.

The deposition of the inscription plates in the stone was accompanied by cannon salutes from Edinburgh Castle, Salisbury Crags, Leith Fort and the royal squadron on Leith Roads.

360° view of Calton Hill from the National Monument, Edinburgh. Nelson's Monument is visible between columns in the centre. To the right are views of Firth of Forth. To the left are Arthur's Seat, Salisbury Crags and Holyrood Park.

== Ideas for completion ==
Early proposals for completion work tended to focus on following the original plans; however, during the early 20th century several alternative plans were proposed:

- as a monument to Queen Victoria (1901)
- as a monument commemorating the 1707 Act of Union with England (1907)
- as a new Scottish National Gallery (1907)
- as a Scottish Parliament building (1908)
- as a memorial to those who fell in the Great War (1918, George Washington Browne)

Subsequent attempts to 'complete' the National Monument have never borne fruit for reasons of either cost or lack of local enthusiasm. A proposal in 2004 met with a mixed reception.

The monument was repaired in December 2008, repositioning one of the stone lintels that had moved out of alignment. The cost was £100,262.

== Protection ==
The National Monument was classified as a Category A Listed building in 1966. It is not a scheduled monument.
