= Caltongate =

Redevelopment project in Edinburgh, Scotland

Coordinates: 55.9519°N 3.1823°W

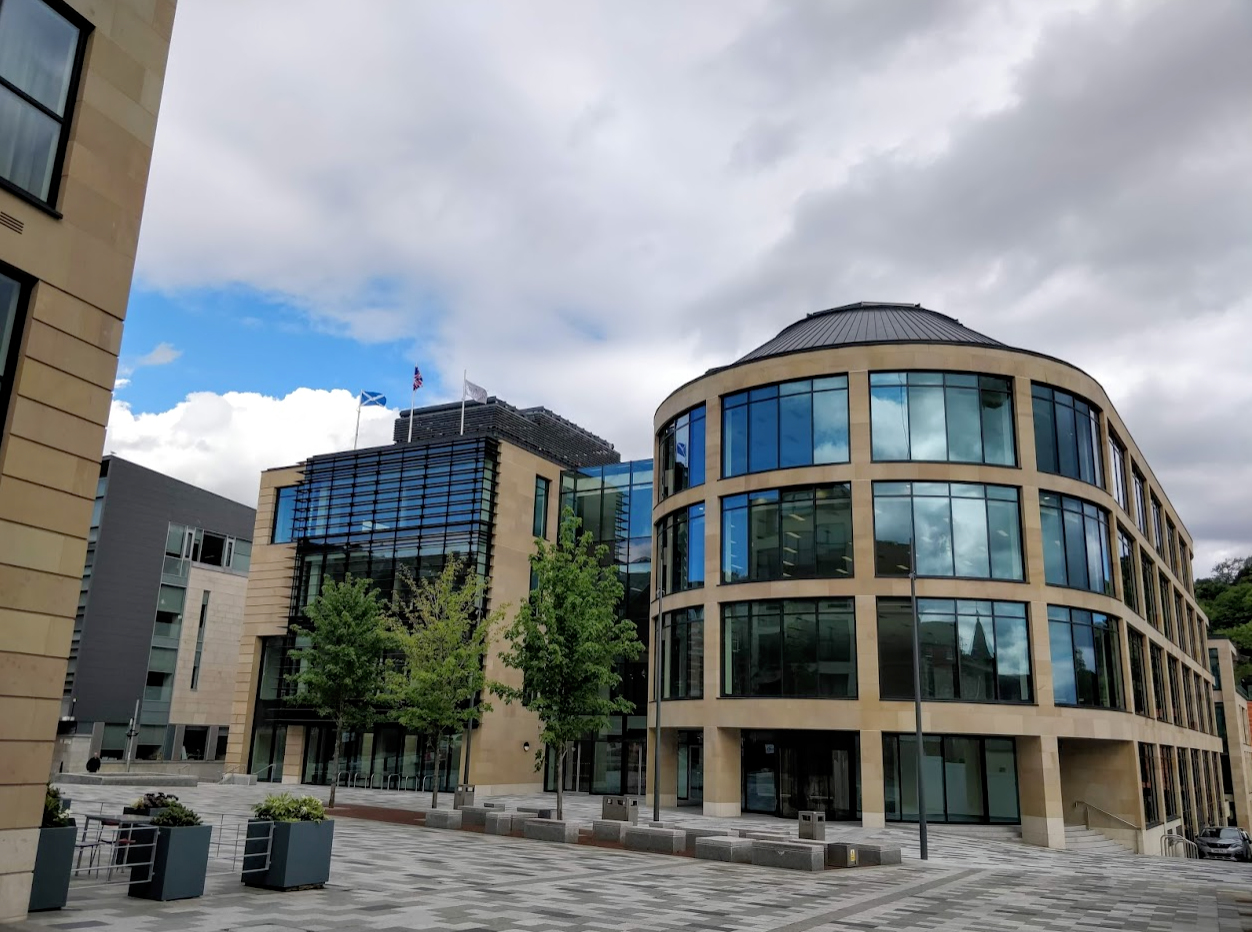
- Queen Elizabeth House, located on the Caltongate site
- Interactive map of Caltongate
- Other names: New Waverley, New Waverley Square
- Location: Old Town, Edinburgh
- Status: Incomplete
- Constructed: 2014 – present

Companies
- Architect: Allan Murray Associates

Caltongate, now known as New Waverley Square, is the largest city centre redevelopment project in Edinburgh since the 18th century. First proposed in 2005, it took 9 years to be approved by Edinburgh Council, after delays due to the 2008 financial crisis. The name Caltongate combines Canongate and Calton Hill, as the area lies on Canongate, and faces directly onto Calton Hill. Caltongate lies within the Old Town, Edinburgh, which was recognised as a UNESCO World Heritage site in 1994. Construction began in 2014 and is yet to be completed.

== History ==
=== Context ===
This section refers to the post-18th-century context relevant to the Caltongate development. If looking for a more comprehensive review of the history of this region, section 3 of this article is recommended.

In 1817, the site of the Caltongate development on New Street was initially built up as the New Street Gasworks along with the rise of coal gas alongside the industrial revolution. Due to a subsequent rise in coal pollution as well as the absence of a Scottish Monarchy and the dissolution of the Parliament of Scotland after the Acts of Union 1707, the status of Canongate was reduced and it became a primarily working-class neighbourhood. This is reflected by the high level of investment in social housing in Canongate in the first half of the 20th century.

By 1928 the New Street Gasworks had been demolished, and this area was turned into a Bus Depot. By 1996, the bus depot was no longer in use and was the host of The Bongo Club run by the arts charity Out of the Blue. In December 2003, full planning permission was granted to redevelop the former New Street Bus Depot. In September 2006, demolition of the bus depot began.

The construction of the modern Scottish Parliament Building down the road in Holyrood Palace and the neighbouring £50 million City of Edinburgh Council headquarters set a precedent for modern development in the Canongate area. A questionnaire directed to members of the public in 2006 identified that 89% of people agreed that the area around the Caltongate site needed generation.

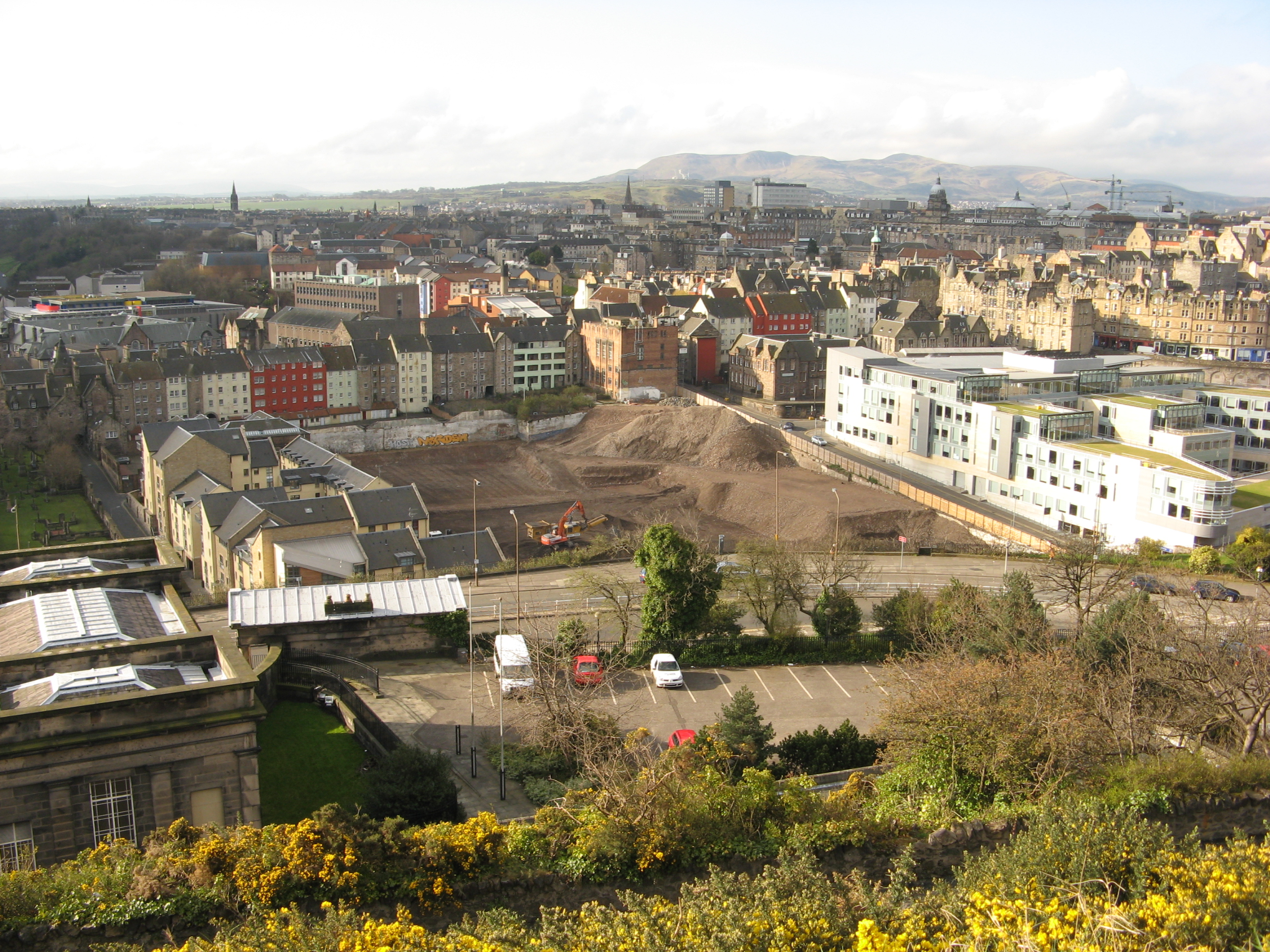
Site of the proposed Caltongate development

=== Development timeline ===
The New Street Bus Depot was purchased by Mountgrange Capital PLC for £20m in 2004, and in November 2005 the Council disposed of the Canongate Venture building, the Council Depot building and the Jeffrey Street arches to Mountgrange, which then proposed "Caltongate". Allan Murray Architects (also responsible for the controversial construction of St James Quarter) won the contract to design the development. There was a series of pre-planning activities which took place across the years 2004-2005 that consulted "key stakeholders, "advisors" and "various interest groups". A masterplan was also written to "maximise the opportunity for the area" This led to the proposed inclusion of a more detailed planning process and other physical elements to Caltongate such as affordable housing. This would supposedly be a £300 million scheme.

Details of the proposal were first publicised in the Edinburgh Evening News on 3 October 2005, and promised to link the Council Headquarters, Scottish Parliament, Holyrood North and the Moray House Campus. It envisioned an "increased population", "a major new public square" and a regeneration of Canongate. There was a "four-year battle with heritage groups" until it secured planning on 6 February 2008. However, due to the 2008 financial crisis, Mountgrange went into administration after a withdrawal of support from the Bank of Scotland and a slump in the property market, leading to a halt in the construction of Caltongate.

The project was taken over by Artisan Real Estate Investors in 2009, and went through a series of adaptations and was only narrowly voted through by the council on 29 January 2014 on an 8:6 split. The proposal diverted from its original form, offering 40% less housing and the intended larger commercial buildings had been 'broken up into more intimate individual units, improving the overall look and feel of the area'. By 2014 it had been reduced from a £300 million to a £150 million plan. At this point, the project was rebranded from 'Caltongate' to 'New Waverley'.

The construction of 'New Waverley' began in late 2014. The Waverley arches under Jeffrey Street started to host businesses in early 2016. Arches Artisan Real Estate Investors were legally entitled to demolish the listed buildings Sailors' Ark and Canongate Venture, but they were instead into hotels, with the former opened by Adagio city in 2016 and the latter by BrewDog in 2021. This is indicative of the efforts of the heritage campaigners. The UK Government Hub 'Queen Elizabeth House' opened in Spring 2020. The Queensberry Apartment complex was completed in 2021 and can be found on the east side of the Caltongate development, hosting 66 new homes, mews houses and maisonettes, along with first-class retail and commercial space.

As of December 2023, there is still an empty building site where there was supposed to be a residential building. Rather than matching the original plans of 87 residential units, there have been plans set forward by Vita Group to build new purpose-built student accommodation made up of shared flats for 65 individuals as well as 224 studio bedrooms. Additionally, there have been 3 affordable housing units allocated as well as 277 sqm of ground floor space for a commercial or community unit.

== Controversy ==
The development proposal was met with backlash by some members of the community. Since the 1980s, the threat of Thatcher's Housing Act 1980 as well as other neighbouring modern developments such as the City of Edinburgh Council headquarters in 2006 has meant that the historically working-class community is sceptical of modern development.

=== Pre-2008 economic crisis ===
==== Anti-Canongate Organisations ====
As an initial reaction to the proposal in 2005, there were organisations, both newly established and pre-existing, that campaigned as well as made statements or reports against the proposal. Expressed concerns often encompassed the following:

- Aesthetic concerns
- Class-based concerns
- Heritage concerns

===== Save Our Old Town Campaign (SOOT) =====
Also known as the Canongate Community Forum (CCF), SOOT was formed in 2005 as a response to the Caltongate development proposal, after approval from the Scottish Community Action Research Fund (SCARF). The primary aim expressed in their report was their requirement for "genuine community consultation". Notably, The SOOT campaigners used "highly moralised language to challenge Caltongate's supporters and demand their rights to consultation." Programmes were funded by SCARF for public remembrance: walking tours, lectures, films on the history of Canongate, along with public forums where citizens could discover their "intangible heritage".

===== The Cockburn Association =====
The Cockburn Association, an independent charity dedicated to architectural conservation issued a statement addressing their primary concerns. Notably, they criticised:

- The choice of materials, predominantly horizontal roofscapes, demolition of listed buildings, lack of Waverly Valley form and excessively high development.
- The demolition of the Canongate Venture.
- The loss of a panoramic view.
- The lack of attempt to balance the requirements of investors with local and heritage concerns.

===== UNESCO mission 2008 =====
The Edinburgh World Heritage trust lobbied UNESCO in 2008, leading to their sending of a mission to the Caltongate site. In their subsequent report, UNESCO reported that Edinburgh's heritage sites were not in danger and that the World Heritage Committee was concerned about the demolition of the two listed buildings. They also asked for a buffer zone around the World Heritage Site, which has not been taken into action either by the planning committee and Edinburgh World Heritage.

Andrew Holmes, the director of development for the city of Edinburgh Council from the years 2000–2008, criticised UNESCO for its communication only within its "own coterie" via "a self-appointed elite".

===== Historic Scotland =====
Despite expressing earlier concerns over the scheme, Historic Scotland was supportive of the scheme by 2008, under the condition that they would work closely with the developers to ensure that the proposals were sensitive to the historic environment and the World Heritage property.

==== Response to controversy ====
One universal criticism expressed by all organisations was their lack of communication with the local community. In response to this, the council led programmes of community engagement including an invitation-only Planning Stakeholders Workshop in March 2006, preceding an open-door Community Planning Day in April 2006. The Caltongate Liaison Group was also organised by Mountgrange to act as a forum for residents to share their concerns. Mountgrange met with Historic Scotland, Edinburgh World Heritage, Cockburn Association, Old Town Association and Architecture and Design Scotland to discuss the heritage implications of the Caltongate proposals.

This video was also handed out in DVD form to residents and organisations in 2007 to convince them of the benefits of the Caltongate development.

=== Post-2008 economic crisis ===
After Mountgrange went into administration, the construction of Caltongate was paused, which provided a second lease of life to the anti-Caltongate campaign.

==== Post 2008 Anti-Caltongate campaigns ====
By March 2017, 5985 people had signed a petition which had begun in 2014, challenging the council's decision to approve the "Caltongate/New Waverley development". In the spirit of collaboration and innovation, there was even an alternative proposal put forward by ANTA architecture, that kept the interests of "citizens, investors and future occupants" at heart. This employed an aesthetic similar to what is already seen in Edinburgh's Old Town and readopted arcades.

==== UNESCO Decision 2011 ====
After the economic crash, UNESCO issued a new decision, urging the State Party to do all it can to ensure that revised plans are produced for any future development of the Caltongate site that respects the spatial layout of the Old Town.

=== Canongate Venture ===
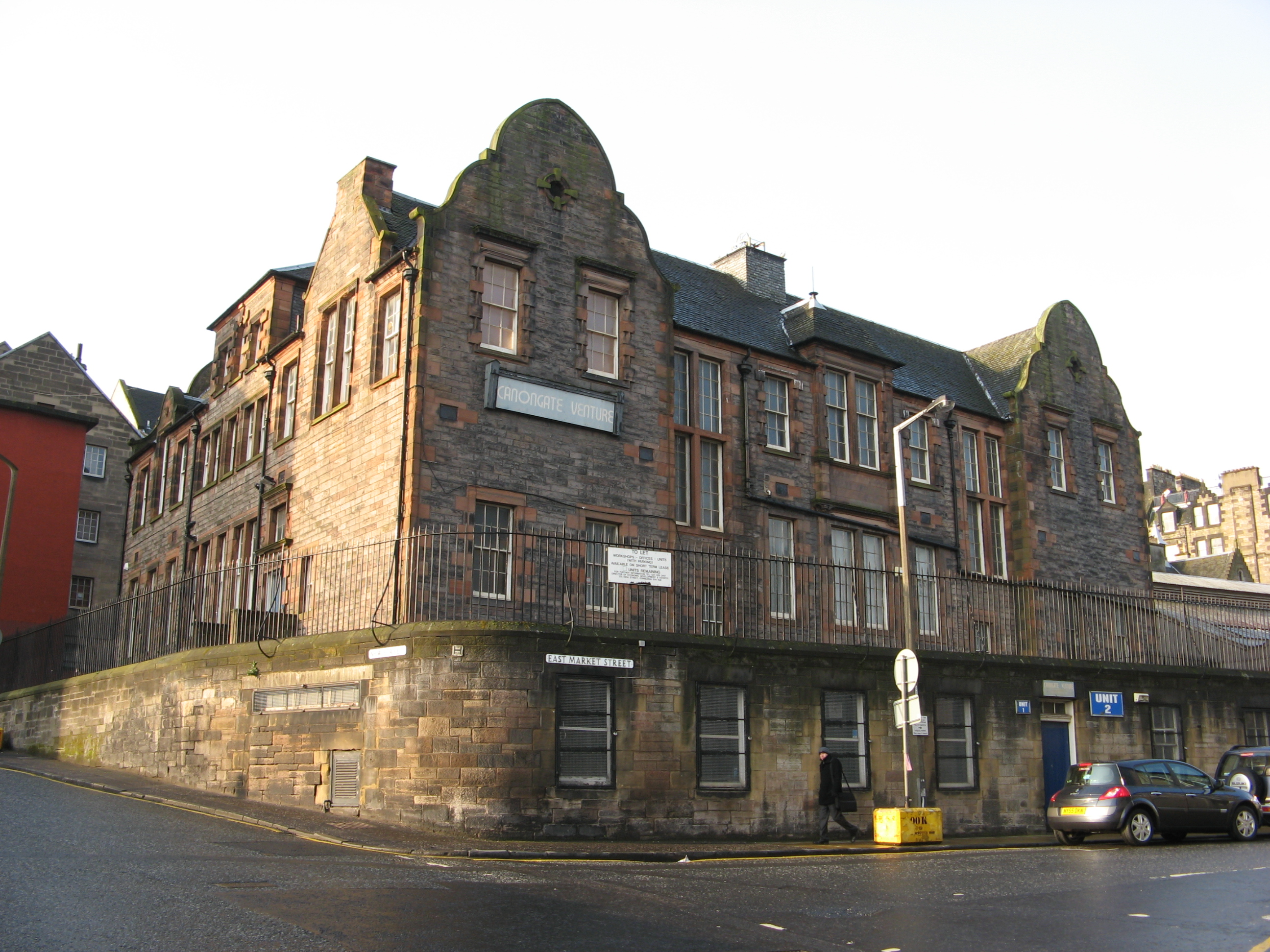
Canongate Venture in 2008

Canongate Venture (North Canongate Infant School) was due to be replaced as part of a hotel and conference centre complex. New research emerged indicating the historical significance of this school in shaping the Children Act 1908 (8 Edw. 7. c. 67). Due to this, there was pressure to keep the building in order to preserve its cultural significance. Sean Bradley, chairman of the Edinburgh Old Town Development Trust, proposed that the building should become a publishing hub combined with a literacy centre. The building was ultimately not demolished and in December 2021, it re-opened as a hotel owned by pub chain BrewDog.

=== The role of class ===
The topic of class also sparked scholarly debate on Caltongate. Scholar Tooley argues that the upper-class heritage supporters fought in the name of 'aesthetic defence', whilst the working-class urban residents fought to keep their area working class. This divide based on class is also seen in the media. In the Scotsman, non-residents are "heavily critical of the design", whilst local residents criticise the "provision for housing".

=== Caltongate proponents ===
Artisan managing director Lukas Nakos said the development marked "a significant milestone in the evolution of one of the most challenging city centre developments anywhere in the UK." Donald Anderson, city council leader from 1999 to 2007, commented that the area had been "intended for regeneration", especially when considering the context of the recently built neighbouring Parliament building.

Councillor Joanna Mowat also famously said that the plans were "not hideous enough to reject." This was a quote used across news articles from various sources to comment on the mood surrounding the Caltongate project.

=== Notable figures ===
Edinburgh Greens councillor Nigel Bagshaw described the development as 'alien' to the character of the Old Town.

A letter was written in March 2014, addressed to readers of The Scotsman by writers Irvine Welsh, Alexander McCall Smith and Janice Galloway, sculptor Alexander Stoddart, artist John Byrne (playwright), and architect James Simpson. This letter criticises the development's "assault on its heritage" and registers "no confidence in the City Planning Department in its current form and membership".

== Design ==
=== Masterplan design ===
The main changes published in Mountgrange's masterplan included:

- A new walkway between Calton Road and Regent Walk called Parliament Way.
- A landmark office block between Jeffrey Street and Cranston Street and a conference centre for Parliament Way.
- Construction of a five star hotel using the Old Sailor's Ark as a façade.
- A major new square Connecting Canongate, East Market Street and Calton Hill.
- Redevelopment of East Market Street and the arches below Jeffrey Street.
- Residential flatted accommodation stretching from Canongate to Calton Road on the Eastern side of the new square.

The masterplan also promised to allocate 25% of its housing options as affordable housing. To substitute the gap left by the demolished New Street bus depot, there was a proposal for a £100,000 arts project to temporarily occupy the given space. This however was never realised.

The exterior of Waverley square features natural sandstone, metal and brick. The design would "create new buildings and spaces of the highest architectural and urban design quality that conserve and reinforce the existing historic and landscape context."

=== Awards ===
The New Waverley (Caltongate) development won three place-making awards in 2017 - including best regeneration project for both the Scottish Property Awards and the Royal Institution of Chartered Surveyors.

=== Criticism ===
The design has been criticised for having adopted "aesthetic governmentality": legitimising social hierarchies and forms of exclusion. Tooley argues that the aesthetic transformation led to 'spatialised forgetting', where the Caltongate communal identity was overridden by a frame of neoliberal urbanism. In other words, the newfound modern aesthetic can be seen as a political attack on a working-class neighbourhood.

The design was also criticised for its modernity, for instance, it was described as a "massive, stale, sterile modernist confection of concrete". which contradicts the historical image of Edinburgh Old Town. As a response, the design features sandstone-coloured cladding, referencing the natural red sandstone prominently found in the architecture of Edinburgh. Anti-Caltongate campaigners also critiqued the design of Caltongate as a direct response to Caltongate leaders' denigration of the neighbourhood's former "dingy" appearance.

=== Sustainability ===
The Caltongate masterplan proposed a ground source heating and cooling system. This would reduce carbon emissions by 30%. Additionally, 30% of materials would be sourced within a 45-mile radius and a Construction Waste Minimisation Plan targeted to divert 80% or more of waste away from ultimate disposal by landfill through promoting the reduction, reuse and recycling of waste.

== Aftermath ==
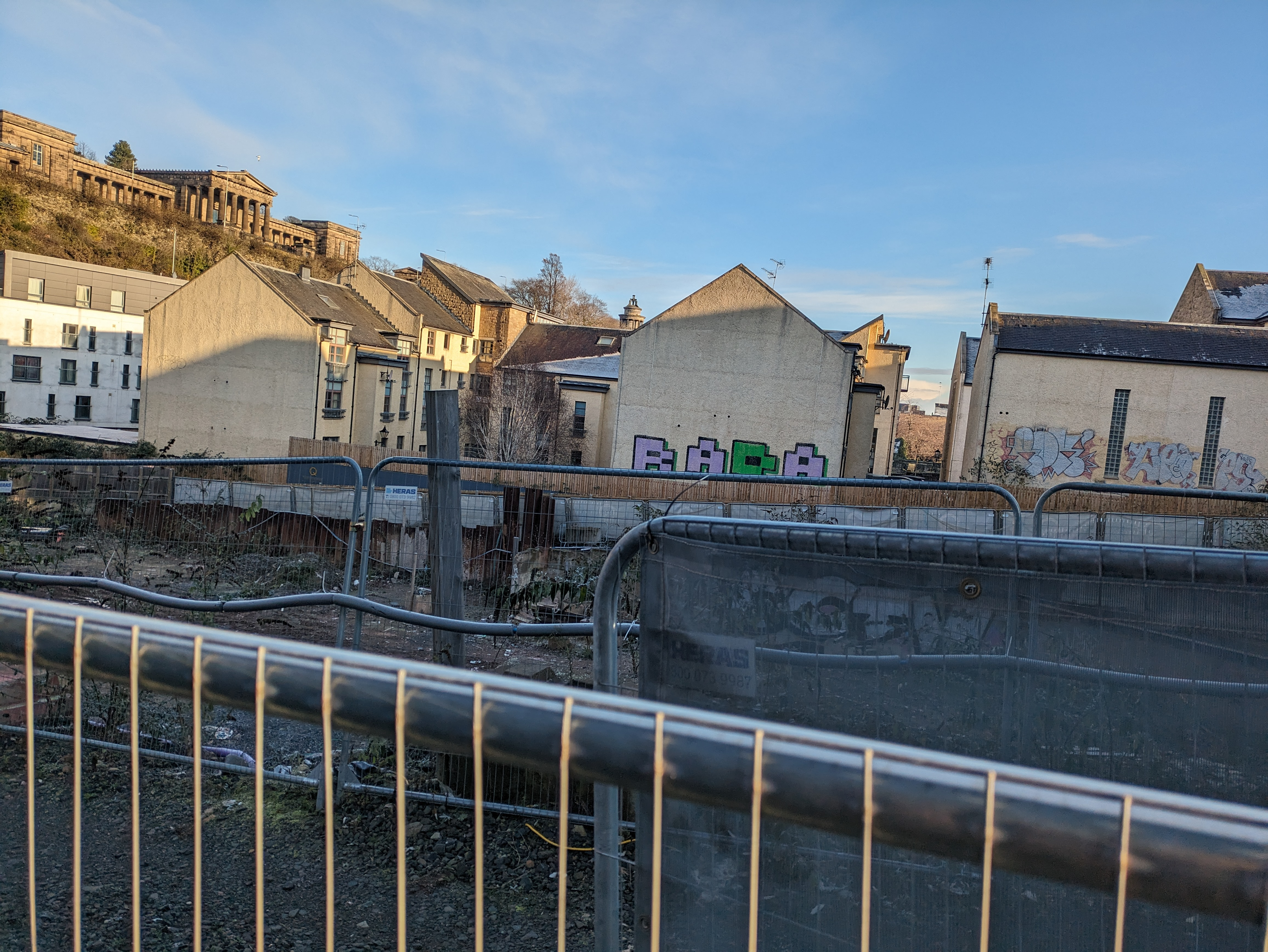
Empty lot of land within the Caltongate development

The Caltongate/New Waverley development moved out existing tenants of Canongate, with the tenements of 221-229 Canongate demolished after 2014. The promised 25% of affordable housing has yet to be built along with the five-star hotel as of 2023. There is an empty lot of land that will supposedly host student accommodation in the future.

Queen Elizabeth House, the Government hub, is said to have moved almost 3000 civil service jobs into New Waverley Square.
