= Robert Inglis (engineer) =

Sir Robert John Mathieson Inglis CIE TD DL FRSE (1881–1962) was a Scots-born railway engineer noted for his work in Britain and India and his reorganisation of the railways in post-war Germany.

== Life ==
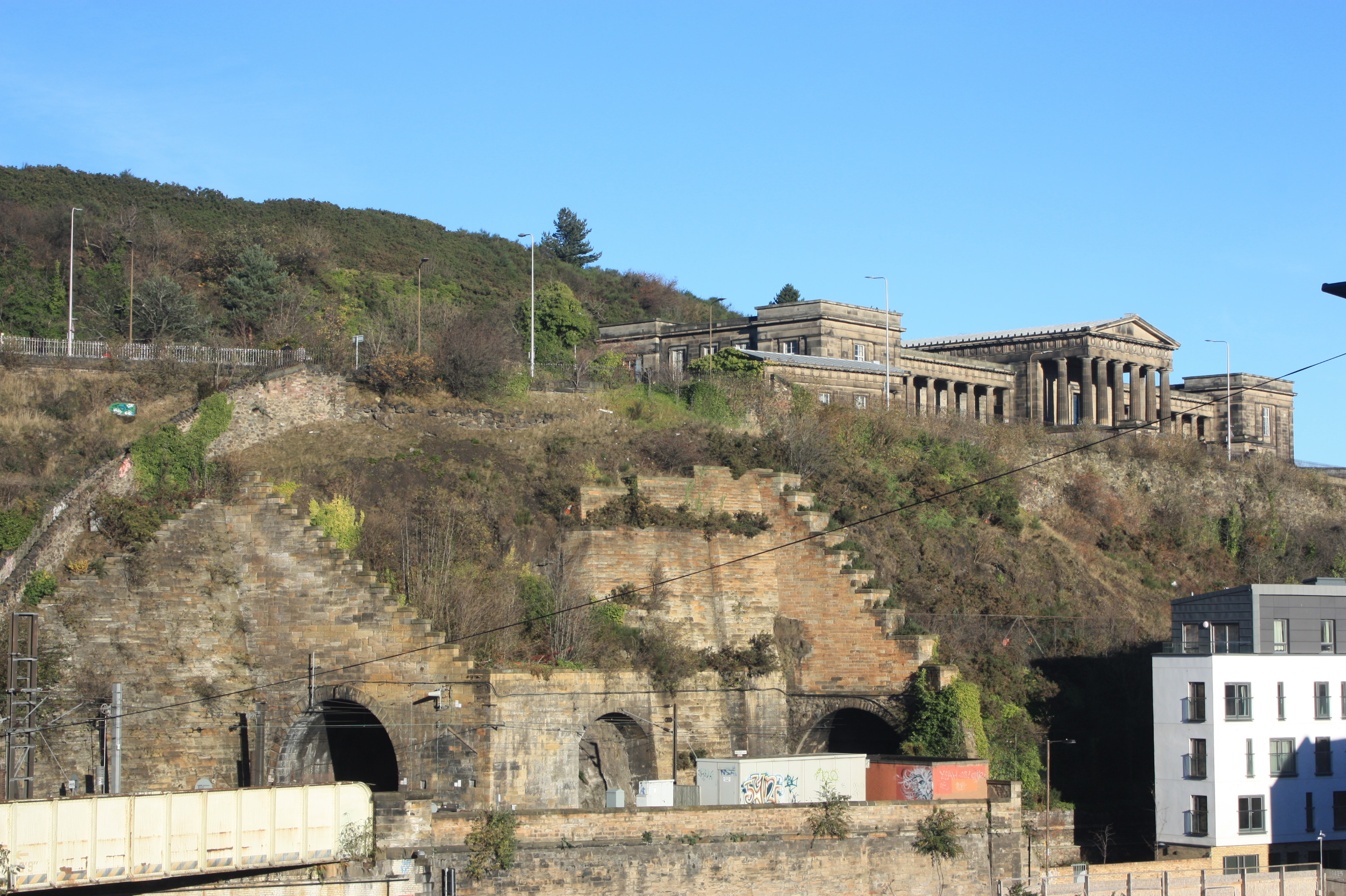
Inglis's railway tunnels under Calton Hill and the Royal High School, Edinburgh

He was born at Tantah House in south Peebles on 5 May 1881, the son of James C. Inglis of Biggar Lanarkshire Scotland and Tantah (Peebles). He was educated locally at Bonnington Park Academy then went to Edinburgh University to study Mathematics and Engineering.

In 1900 he joined the North British Railway as a junior design engineer. He quickly rose to be Resident Engineer for the Lothian area and was involved in the widening works between Edinburgh and Portobello (including a reconfiguration of the tunnels going through Calton Hill under the Royal High School. In 1909 he became Chief Assistant for New Works for all of the North British Railway, aged only 28. In 1911 he received yet another boost to his blooming career, being appointed an Engineer to the Ministry of Transport for Great Britain.

In 1912 he was elected a Fellow of the Royal Society of Edinburgh. His proposers were Sir Thomas Hudson Beare, Willam Archer Porter Tait, Benjamin Hall Blyth, Charles Alexander Stevenson and William Allan Carter.

In 1919 he became Deputy Chief Engineer of Railways and in 1921 Chief Engineer of Railways. During this period he also acted as District engineer for the Glasgow area. In 1929 he went to work for London and North Eastern Railway as Assistant Engineer. In 1937 he became Engineer in charge of the Southern Area, succeeding fellow Scot, Charles John Brown. In 1943 he became Divisional General Manager of the Scottish Area for LNER – more of an administrative role. He left this to take on a more challenging role in India doing a special report to the Indian Government on necessary improvements needed to the largely 19th century system. For this work he was created a Companion of the Order of the Indian Empire (CIE).

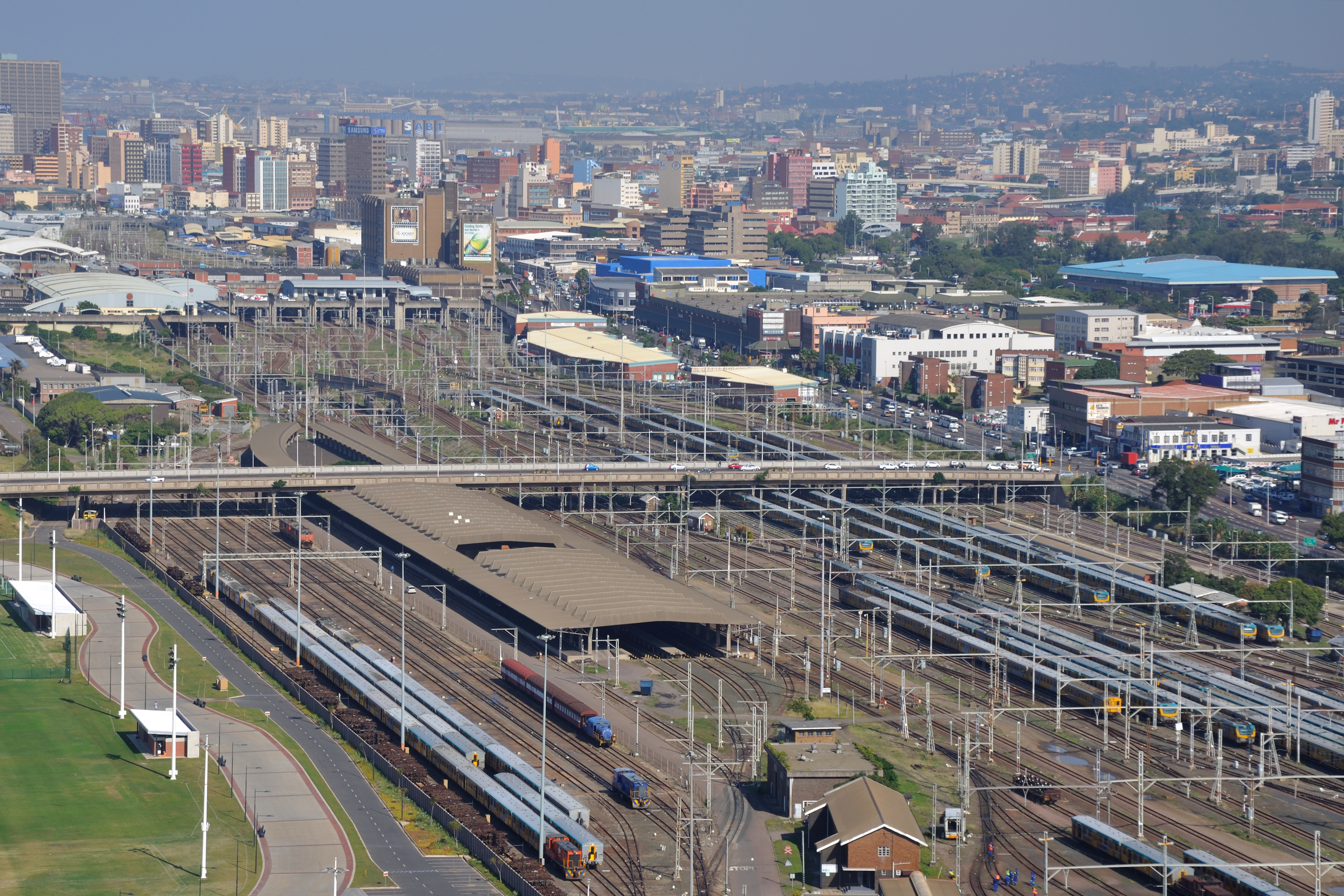
Durban railway station

His most curious role (arguably) was in post-war Germany from 1945. Here he advised the authorities within the British Section on the degree to which the lines and systems could be stripped down and still remain operational. This involved the removal of thousands of miles of "duplicate tracks" reducing many lines to a one-way system, but rarely wholly removing any route. In this task it can perhaps be seen as a precursor to the Beeching cuts in Britain. Surplus steel was sold off as "reparition". Inglis began as Chief of Transport for the British Sector and rose to Chief of Transport for both the British and American Sectors. On a more positive note, this also included major improvements to tram systems within multiple West German cities. He was knighted by King George VI in 1947 for his works.

In 1948 he went to South Africa to advise upon and establish the new Durban railway station. In 1949 he returned to Scotland as Chairman of the Glasgow and District Transport Committee with the primary purpose of electrifying the Glasgow and Clyde Valley railway system, publishing what became known in the railway industry as the Inglis Report in 1951.

In 1954/5 he was Chairman of the investigating committee on Rhodesian Railways again looking at efficiency.

He retired to Helensburgh in 1957 aged 76, but took on the titular role of Deputy Lieutenant for Dunbartonshire.

He died in Helensburgh on 23 June 1962.

== Family ==
In 1923 he married Barbara Selkirk Sommerville, later becoming Lady Inglis. They had one son and one daughter.
