= Calton Hill =

Hill in central Edinburgh, Scotland

- Caltoun, Caldtoun
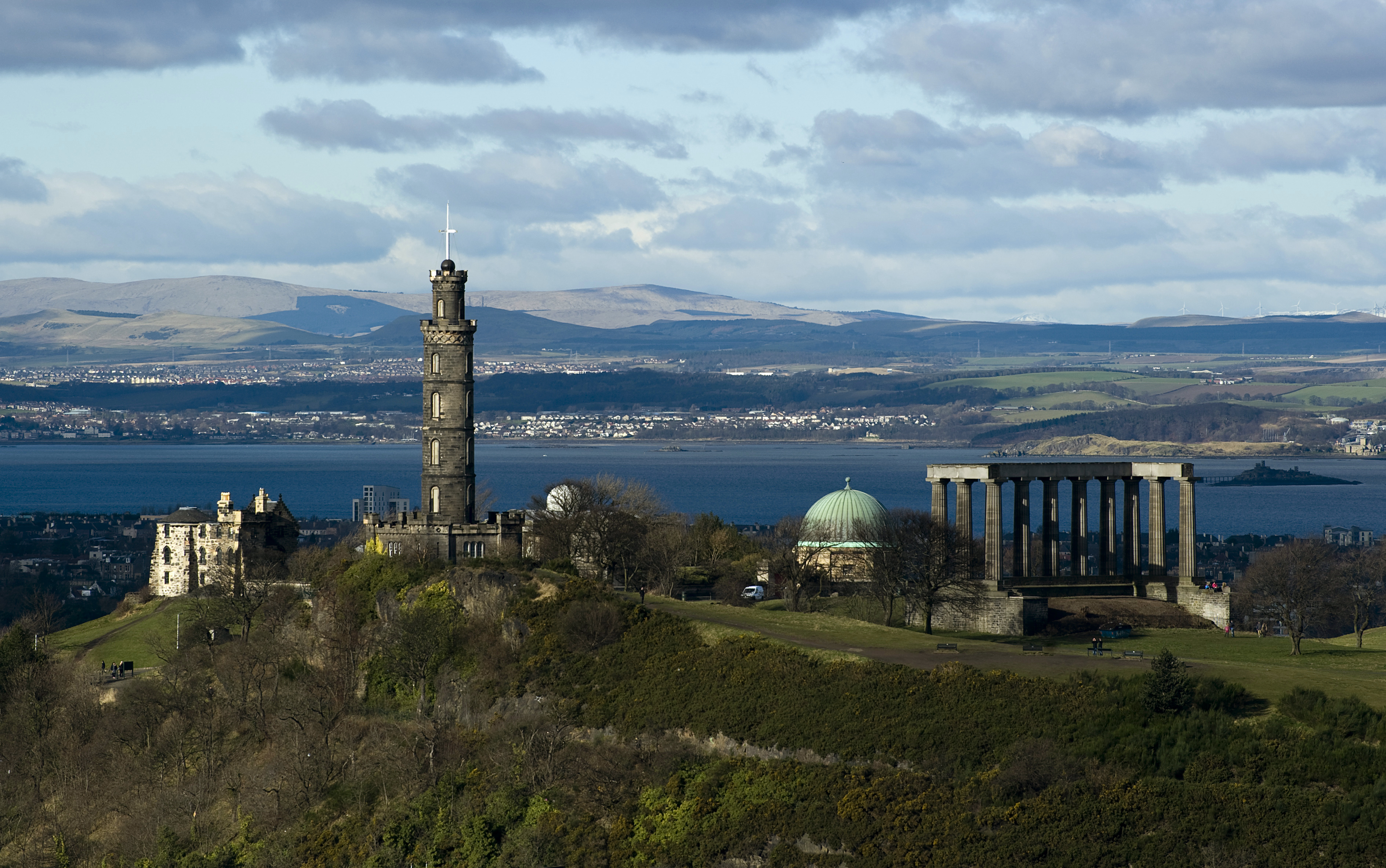
- A view of Calton Hill with some of its many monuments, seen from the Salisbury Crags

Highest point
- Elevation: 103 m (338 ft)
- Prominence: 46 m (151 ft)
- Isolation: 0.99 km (0.62 mi)
- Coordinates: 55°57′19″N 03°10′56″W

Naming
- Native name: Scottish Gaelic: Cnoc Coilltinn

Geography
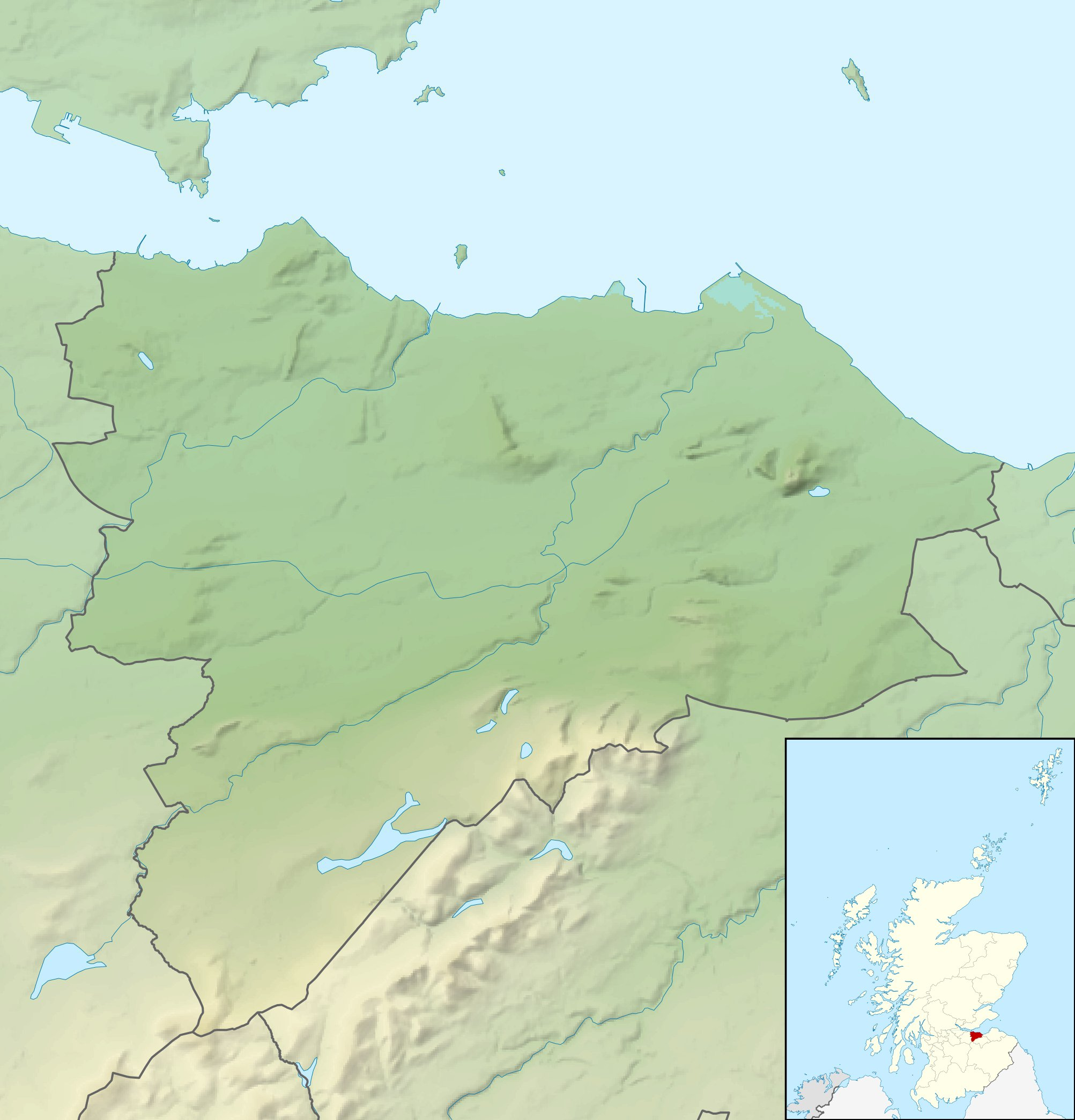
- Location within Edinburgh Location within the City of Edinburgh council area Location within Scotland

Calton Hill (/ˈkɔːltən/; Scottish Gaelic: Cnoc Coilltinn) is a hill in central Edinburgh, Scotland, situated beyond the east end of Princes Street and included in the city's UNESCO World Heritage Site. Views of, and from, the hill are often used in photographs and paintings of the city.

Calton Hill is the headquarters of the Scottish Government, which is based at St Andrew's House, on the steep southern slope of the hill. The Scottish Parliament Building and other prominent buildings such as Holyrood Palace lie near the foot of the hill. Calton Hill is also the location of several monuments and buildings: the National Monument, the Nelson Monument, the Dugald Stewart Monument, the old Royal High School, the Robert Burns Monument, the Political Martyrs' Monument and the City Observatory.

The area lies between the Edinburgh districts of Greenside and Abbeyhill.

== Etymology ==
In 1456, James II granted land to Edinburgh by charter wherein Calton Hill is referred to as "Cragingalt", the name by which it appears on the 1560 Petworth map of the Siege of Leith (rendered as "Cragge Ingalt"). The name may have derived from Old Welsh meaning "crag on the hill" or "wooded hillside".

The name might come from the Brittonic *Celdi (a small wood or holt) and the locative *-in (at), so it means “place of the small wood” and is equivalent to Gaelic “Coilltinn”.

The records of South Leith Parish Church name "Caldtoun" as one of the quarters of the parish in 1591, though the village and area are otherwise generally referred to as "Craigend", signifying the main land form (crags) at the western end of the feudal barony of Restalrig, as opposed to the distinguishing feature at its eastern end, a loch, hence the name Lochend. The name "Caldtoun" (sometimes anglicised as "Cold town") remained general until about 1700, the names Calton and Caltonhill first appearing when Wester Restalrig was sold to Edinburgh in 1725. The Armstrongs' map of the Three Lothians (1773) still uses the name "Caldtoun" and Ainslie's maps of Edinburgh record a change in spelling from Caltoun to Calton between 1780 and 1804.

== History ==
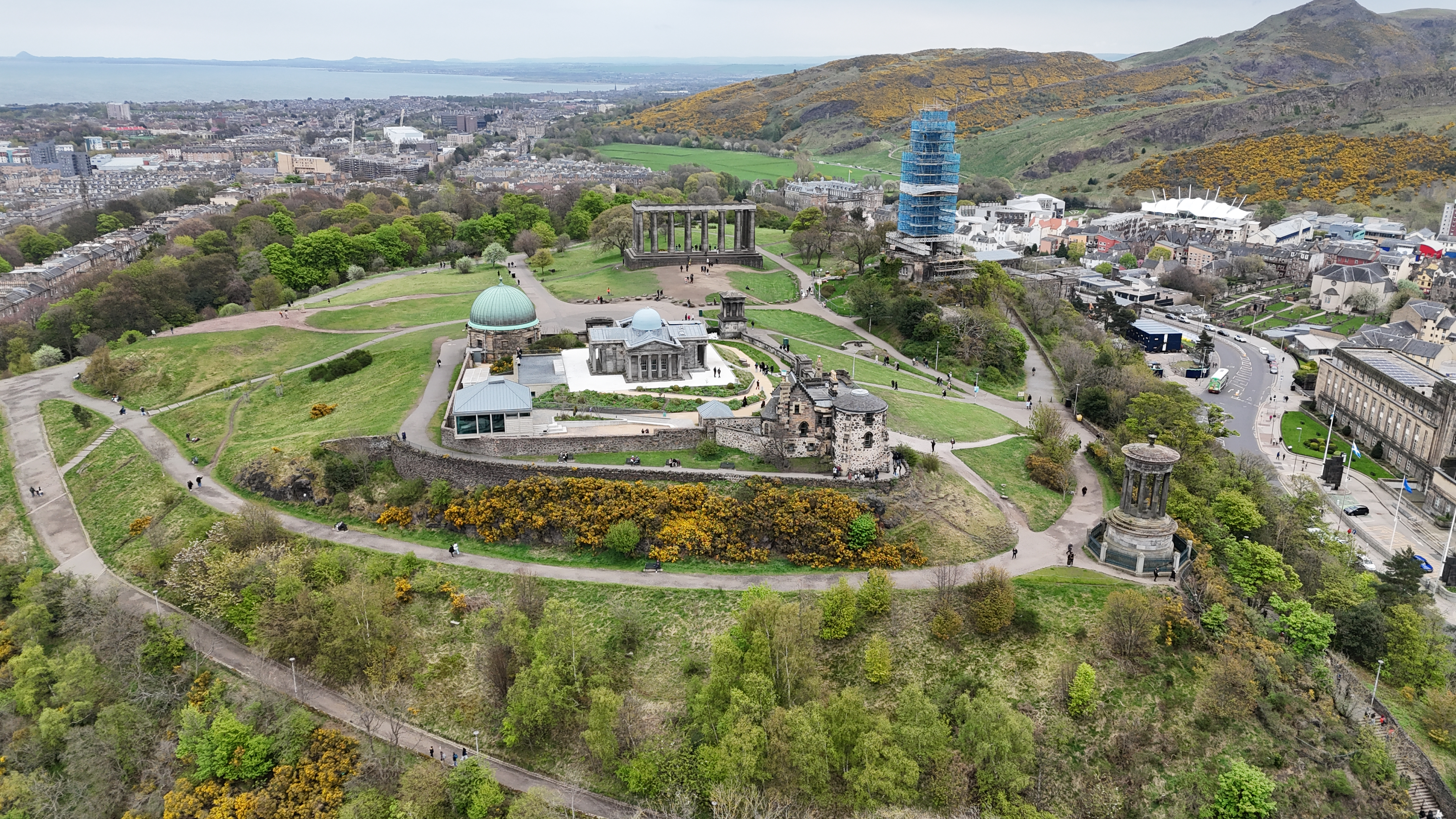
An aerial view of Calton Hill

There was possibly a prehistoric hillfort on Calton Hill and an area used for quarrying (the Quarry Holes at the eastern end). By his charter of 1456, James II granted the community of Edinburgh the valley and the low ground between Calton Hill and Greenside for performing tournaments, sports and other warlike deeds. This was part of his policy of military preparedness that saw the Act of 1457 banning golf and football and ordering archery practice every Sunday. This natural amphitheatre was also used for open-air theatre and saw performances of the early Scots play A Satire of the Three Estates by David Lyndsay. In May 1518 the Carmelite Friars (also known as White Friars and locally based at South Queensferry), were granted lands by charter from the city at Greenside and built a small monastery there.

In November 1559, during the Siege of Leith, the Lords of the Congregation brought two guns to "Craigingalt" and began to bombard Leith. The French made a sortie and captured one cannon and the other was destroyed. Monasteries were abandoned following the Scottish Reformation of 1560, and in 1591 the Calton Hill monastery was converted into a hospital for lepers, founded by John Robertson, a merchant. So severe were the regulations that escape, or even the opening of the gate of the hospital between sunset and sunrise, would incur the penalty of death carried out on the gallows erected at the gate. The monastery would appear to have been located at the north-east end of Greenside Row and its site is shown there on the 1931 Ordnance Survey maps. Ten skeletons found in July 2009 during roadworks to create a new tramway in Leith Walk (project cancelled from York Place to Leith but revived and completed in 2023), are believed to have been connected with the hospital.

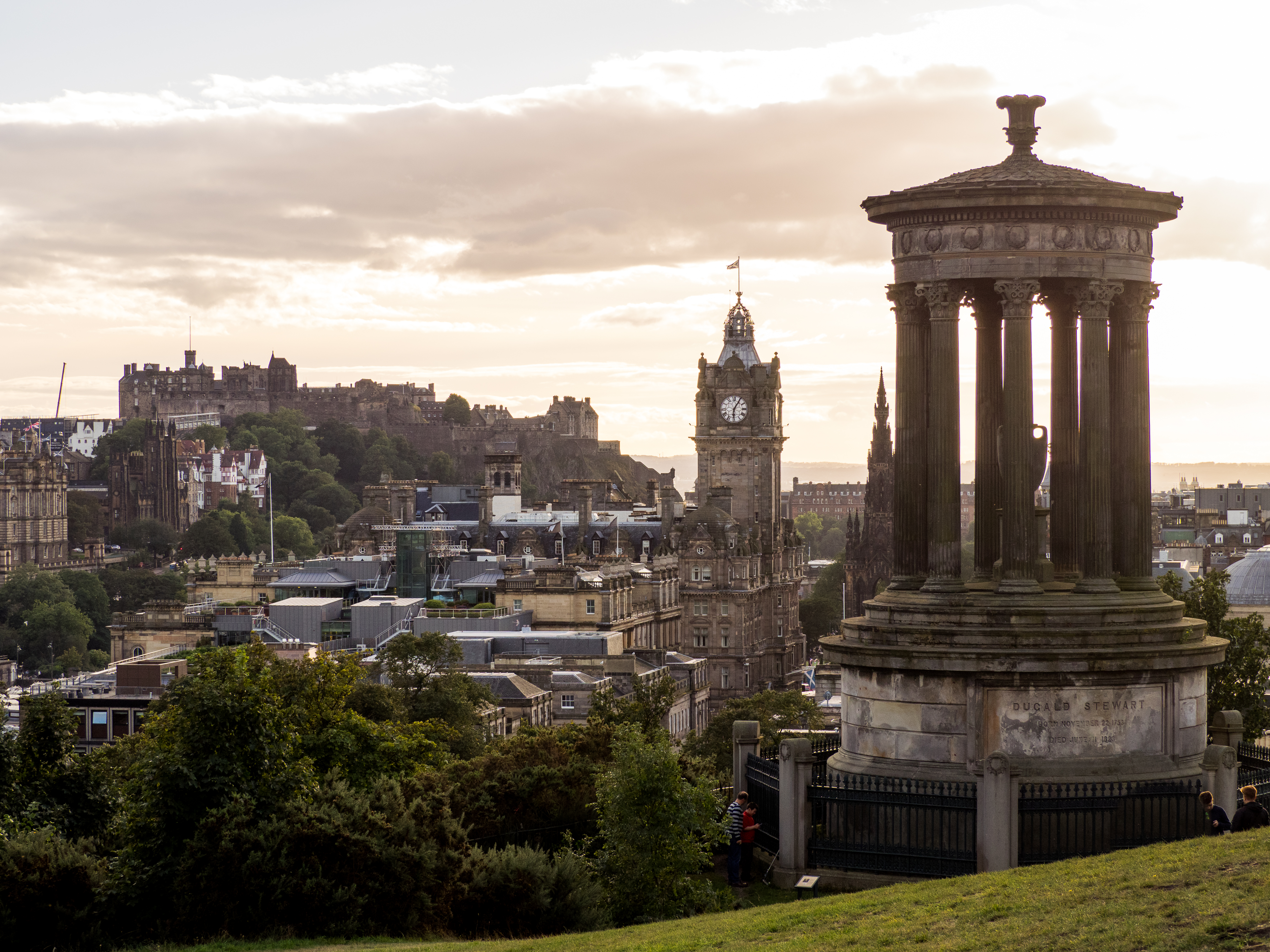
View over Edinburgh, with the Dugald Stewart Monument in the foreground

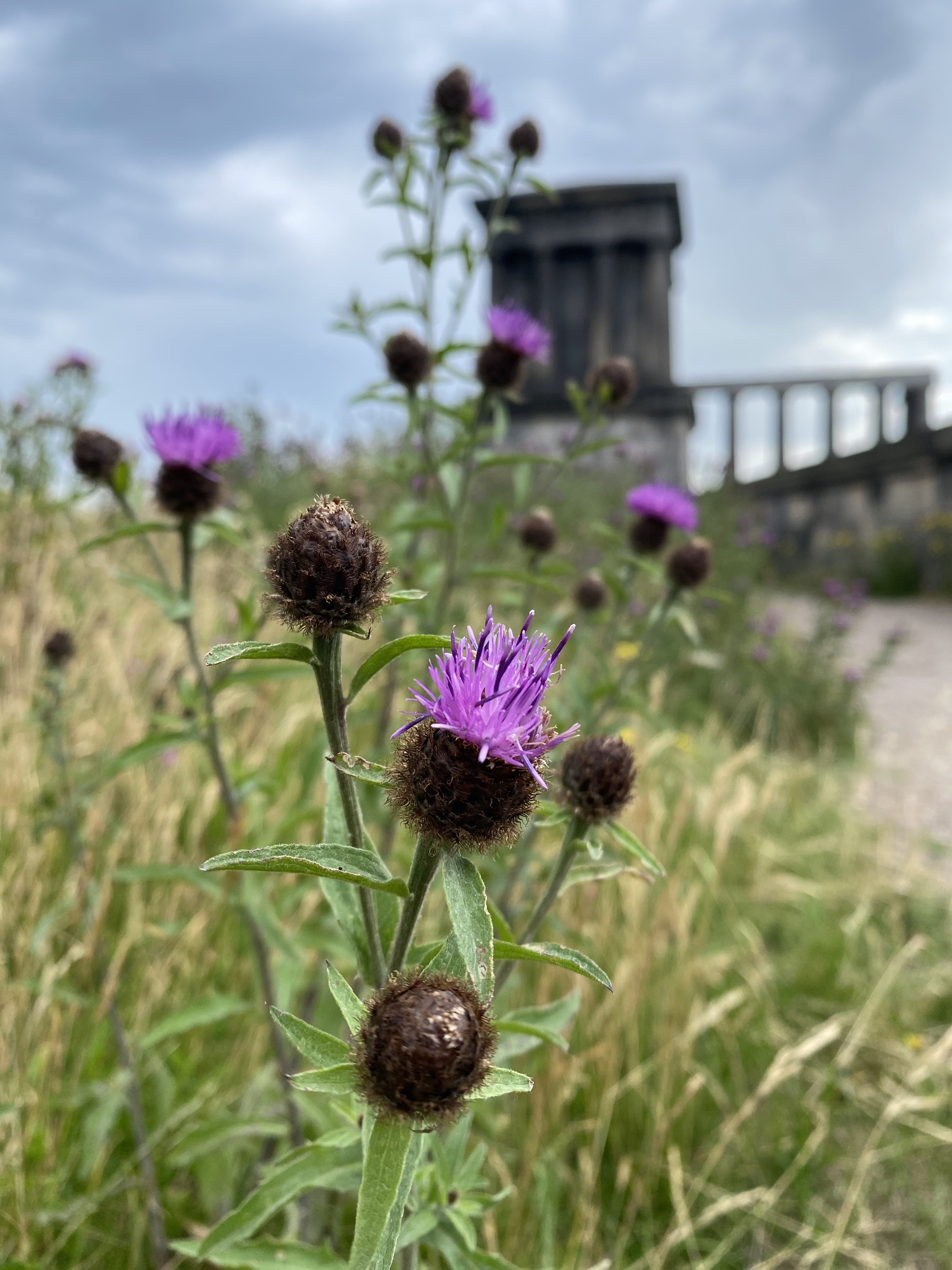
Common Knapweed on Calton Hill in central Edinburgh, Scotland, 2023

The Calton area was owned by the Logan family of Restalrig but their lands were forfeited in 1609 following the posthumous sentence of treason on Robert Logan. The lands of Restalrig and Calton, otherwise known as Easter and Wester Restalrig, passed to the Elphinstone family. James Elphinstone was made Lord Balmerino in 1604 and in 1673 the lands of Restalrig and Calton were erected into a single barony. In 1725, the western side of Calton Hill was sold to the royal burgh of Edinburgh. The eastern end was owned by the charitable institution of Heriot's Trust. Calton remained a burgh of barony (although it was not administered as such) until it was formally incorporated into Edinburgh by the Municipality Extension Act of 1856.

In 1631, the then Lord Balmerino granted a charter to The Society of the Incorporated Trades of Calton forming a society or corporation. This also gave the Society the exclusive right to trade within Calton and the right to tax others who wished to do so. Normally the trades of burghs were separately incorporated, for example in the Canongate there were eight incorporations, but the Incorporated Trades of Calton allowed any tradesman to become a member providing they were healthy and their work was of an acceptable standard. This lack of restrictive practices allowed a thriving trade to develop.

The village of Calton was situated at the bottom of the ravine at the western end of Calton Hill (hence its earlier name of Craigend), on the road from Leith Wynd in Edinburgh and North Back of the Canongate to Leith Walk and also to Broughton and thence the Western Road to Leith. In the village, the street was variously known as St. Ninian's Row or Low Calton. Many of the old buildings here were demolished at the time of the Waterloo Place and Regent Bridge development, which bridged the ravine, from 1816. The remaining old village houses of the Low Calton were removed in the 1970s.

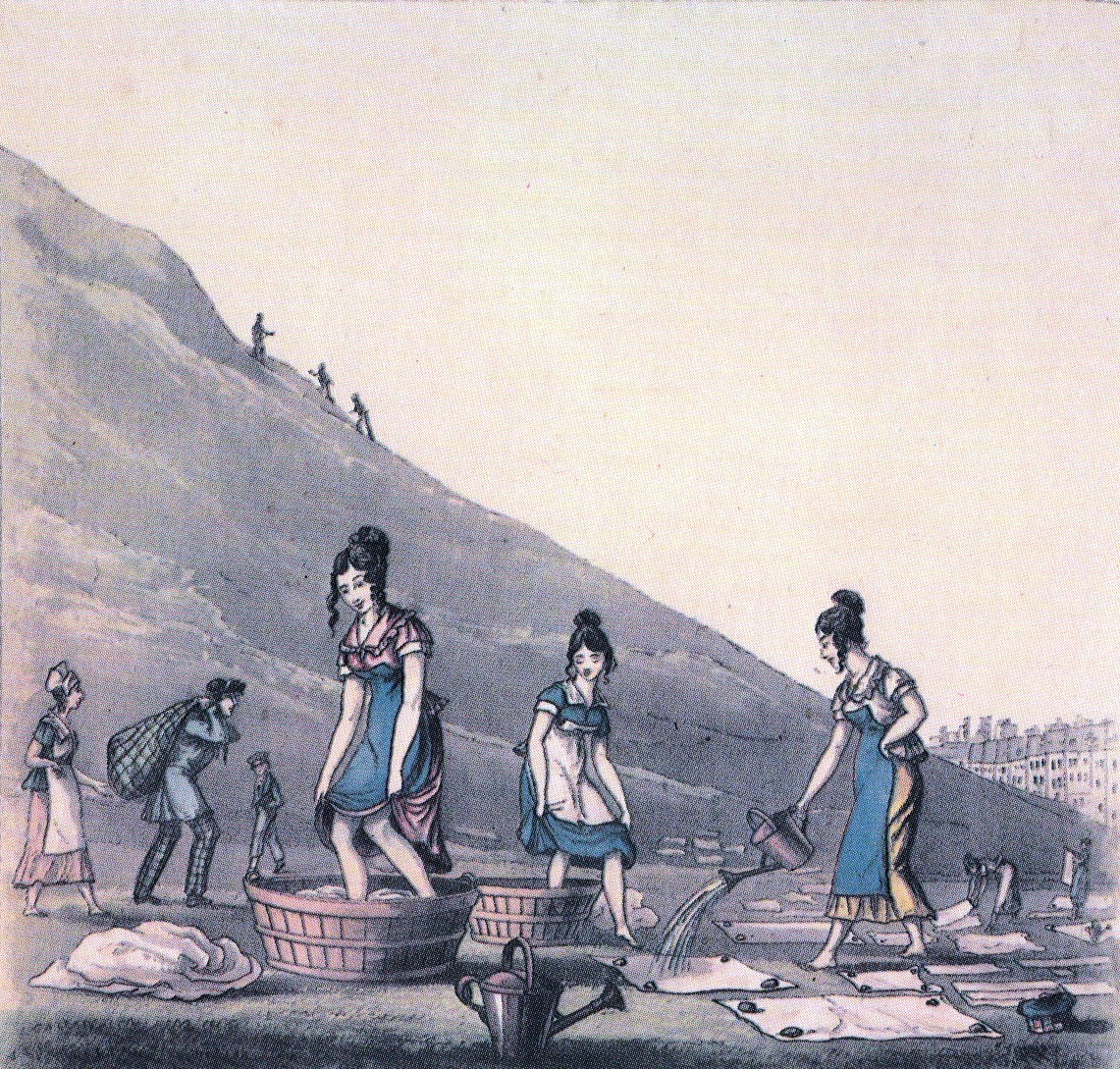
Washerwomen on Calton Hill (1825)

Although located near Edinburgh, Calton was in South Leith Parish and its inhabitants went to church in Leith and were buried in the churchyard there. As the village developed, it became more convenient to have burials nearby and, in 1718, the Society bought a half acre of land at a cost of £1013 from Lord Balmerino for use as a burial ground. This became known as Old Calton Burial Ground. Permission was granted for an access road, originally known as High Calton and now the street called Calton Hill, up the steep hill from the village to the burial ground. The group of 1760s houses near the top of this street are all that remain of the old village.

In 1787, the artist Robert Barker, inspired by walking on the hill, created the world's first panorama - an immersive 360 degree view depicting Edinburgh from the tower of the City Observatory at the summit of Calton Hill.

== Buildings and structures ==
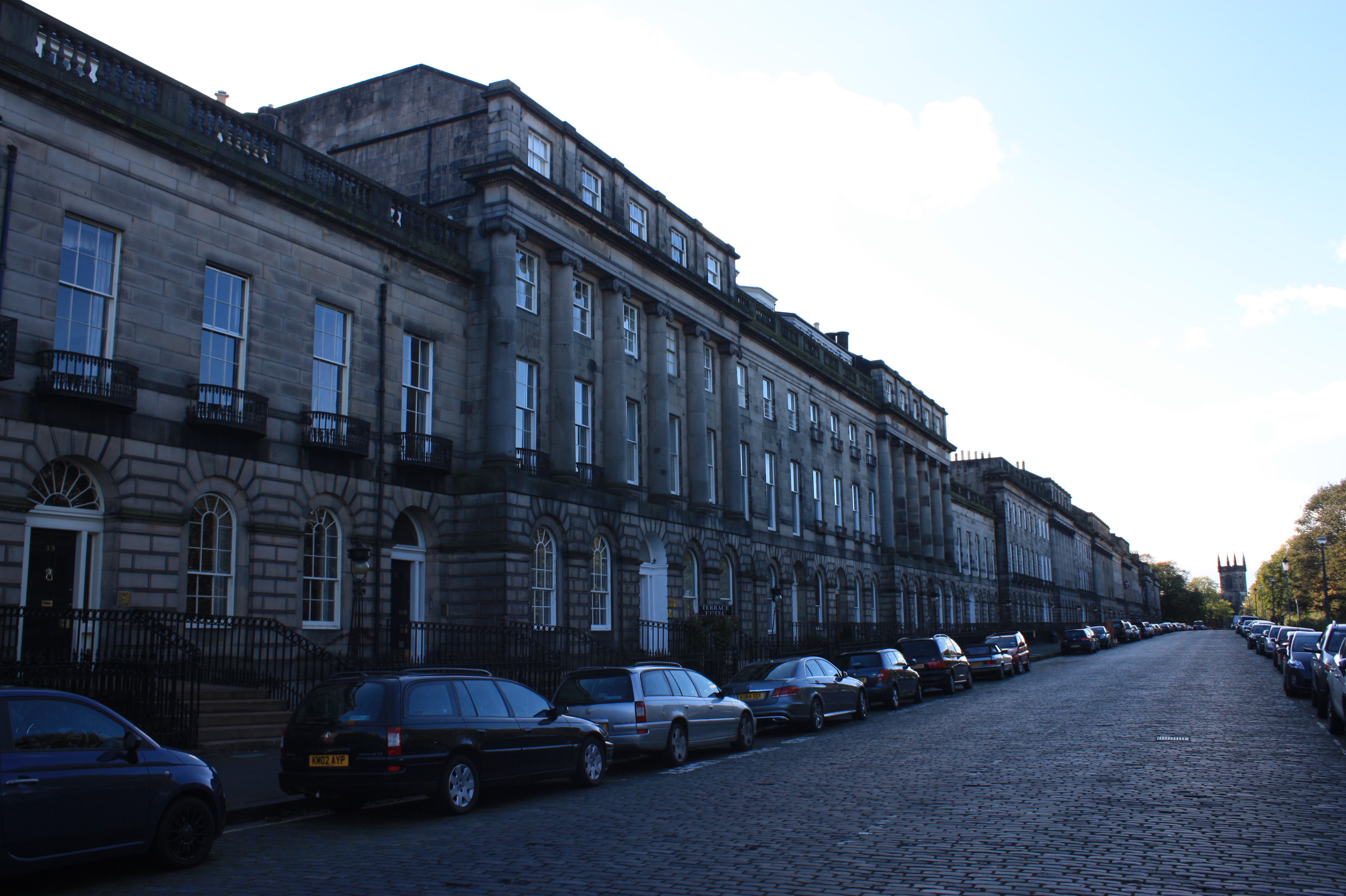
Royal Terrace, Edinburgh

The Old Calton Burial Ground was the first substantial development on Calton Hill and lies on the south-western side of the hill. The philosopher David Hume is buried there. His tomb is engraved only with the year of his birth (1711) and death (1776), on the "simple Roman tomb" (a relatively large monument) which he prescribed. The Political Martyrs' Monument is also in the burial ground. This is in memory of five campaigners for political reform and universal suffrage who were convicted of sedition and sent in 1793 to Botany Bay, Australia.

On the west side of Calton Hill is the street named Calton Hill. Agnes Maclehose, better known as Robert Burns' Clarinda, lived at number 14 and died there in 1841. Burns, Scotland's national poet, sent Clarinda many verses over several years in unsuccessful (it is believed) attempts to seduce this beautiful married lady. Series 6 of the BBC Television series A House Through Time, shown in 2026, describes the history and inhabitants of a five-story building at 20/22 Calton Hill.

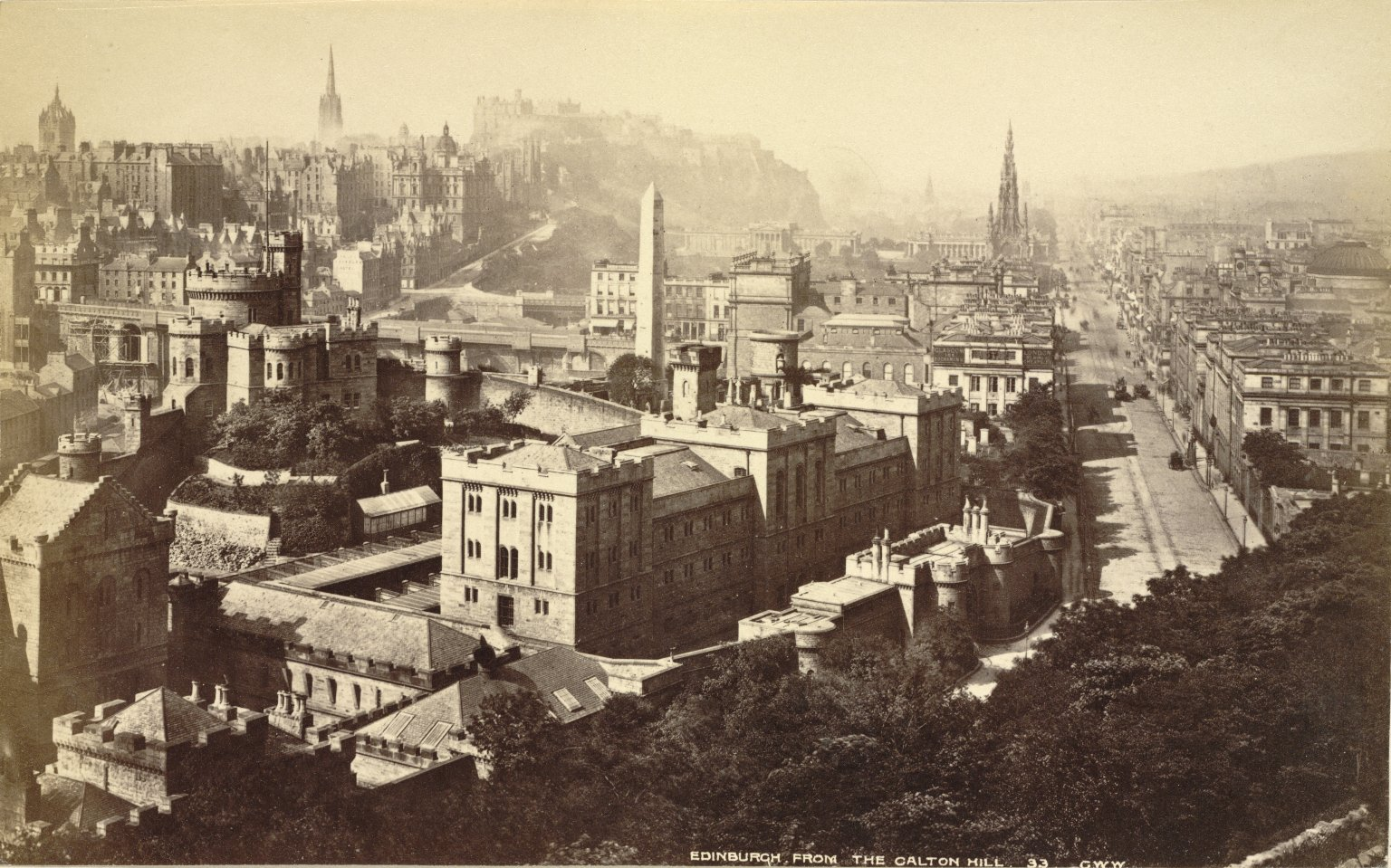
Edinburgh from the Calton Hill with Calton Jail in foreground, by George Washington Wilson, albumen print, ca. 1865-1895

Calton Hill was the location of the notorious Calton Jail, a complex comprising a Debtors' Prison, the Bridewell (1791–96) by Robert Adam (later replaced) and a Felons' Prison of 1815-17 by Archibald Elliot. The prisons were replaced by Saughton Prison and demolished in 1930 providing a site for St. Andrew's House, home to Scotland's senior civil servants. The sole surviving building is the castellated and turreted Governor's House by Elliot. The lower curtain walls of the prison are still visible on the south side of St. Andrew's House, above Calton Road.

The eastern end of the ornate Regent Bridge is built into the side of the hill, crossing a deep gorge (at the bottom of which the opening scene from Trainspotting was shot) to connect the hill with Princes Street, now Edinburgh's main shopping street. The engineer in charge of building Regent Bridge in 1815 was Robert Stevenson, grandfather of the author Robert Louis Stevenson.

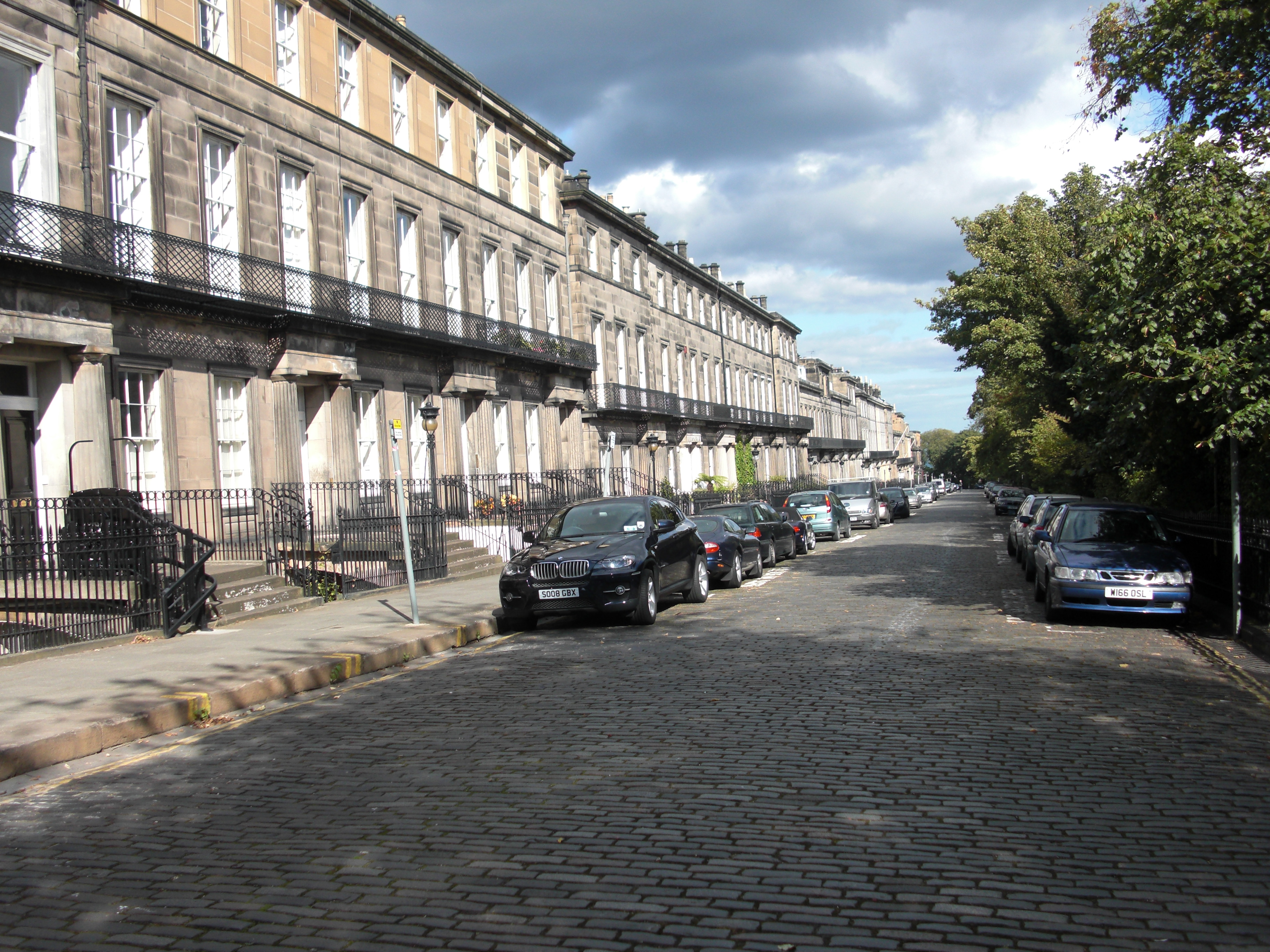
Regent Terrace, part of the Calton extension to Edinburgh's Georgian New Town.

The renowned Scottish architect William Henry Playfair was responsible for the elegant thoroughfare that encircles the hill on three sides. Comprising Royal Terrace, Carlton Terrace and Regent Terrace, the largest of the townhouses can be found on Royal Terrace. Playfair's plan is dated 1819 and the first house was built at what is now 40 Royal Terrace. Regent Gardens that cover over one half of the summit of the hill are privately administered by a local association. Carlton Terrace was originally called Carlton (or Carleton) Place but changed in 1842 to fit in with the other Terraces.

Most of the properties on the terraces are occupied as houses but on Royal Terrace there is a number of hotels, by far the largest being the Crowne Plaza Hotel while on Regent Terrace is located the United States Consulate. Royal Terrace with its views over Leith and the Firth of Forth was popular with early owners who were shipowners and traders in Leith. Some of these were involved in the whisky trade, Leith being a centre for whisky blending and storage, and for a time in the 19th century the street was known as Whisky Row.

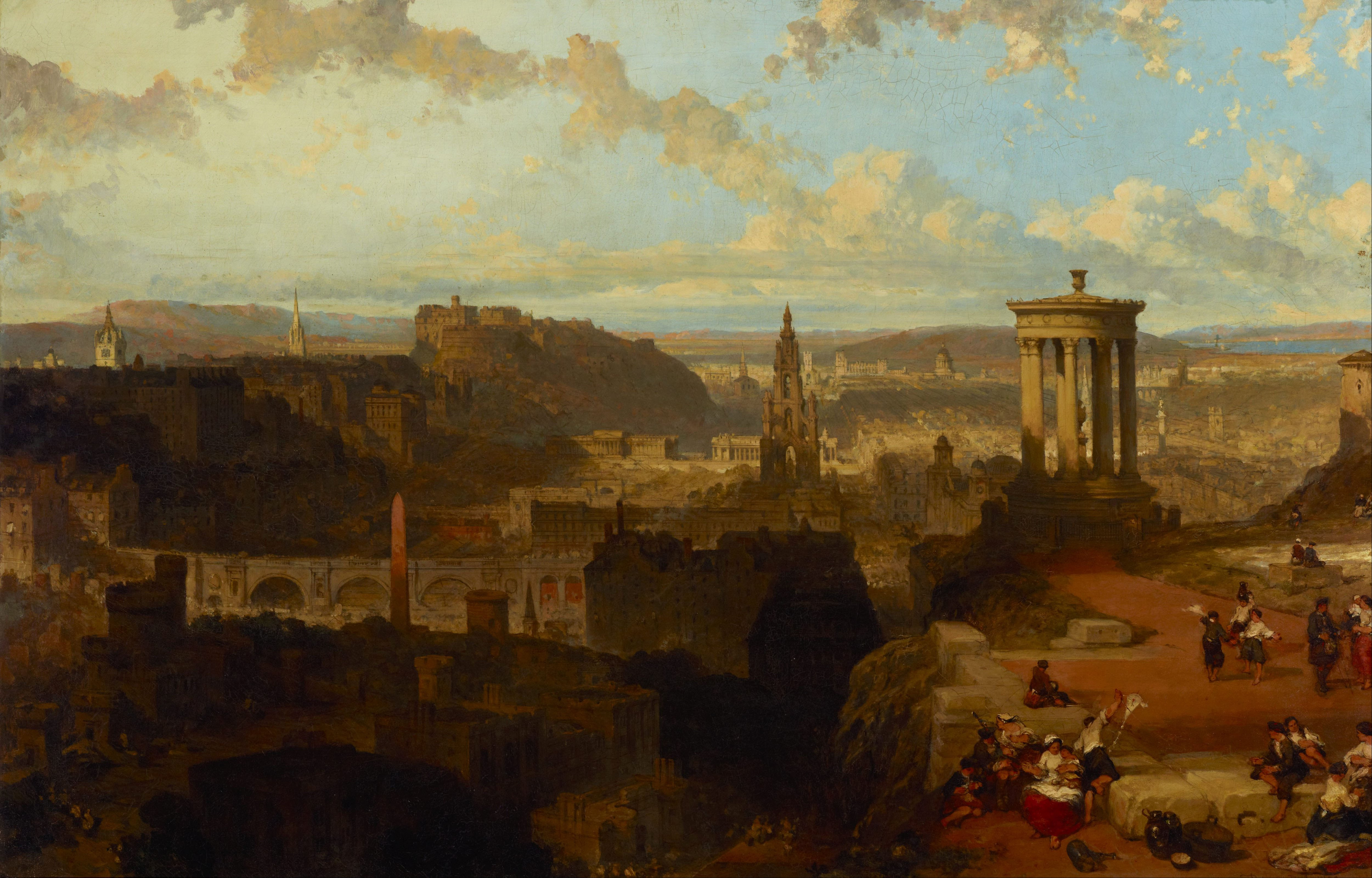
Edinburgh from the Calton Hill by David Roberts, 1858

Louis-Antoine, Duke of Angoulême (the elder son of Charles X of France, last of the Bourbon kings) and his wife Marie Thérèse of France, (the daughter of Louis XVI and Marie Antoinette), moved into what is now 22 (then 21) Regent Terrace in 1830. Marie-Caroline de Bourbon-Sicile, duchess de Berry, sister in law of the Duc d'Angoulême, also lived at what is now 12 (then 11) Regent Terrace at that time. Her young son, Henri, the Comte de Chambord, is said to have wept bitterly when his family left for Austria in 1832 as he had become very attached to Scotland. The painter Francis Cadell, one of the Scottish Colourists, lived in 30 Regent Terrace from 1930-1935. The western end of Regent Terrace was closed in 2001 to traffic because of security concerns about the United States Consulate.

Playfair was responsible for many of the monumental structures on the summit of the hill, most notably the Scottish National Monument. This monument was intended to be an replica of the Parthenon and to commemorate Scottish Soldiers killed in the Napoleonic Wars. Construction started in 1826 but work was stopped in 1829 when the building was only partially built due to lack of money. It has never been completed. For many years this failure to complete led to its being nicknamed "Edinburgh's Disgrace" or "Scotland's Disgrace" but these names have waned given the time elapsed since the Napoleonic Wars and it is now accepted for what it is.

The Royal High School was built on the southern slopes in 1829, forming a part of Edinburgh's skyline. In the 1840s a tunnel was added through the lower south side of the hill (under the High School) taking tracks eastward from the newly built Waverley Station. The west end of the tunnel was remodelled and a second tunnel built in 1902 by Robert Inglis.

"Rock House" (28 Calton Hill), which overlooks Waterloo Place at the south-western entrance to the hill, was the home of Robert Adamson who in partnership with David Octavius Hill pioneered the calotype process of photography in Scotland in the 1840s. Many of their subjects were photographed in the house and its garden.

At the foot of the access steps from Regent Road is a memorial to three 19th-century Scottish singers, John Wilson (1800–1849), John Templeton (1802–1886), and David Kennedy (1825–1886). The monument was sculpted by William Grant Stevenson.

By the 1840s, a pipeline ran over the shoulder of Calton Hill from the Edinburgh coal gas works in the Canongate between New Street and Tolbooth Wynd to the Bonnington Chemical Works in Bonnington. The gasworks waste was pumped through the line and processed into useful products at Bonnington.

== Political symbol ==
For a number of years, while the Royal High School was earmarked for the site of the future Scottish Assembly, and subsequently as a potential site for the Scottish Parliament, Calton Hill was the location of a permanent vigil for Scottish devolution. However, Donald Dewar, then Secretary of State for Scotland, considered the site a "nationalist shibboleth".

== Events ==
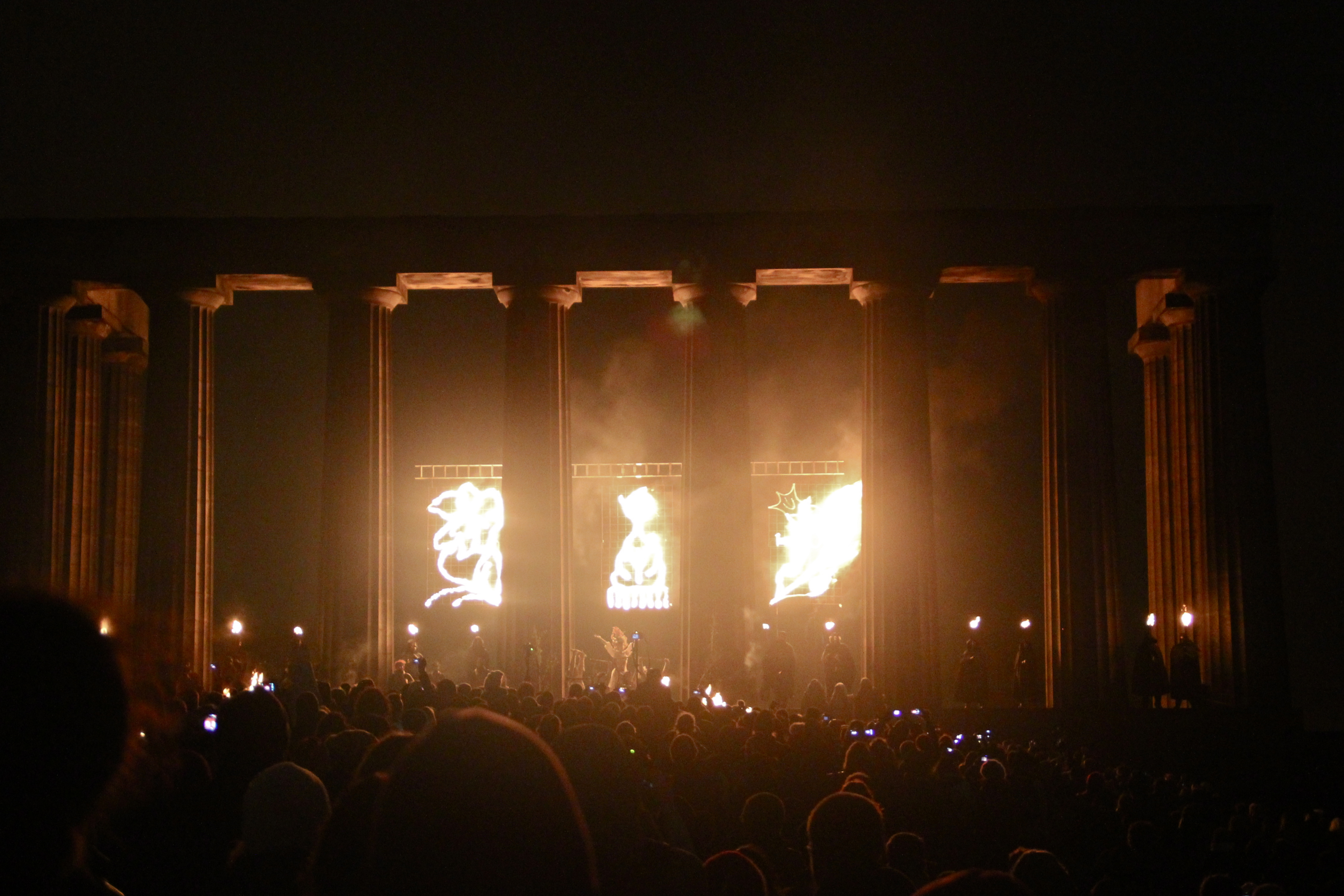
The National Monument during the Beltane Fire Festival

Calton Hill is the venue for a number of events throughout the year. The largest of these is the Beltane Fire Festival held on 30 April each year, attended by over 12,000 people. The Dussehra Hindu Festival also takes place on Calton Hill near the beginning of October each year and the Samhuinn Fire festival takes place at the end of October.

Calton Hill has been used as a location for films such as Sunshine on Leith (where Davy and Yvonne sing Misty Blue), Death Defying Acts (Houdini) and Greyfriars Bobby (views across the city).

== Illegal activities ==
Calton Hill has been the focus of considerable police and local media interest. Controversy has revolved around the area's popularity as a venue for public sex and prostitution among males, as well as for drug use and underage drinking; city centre councillor David Beckett said that it "has traditionally been known as the place to go for homosexual sex in Edinburgh". A male-on-male gang rape occurred on the site in 2000, and a man was arrested for encouraging tourists to watch him simulating sex with a traffic cone two years later.

In 2008, a member of staff at Blacks Outdoor Retail advised against camping in the area after a couple who had pitched a tent on the hill alleged that a man had made "lewd" and inappropriate advances towards them. Calton Hill has also been the site of assaults on gay people, and on people suspected of being gay: in 1997, a Japanese tourist required plastic surgery after being robbed and subjected to a "vicious, brutal, and sustained attack" by two assailants.

== Calton Hill Conservation Trust ==
The Calton Hill Conservation Trust, founded in 2024 is a registered charity whose objective is to "make the hill a cleaner, safer and more beautiful place". It is actively involved in projects for heritage and biodiversity management, archaeology etc and arrange events to celebrate the hill in all its aspects. They also organise volunteer groups to clear drainage, pick up litter, remove graffiti and stickers.

The Trust works closely with the City of Edinburgh Council who have responsibility for the Common Good Fund that owns the hill, NatureScot who manage the Site of Special Scientific Interest, and Edinburgh World Heritage who look after the World Heritage Site.

== See also ==
- Hills in Edinburgh
- Regent, Royal and Carlton Terrace Garden
- London Road Gardens
- Carlton Terrace, Edinburgh
- Regent Terrace
- Royal Terrace, Edinburgh
- Caltongate
- Calton Hill, New Zealand - a Dunedin, New Zealand suburb named after the hill in Edinburgh
