= Nelson Monument, Edinburgh =

Monument in Edinburgh, Scotland

Coordinates: 55°57′15.6″N 3°10′57.3″W

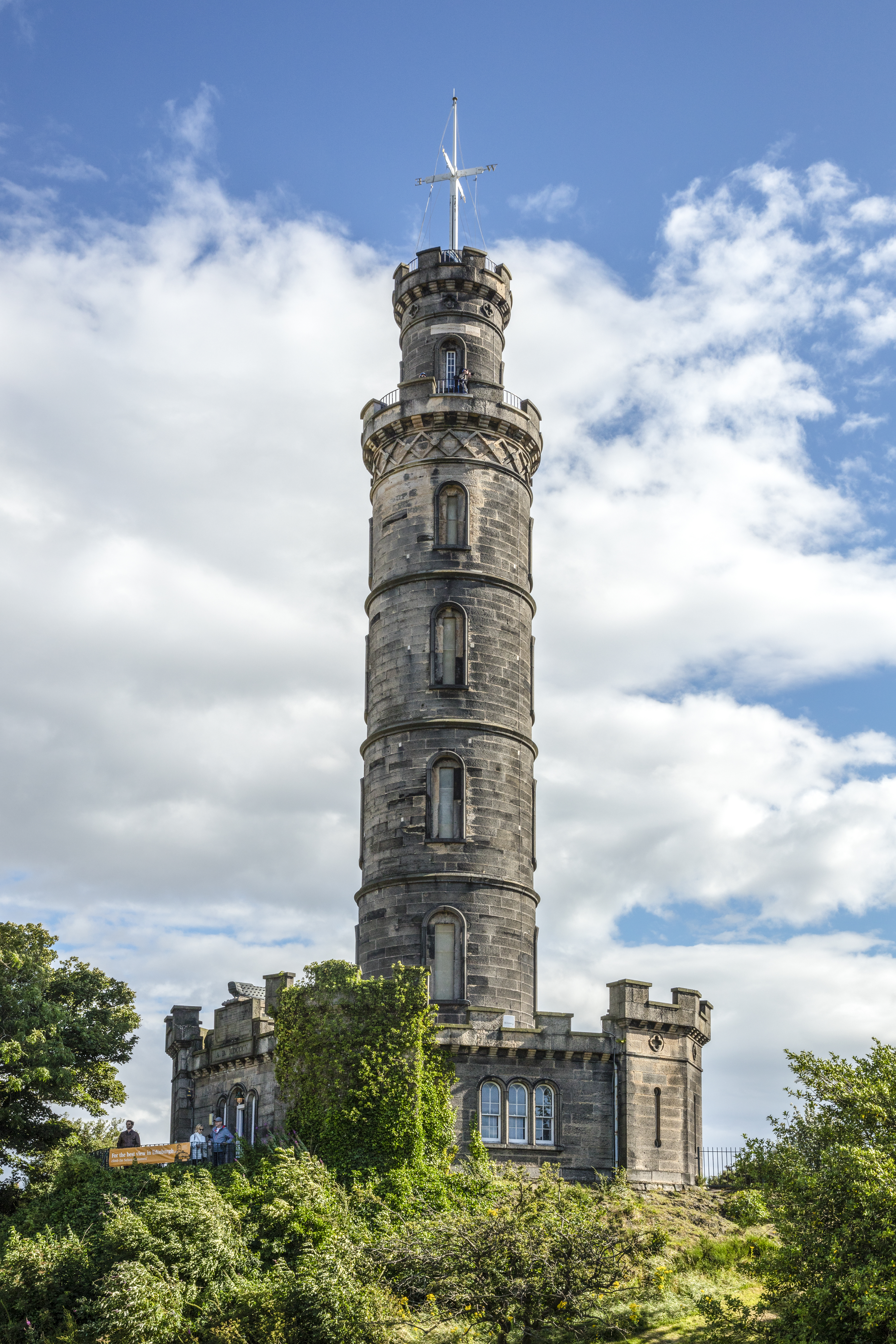
Nelson Monument

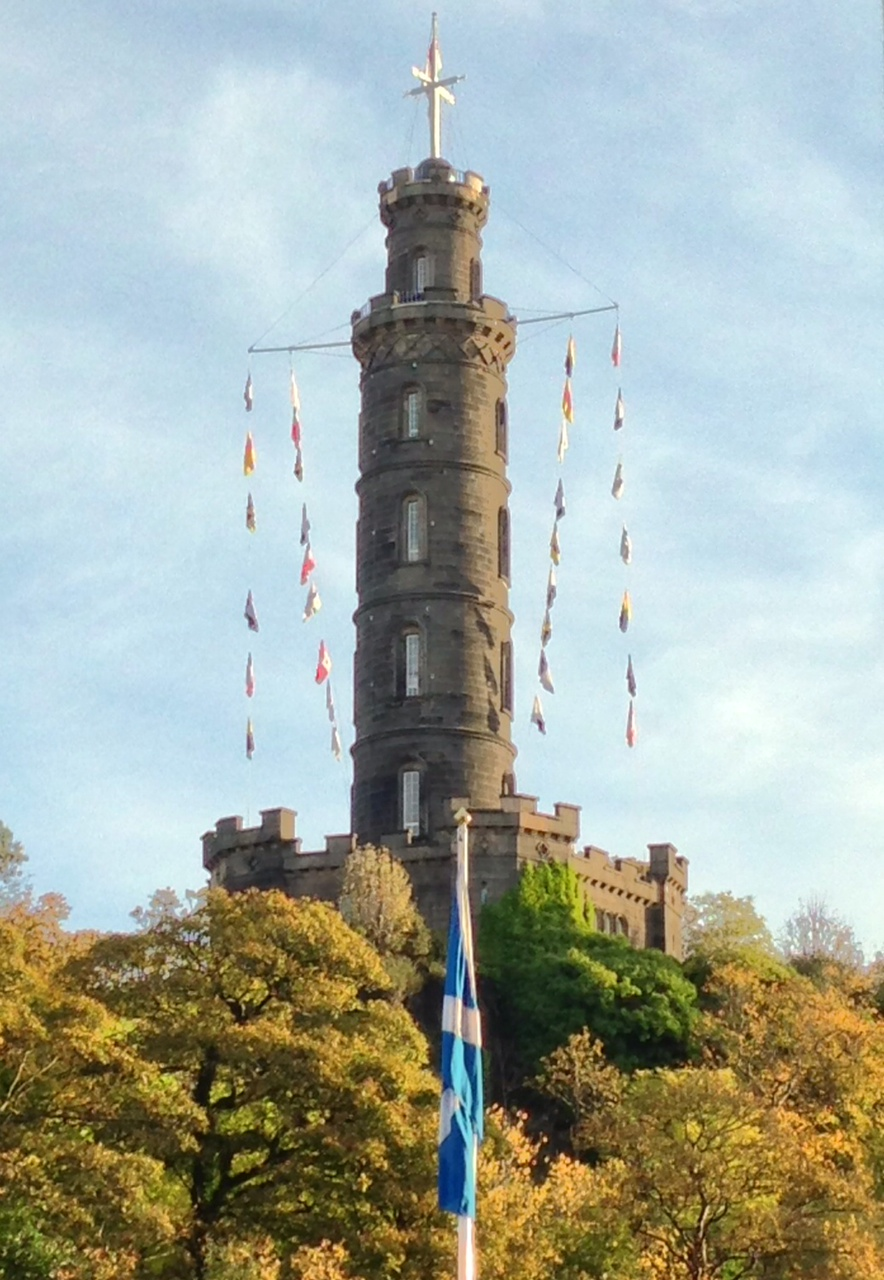
Flags flying from the Nelson Monument on Calton Hill on Trafalgar Day 2013

The Nelson Monument is a commemorative tower dedicated in honour of British Vice Admiral Horatio Nelson located in Edinburgh, Scotland, United Kingdom. It is situated on top of the Calton Hill at the end of Princes Street. The monument was built between 1807 and 1816 to commemorate Nelson's victory over the French and Spanish fleets at the Battle of Trafalgar in 1805, and his own death at the same battle. In 1852 a mechanized time ball was added, as a time signal to shipping in Leith harbour. The time ball is synchronized with the One O'Clock Gun firing from Edinburgh Castle. The monument was restored in 2009.

The British Royal Navy's White Ensign and signal flags spelling out Nelson's famous message "England expects that every man will do his duty" are flown from the monument on Trafalgar Day each year on the 21st October.

== History ==
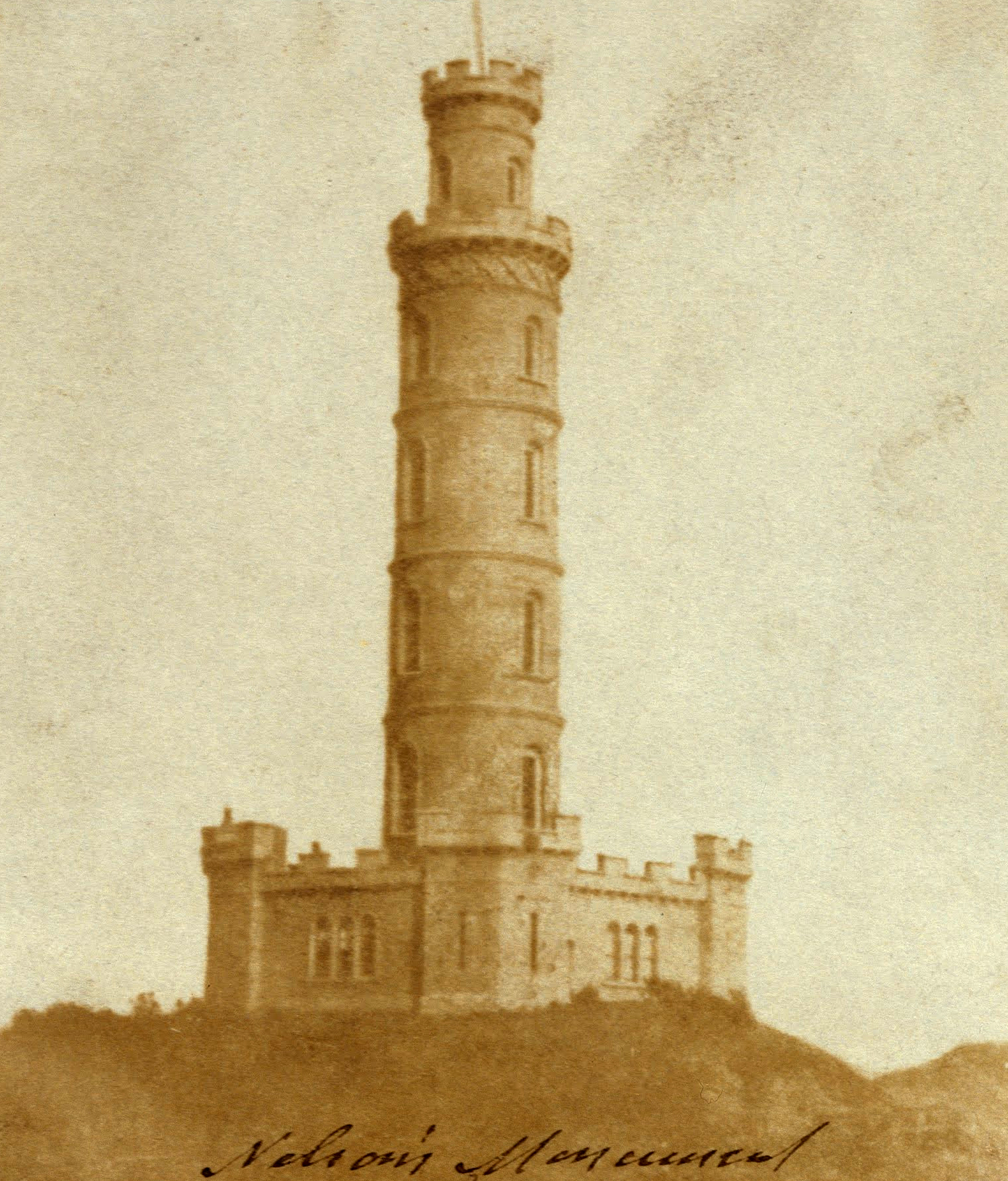
1843 photo of Nelson Monument taken by sir Robert Adamson

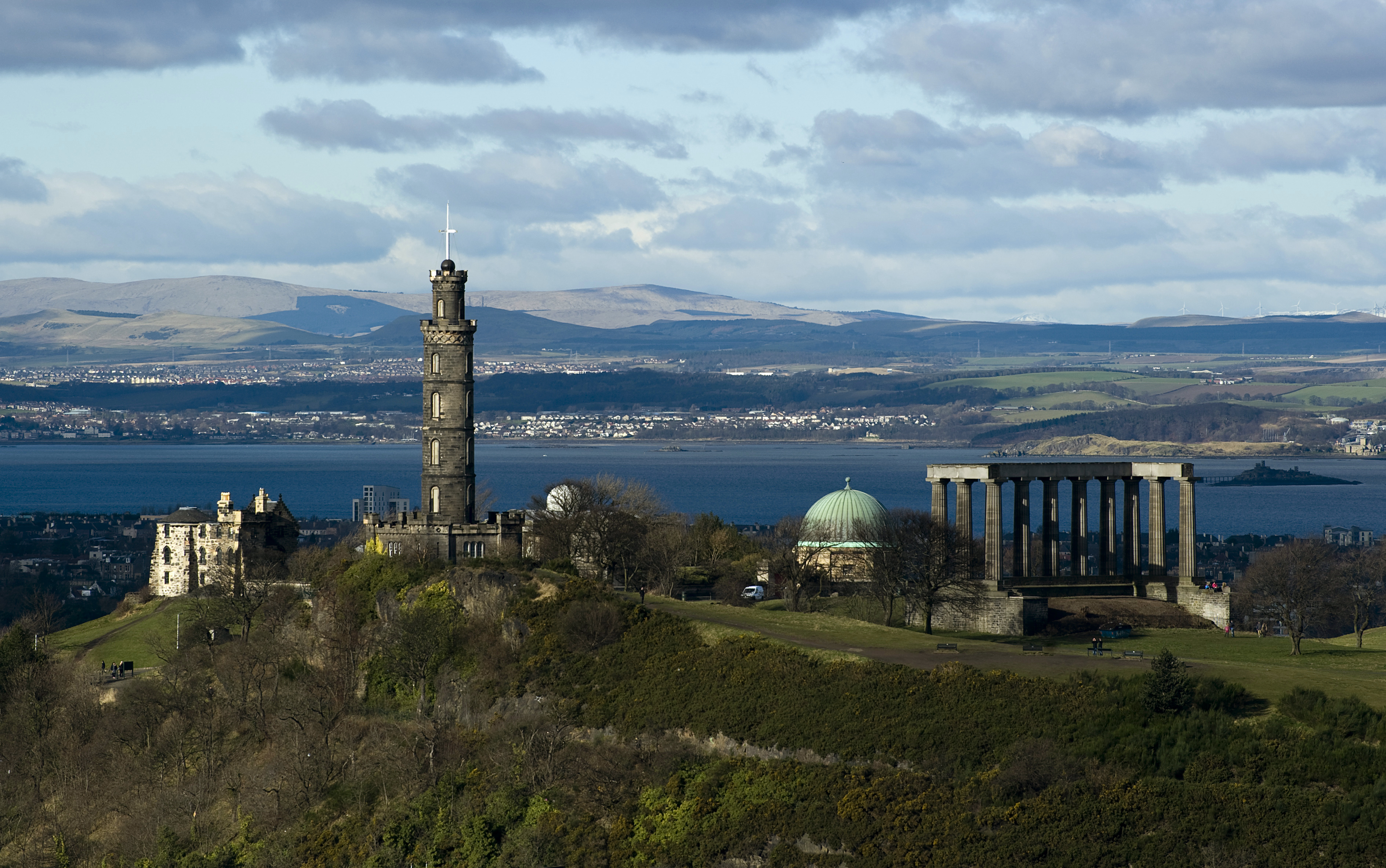
The Nelson Monument on top of the Calton Hill.

The monument was constructed at the highest point of Calton Hill, at 171 metres (561 ft) above sea-level, replacing an earlier mast used to send signals to shipping in the Forth. The monument was funded by public subscription and an initial design prepared by painter Alexander Nasmyth. His pagoda-like design was deemed too expensive, and an alternative design in the form of an upturned telescope—an object closely associated with Nelson—was obtained from the architect Robert Burn. Building began in 1807, and was almost complete when money ran out the following year. Burn died in 1815, and it was left to Thomas Bonnar to complete the pentagonal castellated building, which forms the base to the tower, between 1814 and 1816. The tower was intended as a signal mast, attended by sailors who would be accommodated within the ground floor rooms, although these were in use as a tea room by 1820. Public access was available from the start, for a small fee. The rooms were later used to house the monument's caretaker. In 2009, as part of the "Twelve Monuments Restoration Project", the tower was comprehensively restored, including repairs to stonework and metalwork. The monument is a category A listed building in the UK.

The monument is 32 metres (105 ft) high, and has 143 steps leading to a public viewing gallery. The castellated design reflects the castellated prison buildings which stood on the south side of Calton Hill in the early 19th century.

A plaque above the entrance to the monument carries the following dedication:

To the memory of Vice-Admiral Horatio Lord Viscount Nelson, and of the great victory of Trafalgar, too dearly purchased with his blood, the grateful citizens of Edinburgh have erected this monument: not to express their unavailing sorrow for his death; nor yet to celebrate this matchless glories of his life; but, by his noble example, to teach their sons to emulate what they admire, and, like him, when duty requires it, to die for their country. AD MDCCCV

Above the plaque is a stone carving of the Spanish San Josef, a ship captured by Nelson and his crew during the Battle of Cape St Vincent in 1797.

== Time ball ==
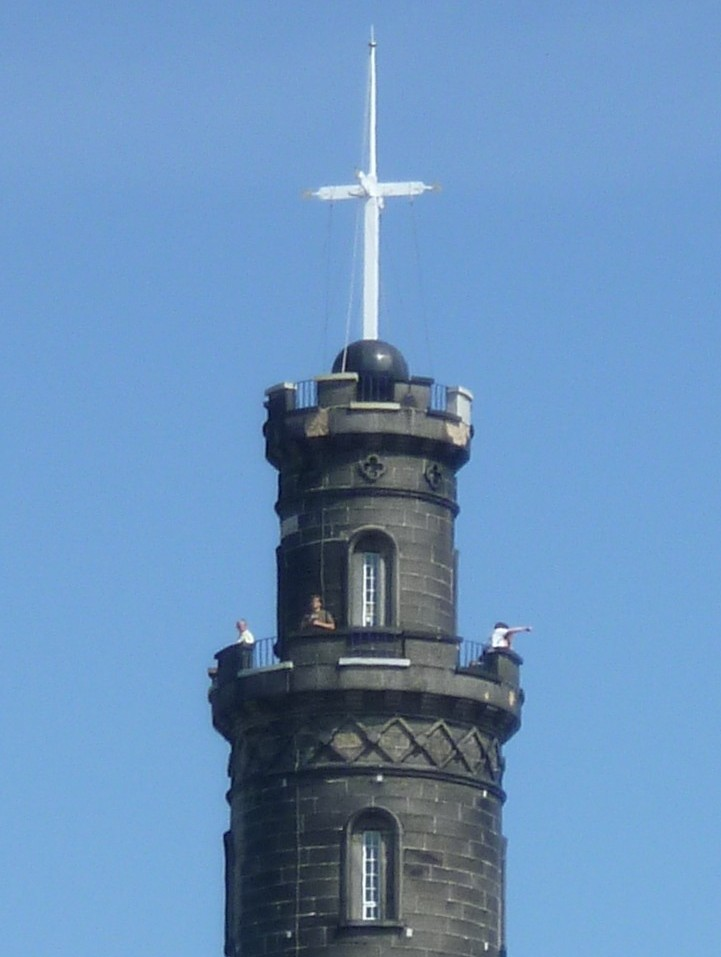
Time ball on the Nelson Monument

On top of the tower is a time ball, a large ball which is raised and lowered to mark the time. It was installed in 1853 and became operational in March 1854 to act as a time signal to the ships in Edinburgh's port of Leith, and to ships at the anchorage in the Firth of Forth known as Leith Roads, allowing the ships to set their chronometers. The time ball was the idea of Charles Piazzi Smyth, the Astronomer Royal for Scotland, and was originally triggered by a clock in the adjacent City Observatory, to which it was connected by an underground wire. The mechanism was the work of Maudslay, Sons & Field of Lambeth, who had previously constructed the time ball mechanism for Greenwich Observatory. The installation was carried out by James Ritchie & Son who are still retained by City of Edinburgh Council to maintain and operate the time ball.

The ball, constructed of wood and covered in zinc, and originally weighing about 90 kg, is raised just before 1 pm, and at precisely 1 pm, is dropped from atop the mast. The commonly stated mass of 15 cwt (762 kg) is a myth stemming from an exaggeration by Piazzi Smyth in 1853. Later, in 1861, the One O'Clock Gun was established at Edinburgh Castle to provide an audible signal when fog obscured the time ball. The time ball was operated for over 150 years, until it was damaged by a storm in 2007. In 2009, as part of the restoration of the monument, the time ball was removed, and the mechanism repaired. The time ball was brought back into service on 24 September 2009. The mechanism is now operated manually, based on the firing of the One O'Clock Gun.

== See also ==
- Monuments and memorials to Horatio Nelson, 1st Viscount Nelson, for other monuments to Lord Nelson
- Nelson’s Column at Trafalgar square in London, England, United Kingdom
