= Calton Hill Conservation Trust =

Scottish conservation charity

Calton Hill Conservation Trust is an organisation of concerned citizens and volunteers, registered as a charity, dedicated to the protection of Calton Hill, an important designed landscape in the centre of Edinburgh's World Heritage Site, a Site of Special Scientific Interest and a premier city centre public park, belonging to the Common Good of historic property, which is owned by the people of the city.

The Trust works alongside other organisations to "make the hill a cleaner, safer and more beautiful place".

== Establishment ==
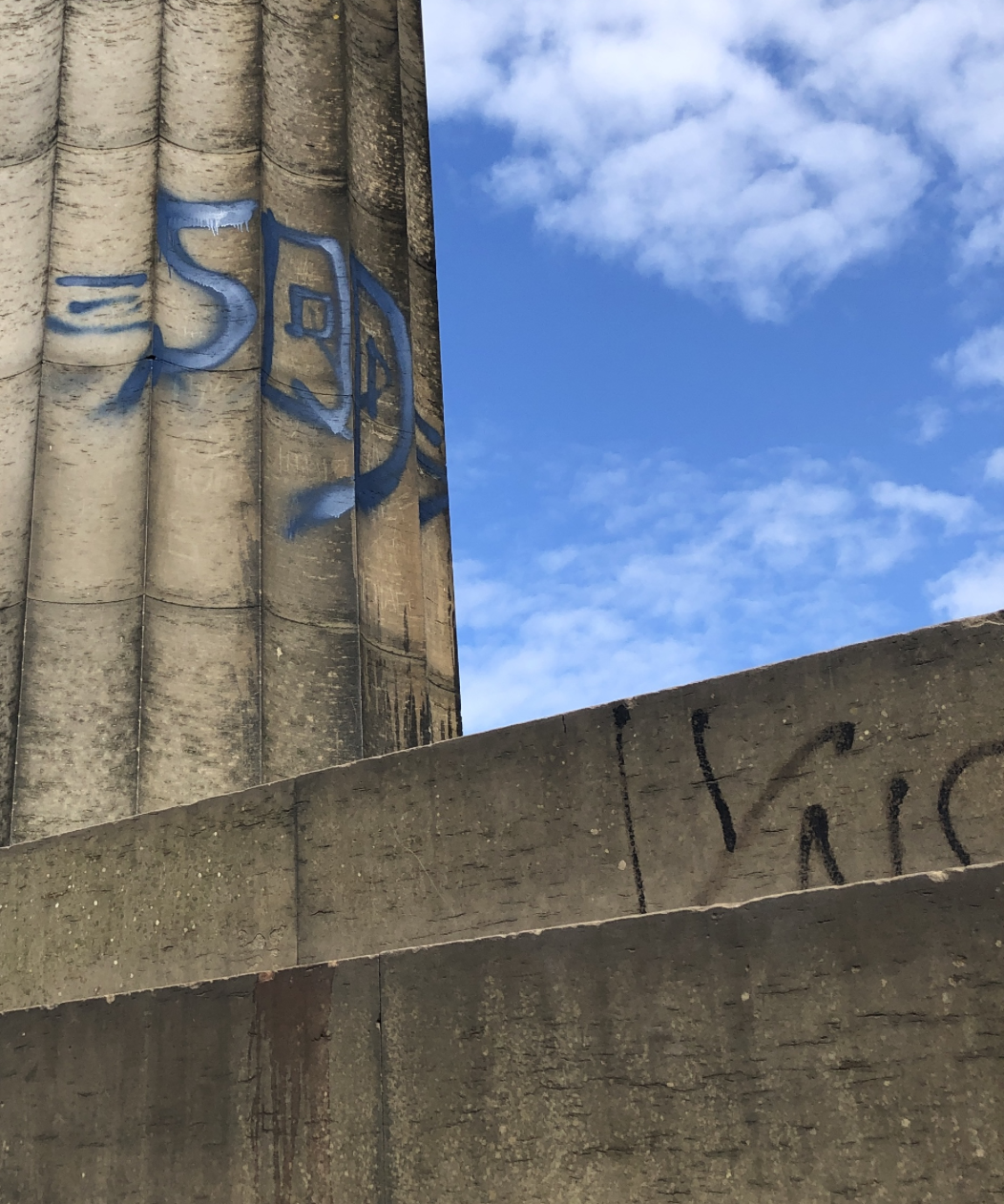
Graffiti on the National Monument, 1 June 2022. This was one of a number of issues that spurred the formation of the Action Group.

Following many years of neglect, and issues relating to ground erosion, litter, graffiti, and un-restricted vehicular access to the park, a group of residents formed an Action Group on 24 January 2023, that became an association called the 'Friends of Calton Hill', formally launched and opened to public membership on 29 March 2023.

On 18 May 2024, the association adopted the name 'Calton Hill Conservation Trust' with a new constitution and applied to become a charity, which was registered with the Office of the Scottish Charity Regulator (OSCR) on 15 August 2024 with the number SC053572.

Visiting Calton Hill in 2024, the Scottish politician Angus Robertson commended the work of the Trust:

"Founded with a clear vision to improve the hill's cleanliness, safety, and overall beauty, this group has done a tremendous amount of good in a short space of time. They organise a range of activities that tap into the hill's rich geology, archaeology, history and biodiversity, bringing together the community through meetings, walks and events. Regular litter collection drives and restoration efforts have been key to their work."

== Policies ==
The Trust has six main policies, adopted on 1 November 2025 at a special members' meeting, as follows:

"1. Support sustainable visitor access that protects the hill’s unique character and heritage, and ensures it remains an attractive and rewarding destination, both for the sake of the hill itself and the wider tourism economy. 2. Combat physical degradation of the hill and advocate for its good upkeep and maintenance. 3. Improve on-site information for both locals and visitors. 4. Make the hill more accessible to all. 5. Protect the hill as a Site of Special Scientific Interest, so we have a more beautiful natural environment with better quality and variety of wildlife, based on the encouragement of native species of flora and fauna. 6. Establish a nature reserve on the western side of the hill."

== Projects ==
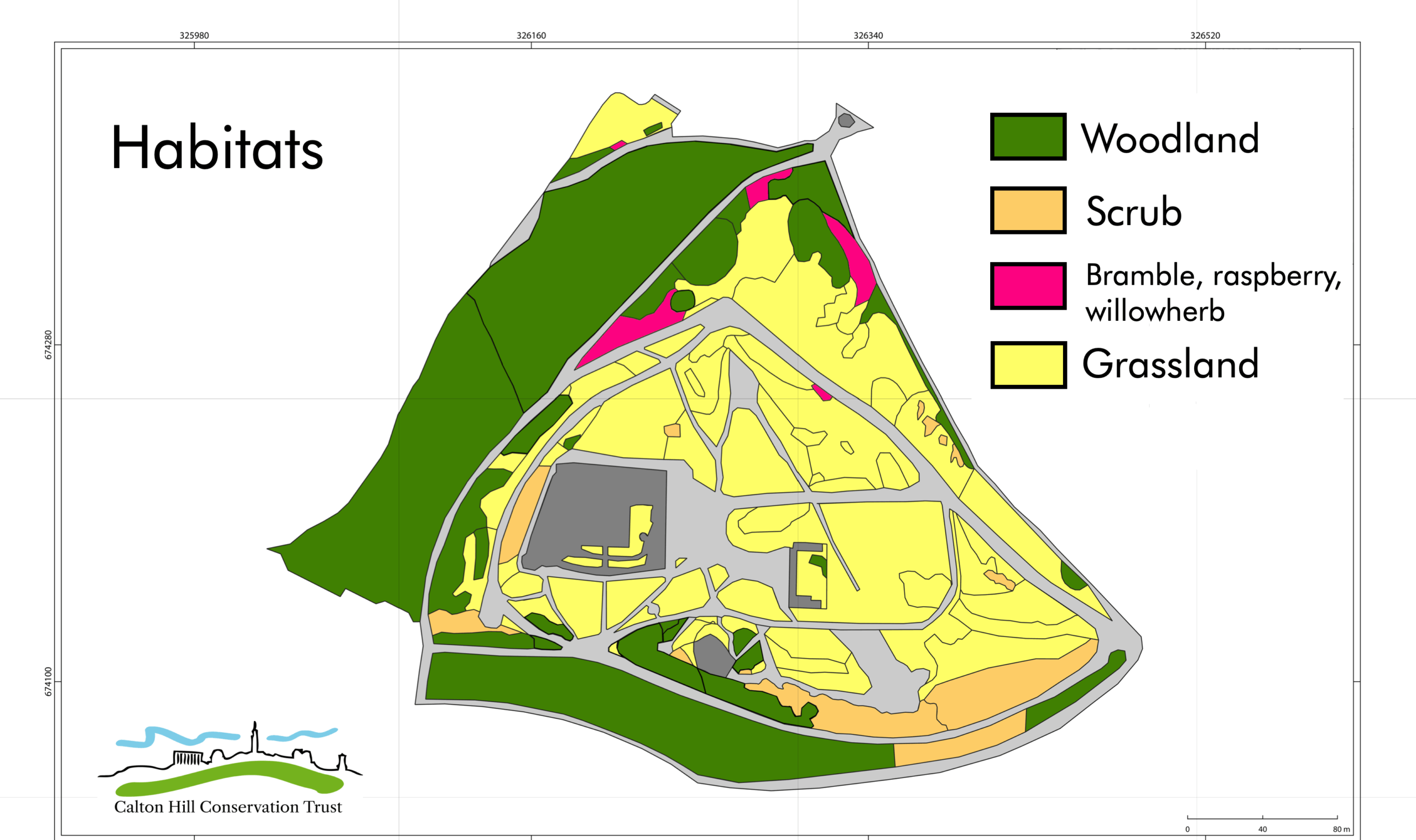
Map of Habitats based on the Vegetation Survey of Calton Hill, October 2024

The Trust received a grant from Inspiring Scotland's Neighbourhood Ecosystem Fund to survey nature on Calton Hill and develop a Biodiversity Management Plan in 2024 and 2025.

A key component of the plan was a detailed Vegetation Survey by botanist and plant surveyor Ben Averis, using the National Vegetation Classification to divide the hill into 125 polygons with 37 vegetation types. The survey was entered into a Geographical Information System.

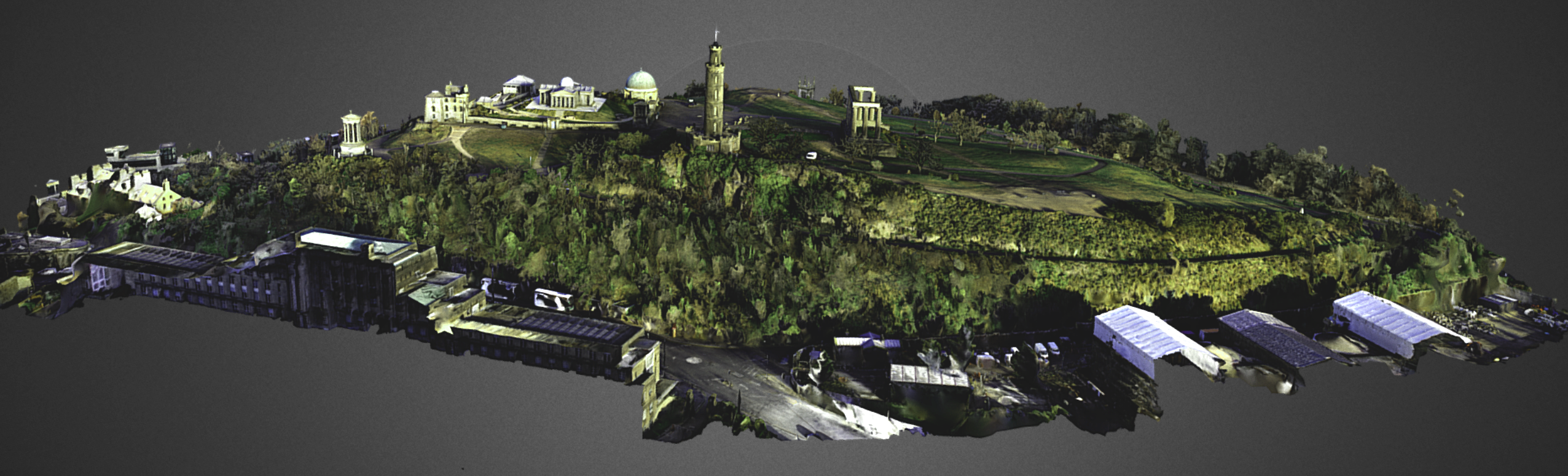
Three-dimensional model of Calton Hill, Edinburgh created from photogrammetry data, January 2026

The Trust launched a Calton Hill Archaeology Project in early 2026, together with Headland Archaeology. Involving a remote sensing photogrammetry survey, walks and workshops, but no invasive work, it is hoped the project will lead to a better understanding of the landscape and heritage of the hill. The project received an Edinburgh Community Grant Fund

The Trust have been talking to partners about updating the Calton Hill Management Planoriginally commissioned by Edinburgh World Heritage from LUC and published in April 2017.

The Trust is involved in a project to refurbish existing information boards that were installed in different locations on the hill, around 2007 and add to them, not only in English but also in other languages using QR codes or similar.

== Erosion emergency ==
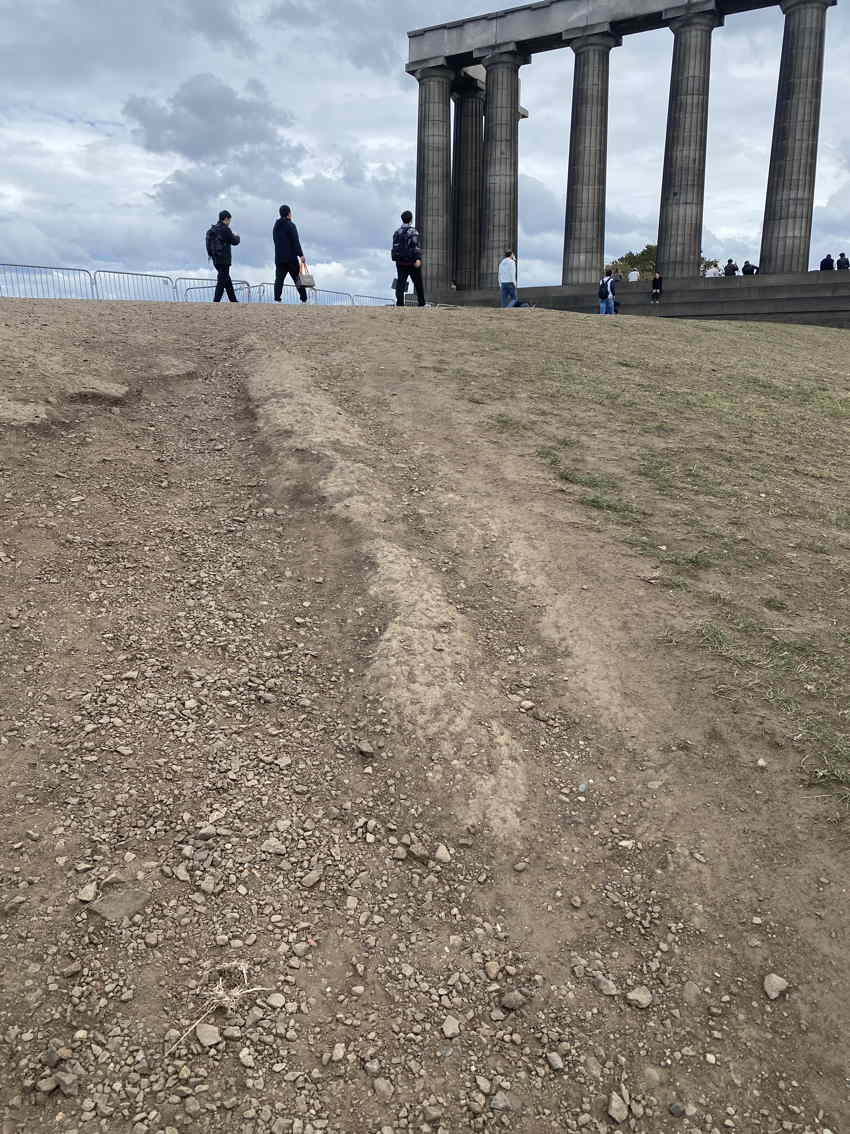
Erosion in front of the National Monument, Calton Hill, 9 September 2025

The Trust has been concerned about the progressive erosion of soil and grass on the top of the hill, clearly evident from aerial photographs, especially after 2009–2010. The Trust declared an 'Erosion Emergency' on 12 September 2025, reporting:

"The erosion of the top soil on Calton Hill this summer has been the worst for many years. The deterioration in the general condition of the ground has been severe. Erosion is the biggest problem we face. We can pick up litter in a moment, contractors can move portaloos in a day, volunteers could unblock all the drainage channels within in a week or two — but the repair of erosion takes time and money. Erosion takes place in the summer when the ground is dry. Water is not available on the hill, unless it is brought up there by bowser trucks. The large number of visitors adds to the wear and tear and the compaction of the ground. Erosion occurs in areas where the grass has been repeatedly cut short — on the assumption that it will rain regularly. There is no erosion where the grass has been left uncut by the local authority. Sometimes you can actually see the earth blowing away in the wind."

This led to public and national media interest in the state of the hill.

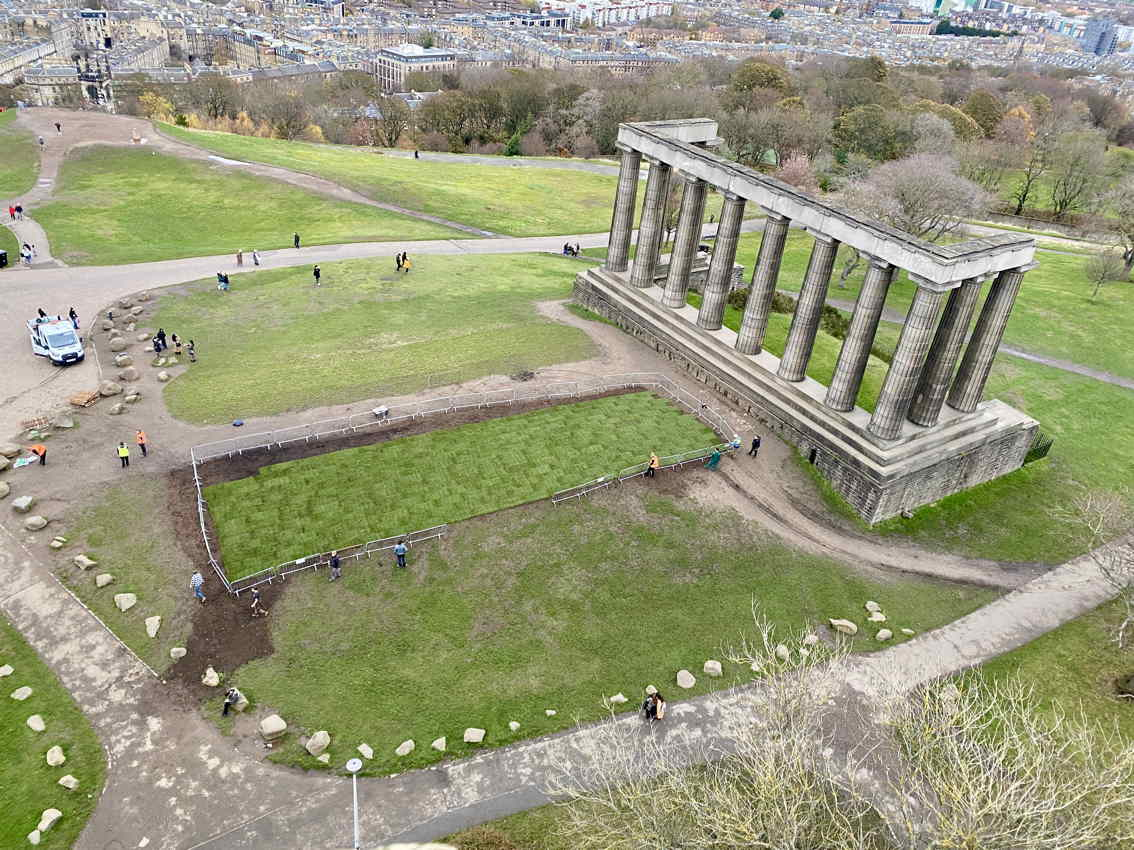
Community-financed re-turfing area on Calton Hill, Edinburgh 12 November 2025

The Edinburgh Council declined to release park levy money for re-turfing. So instead the Trust turned to the community to fund the returfing of a barren, eroded area on top of the hill in front of the National Monument of Scotland, and 300 square metres were laid with new grass with funds coming from the Trust itself, the Collective Gallery, Café Calton and the Seven Hills Race.

== Other work of the Trust ==
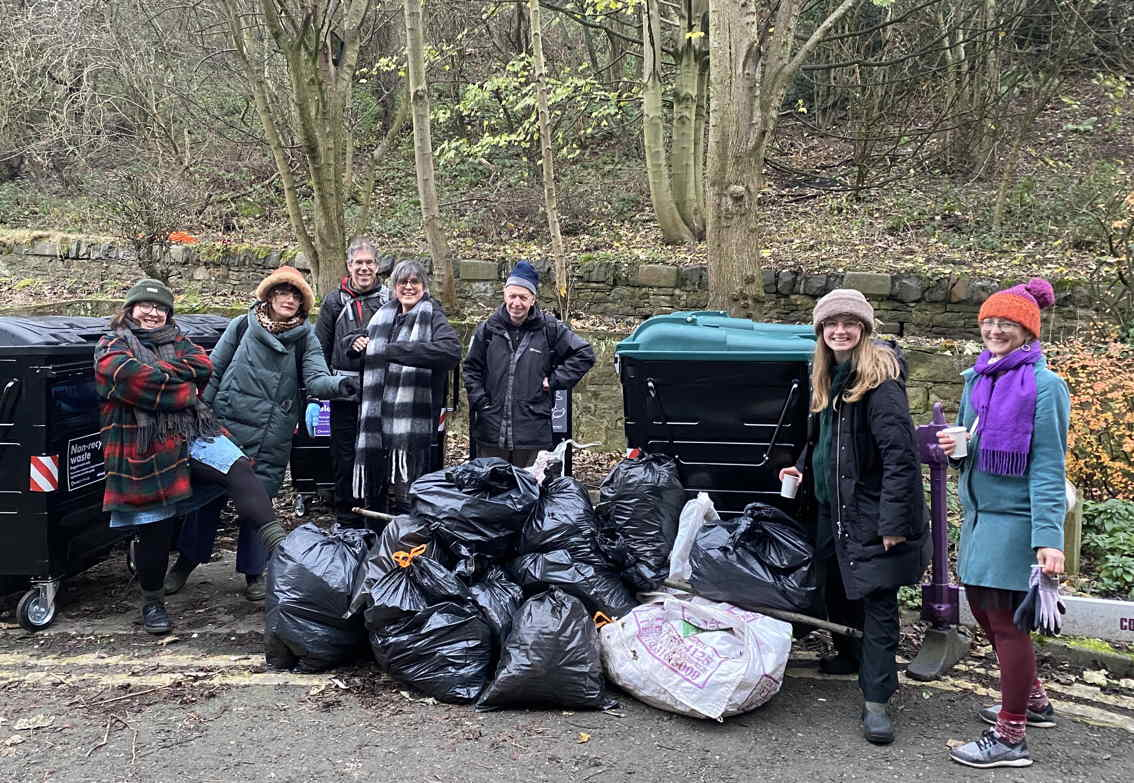
Litter pick group at Greenside, Calton Hill, Edinburgh 11 December 2024

Litter on Calton Hill has gradually been brought under control through community action, although large deposits still remain around Greenside, on the western side of the site.

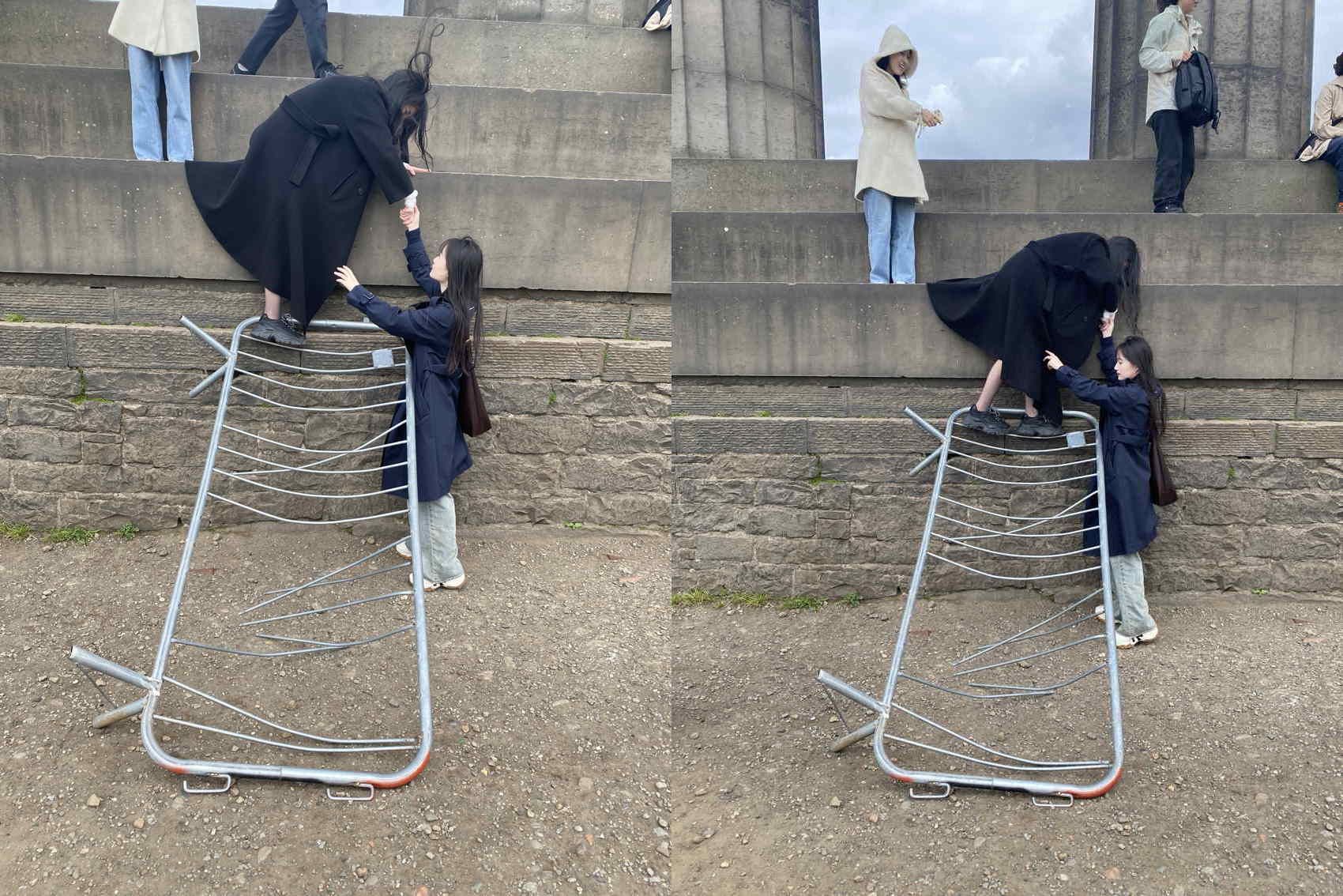
Visitors using removed crowd-control barriers to climb on to the National Monument, Calton Hill, 24 May 2025

The Trust applied for a Calton Hill Firework Control Zone for November 2024, which was repeated in November 2025, resulting in reduced noise, litter and damage to the grass. The control zone will also be in operation in November 2026.

Safety and security has been a concern of the Calton Hill Conservation Trust due to a number of instances of vandalism, arson, dirt-bike riding and anti-social behaviour that occurred in 2025. There have also been a number of accidents to visitors who have climbed on top of the National Monument. The Trust is working with Edinburgh Council and Police Scotland to try to solve these problems.

== Portaloo controversy ==
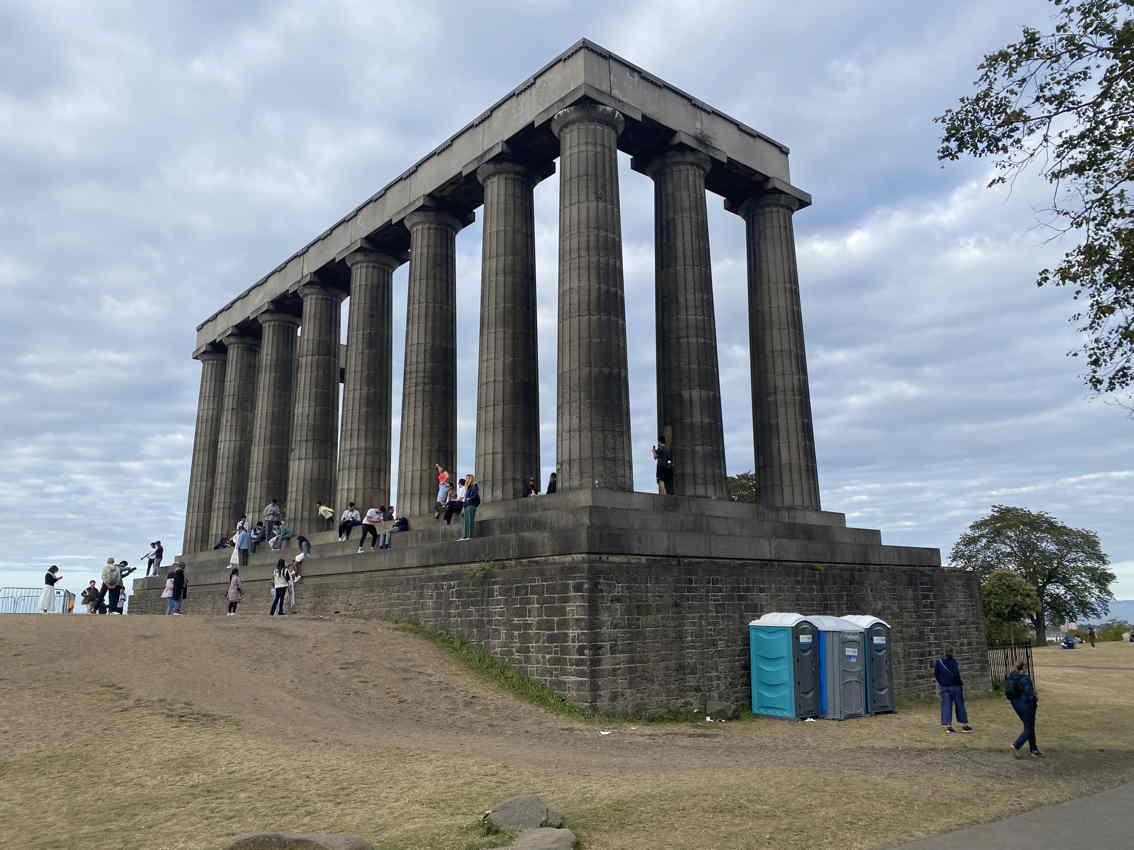
Temporary toilets at the National Monument, Calton Hill, Edinburgh 21 August 2025

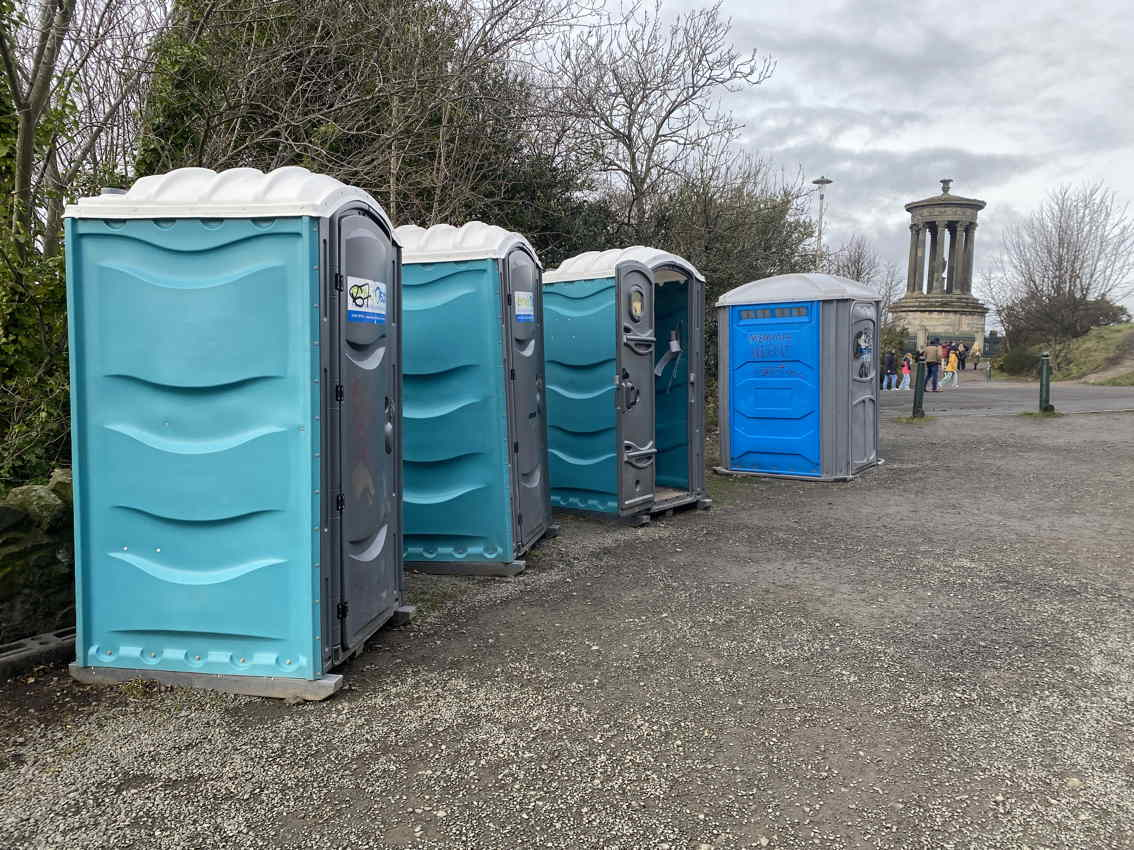
Temporary toilets on Regent Walk, Calton Hill, Edinburgh, 21 February 2026

Around 21 August 2025, Edinburgh Council contractors unexpectedly installed temporary toilets or portaloos against the foundation wall of the National Monument, a memorial to servicemen who died in the course of the Napoleonic Wars.

The story was taken up by The Times and The Scottish Sun as a national issue. The Trust's chair Simon Holledge was quoted as saying, “We are certainly concerned about the appearance of portaloos, their location up against the National Monument, and particularly the fact they are causing damage to the grass. We’ve asked the council to remove the portaloos to the hard surfaced car park as soon as possible.” They were subsequently moved to Regent Walk on the south side of the hill.

== Other controversies ==
The Trust have been concerned that the Calton Hill Drive Access Barrier, at the foot of the road up to top of the hill has been left open to general traffic since 2018, despite Edinburgh Council policies against the use of cars in public parks, and notices explaining 'authorised vehicles only'. In addition to safety, there are issues relating to litter, noise and damage to the grass. In a statement dated 10 July 2024, the Trust asked Edinburgh Council, "to take action to set a date for closing the barrier to general unauthorised traffic of no later than 1 October 2024."

The Trust have also had concerns about budget allocations by the Edinburgh Council for parks, specifically small sums for solving general maintenance problems.

"Calton Hill Conservation Trust were disappointed by the prospect, set out in the report to the Culture & Communities Committee, of a hypothetical grant of £50,000 – from an as yet unidentified source and at an unspecified date – that might be divided among 85 community groups . . . City councillors speak warmly about the invaluable contribution of volunteers who give their time freely to care for Edinburgh’s green spaces — the sentiment is greatly appreciated — but to quote (or misquote?) George Bernard Shaw, “why don’t they try money?” "

== Gallery ==
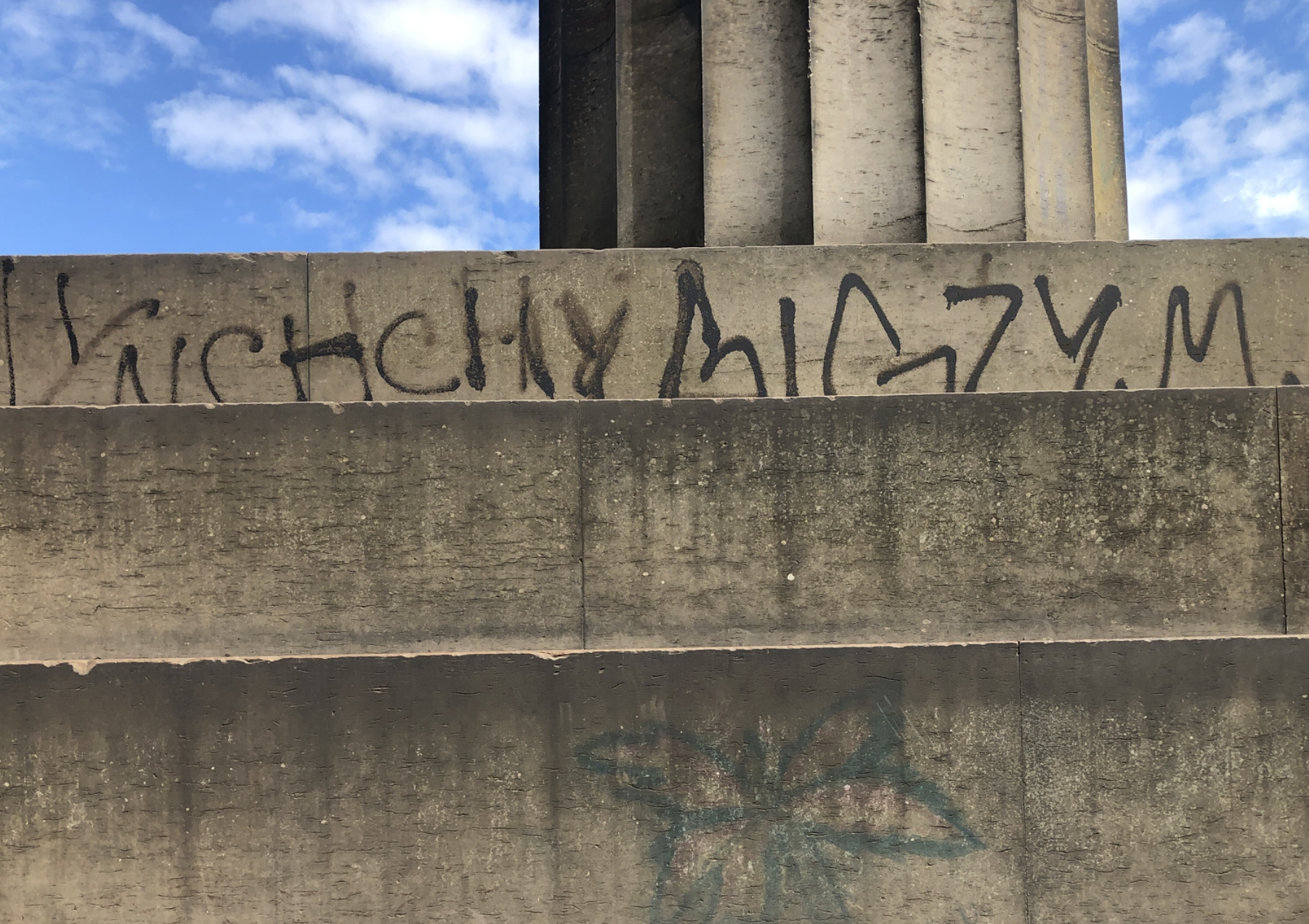
1

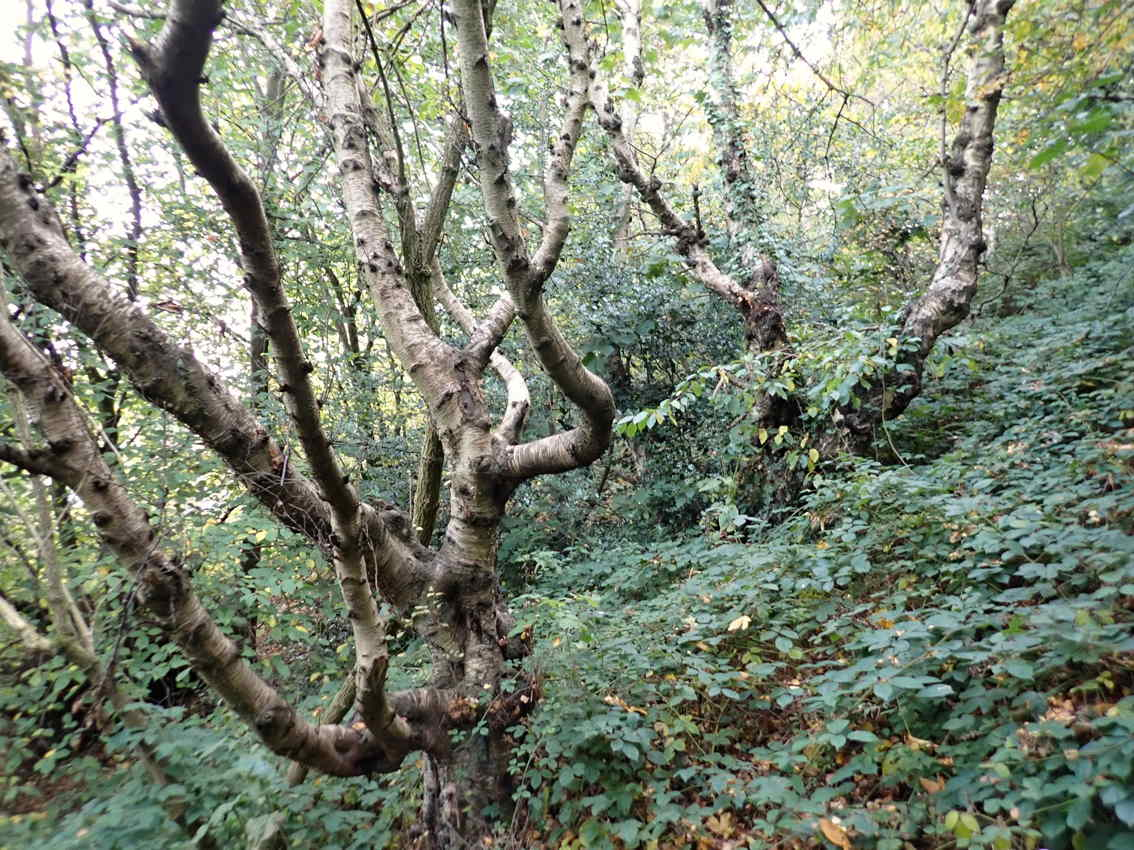
2

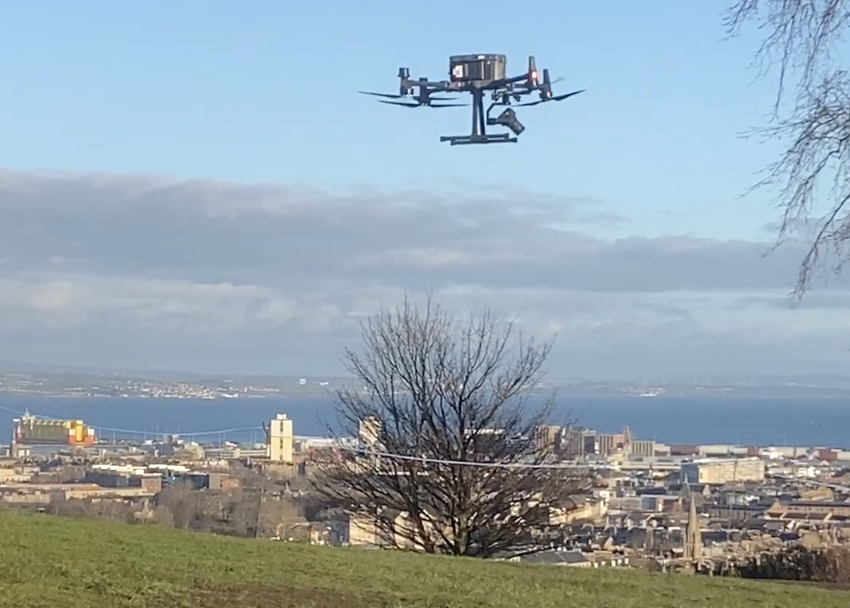
3

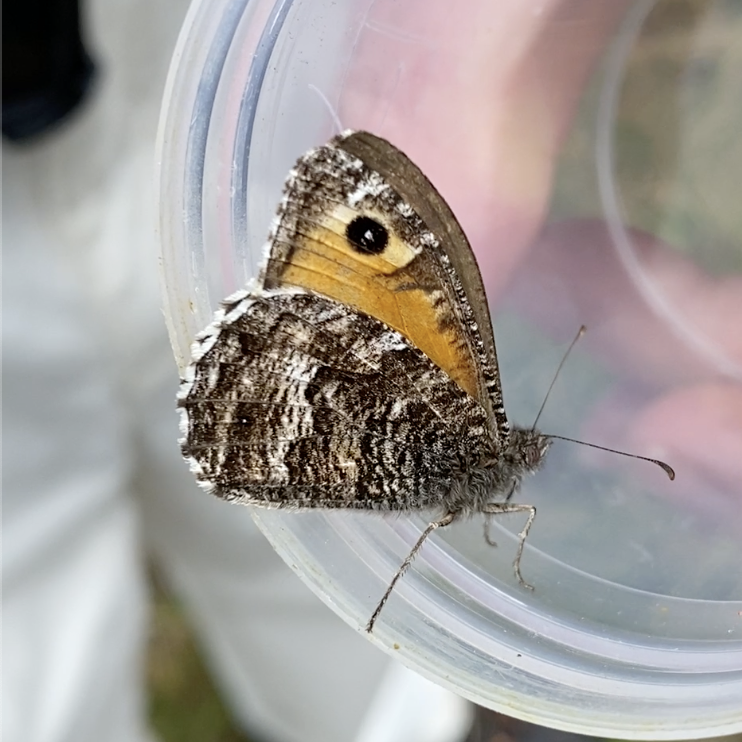
4

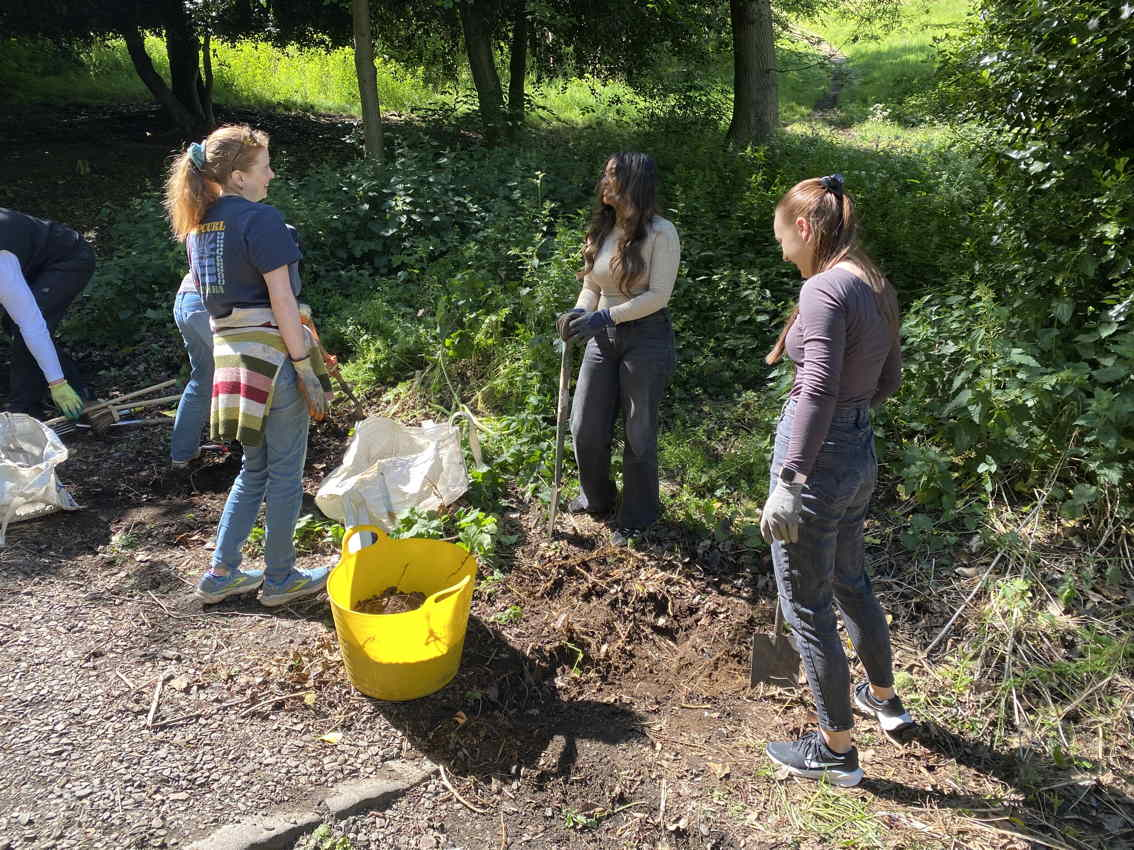
5

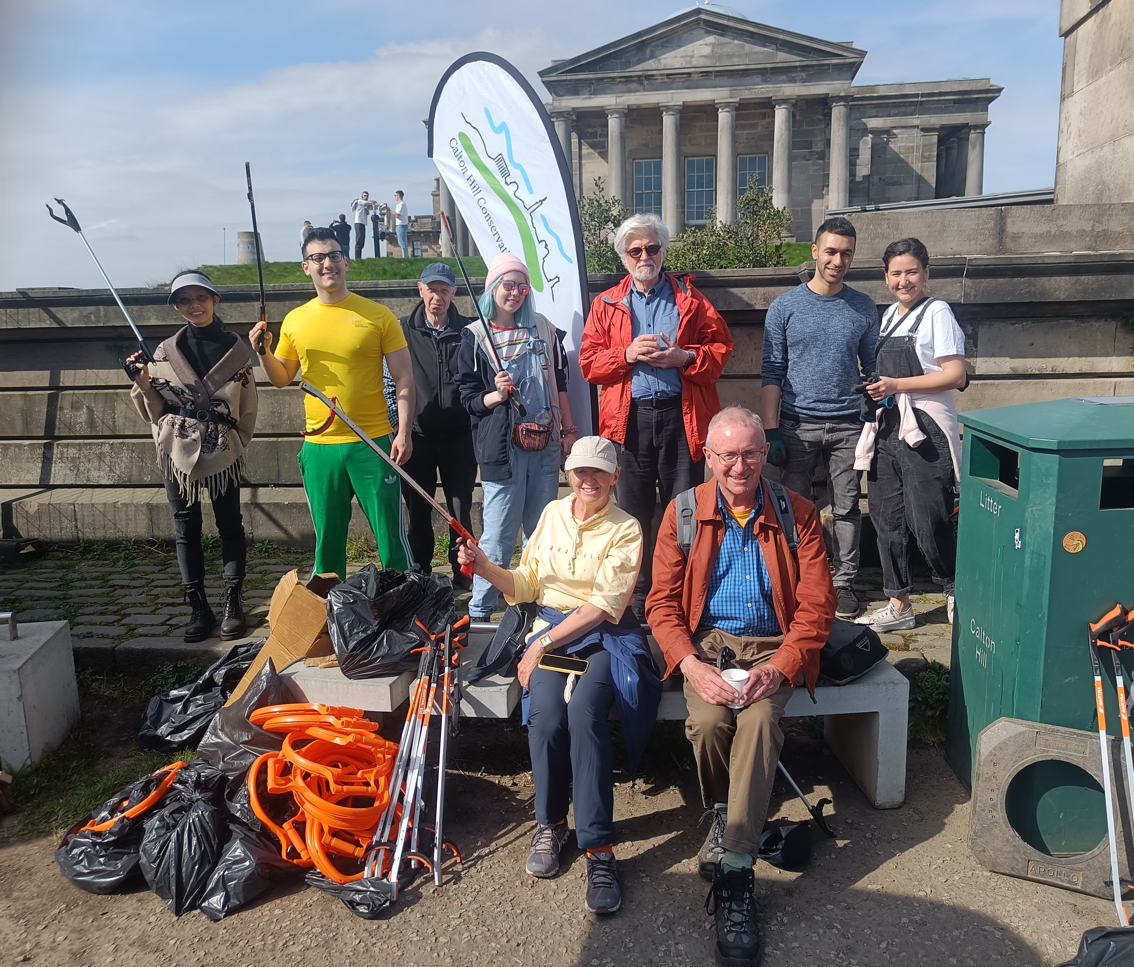
6

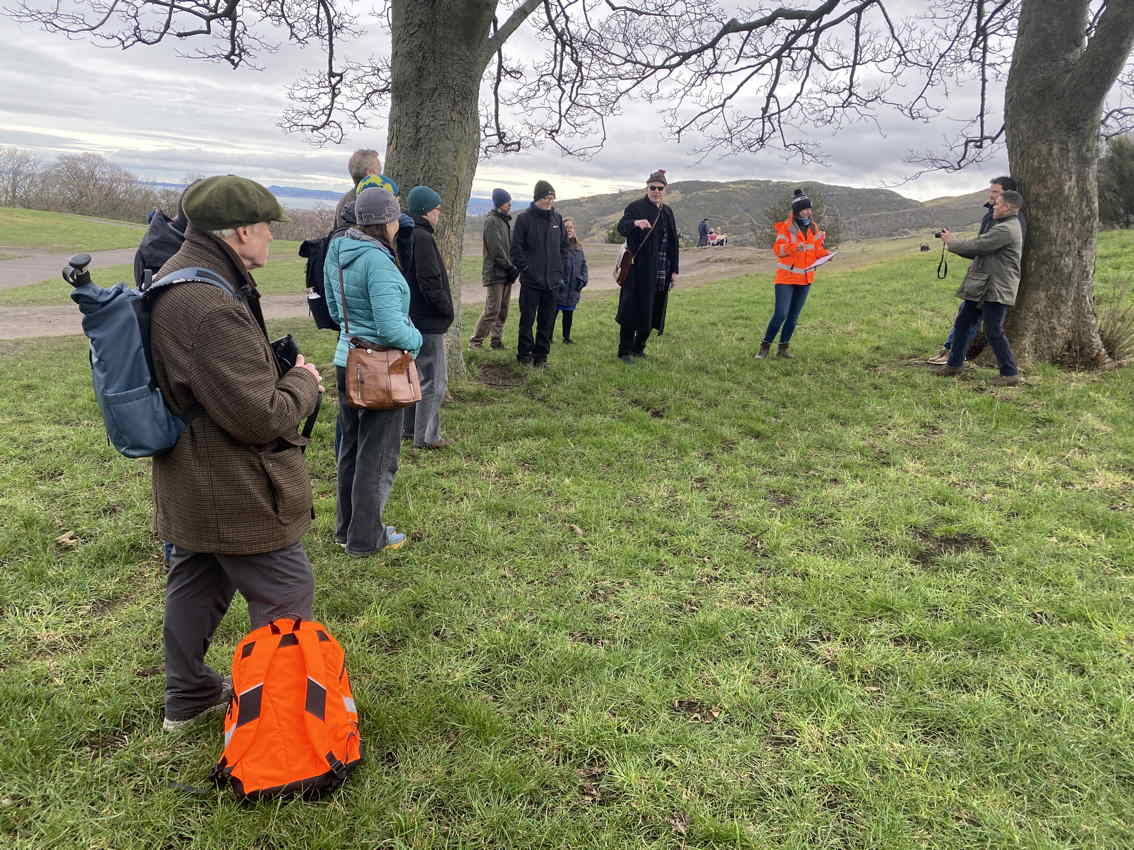
7

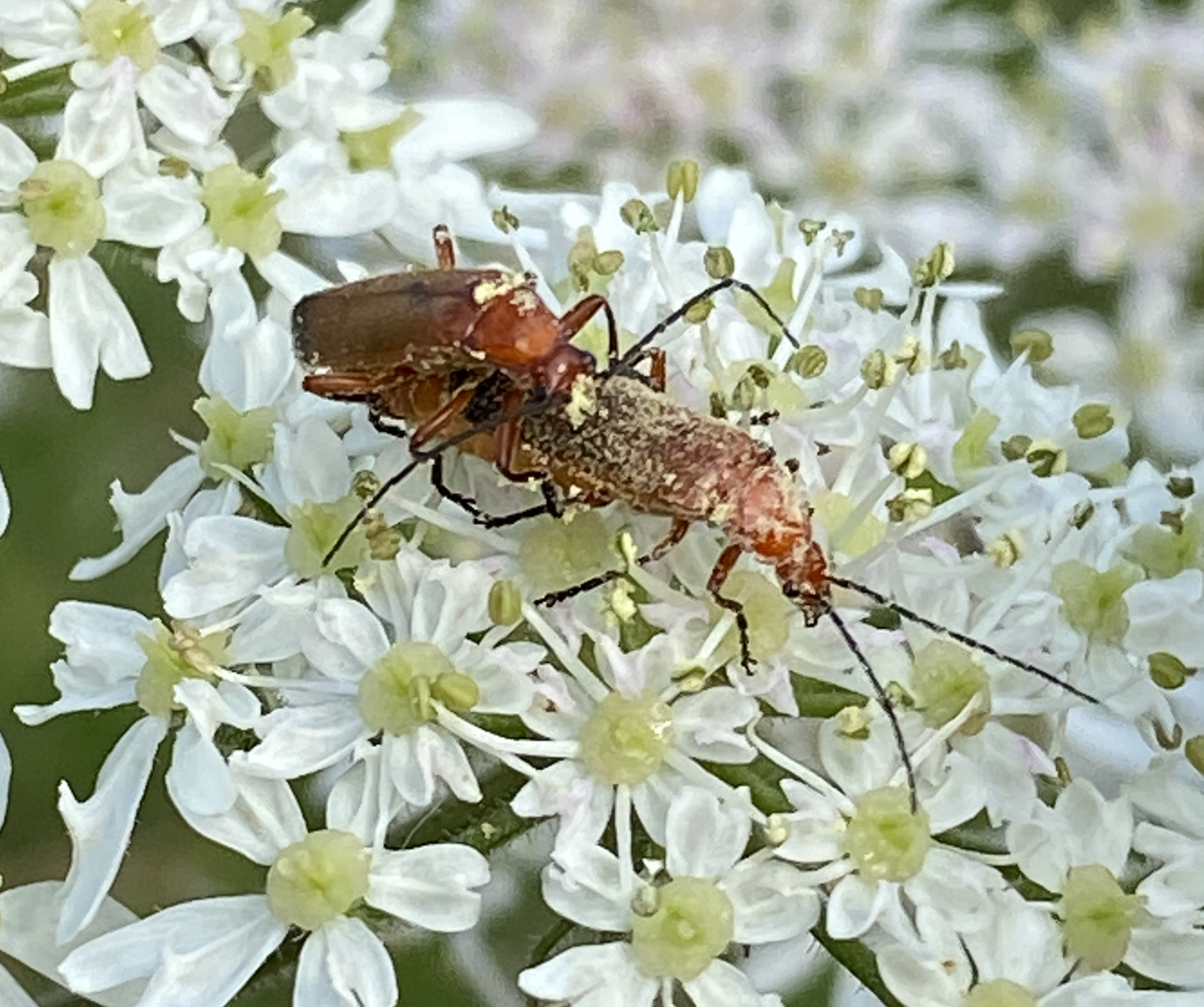
8

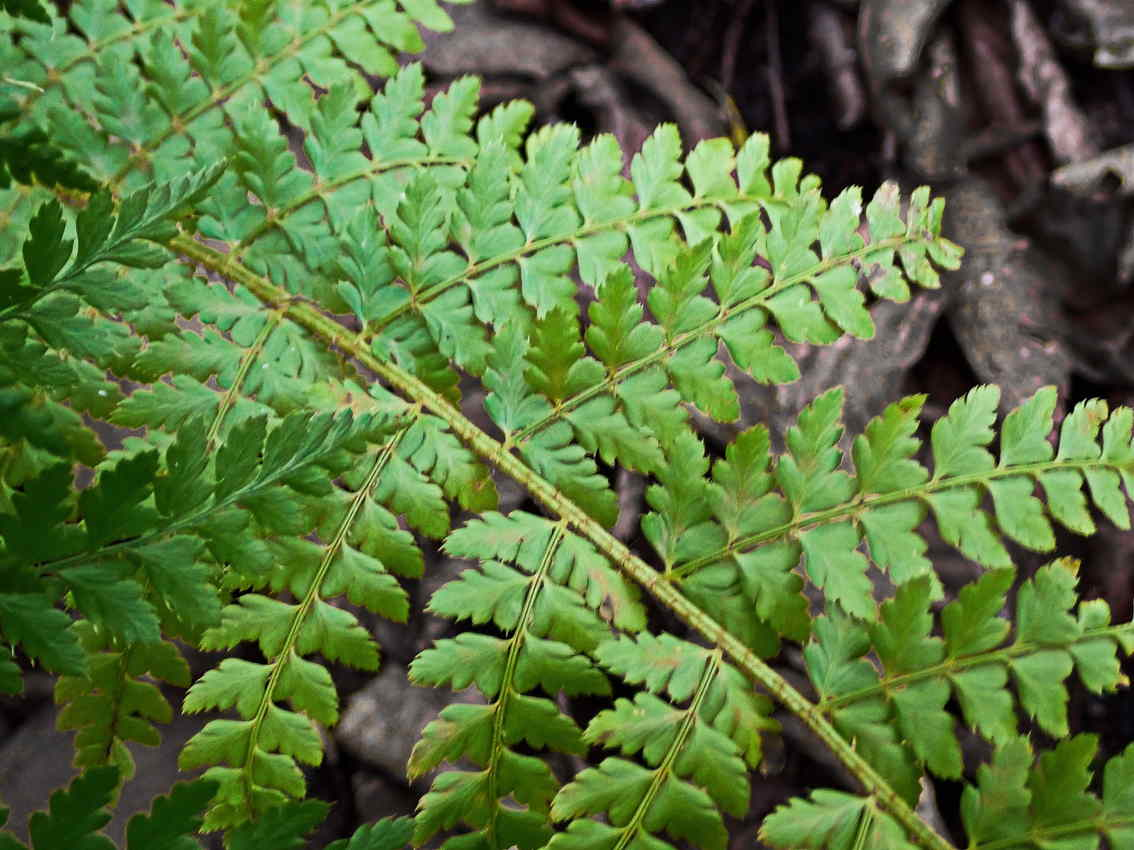
9

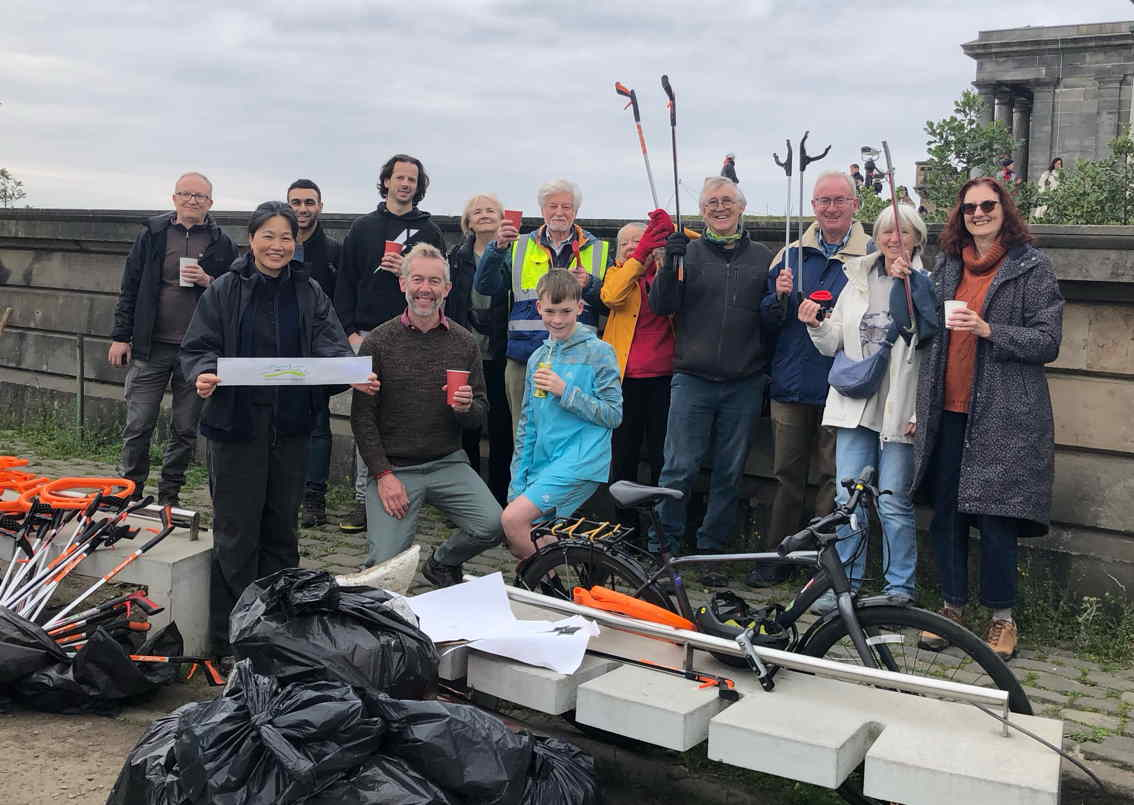
10

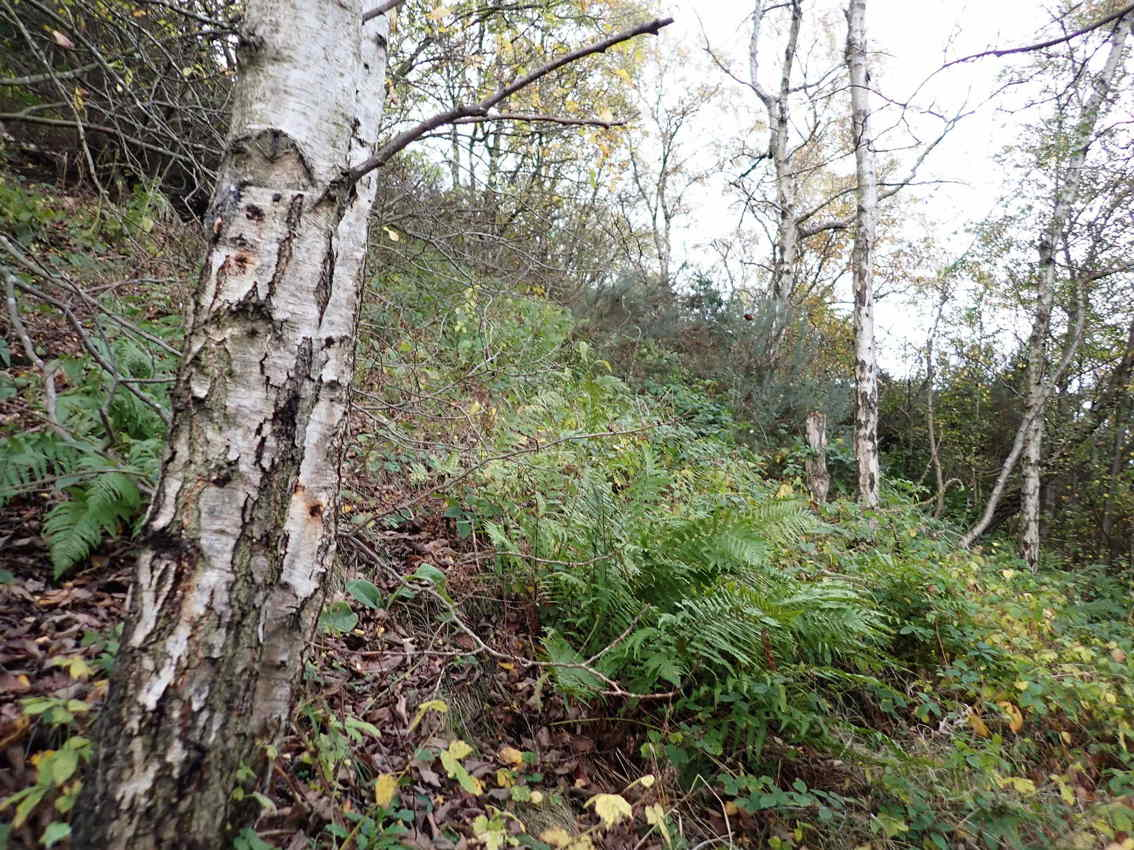
11

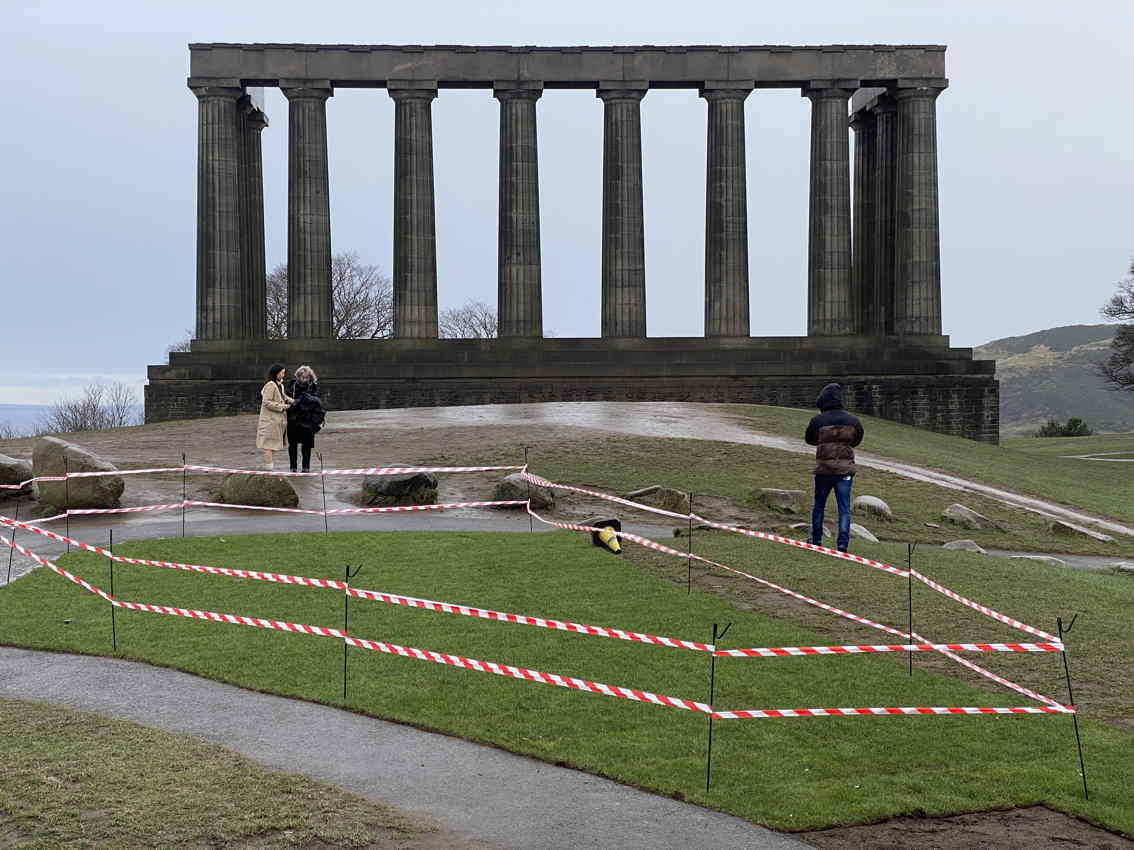
12

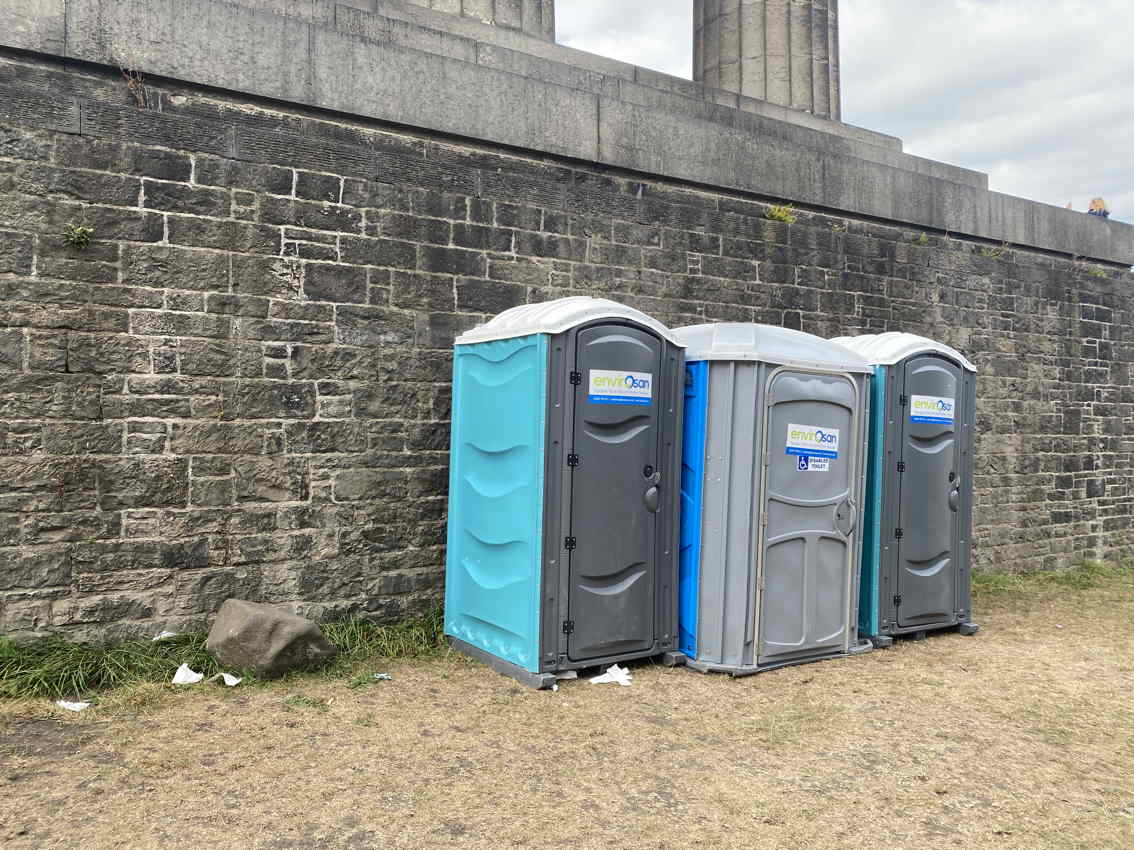
13

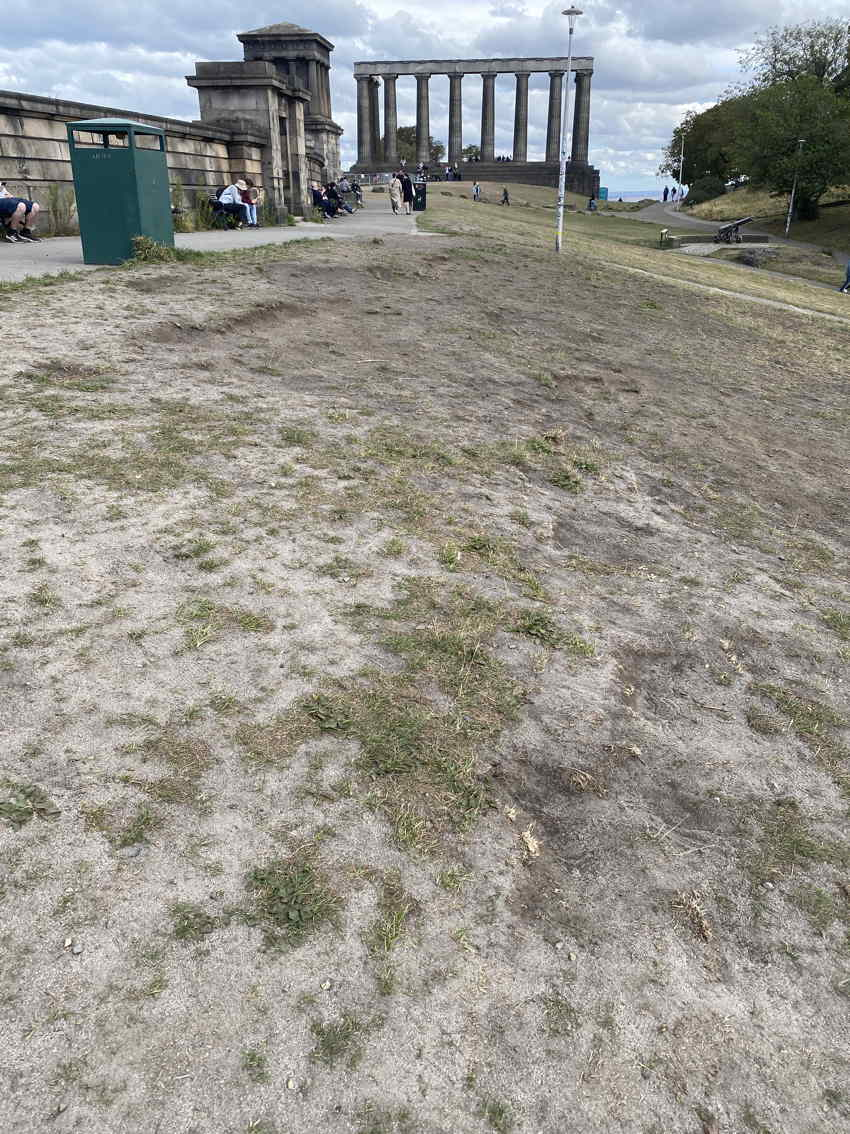
14

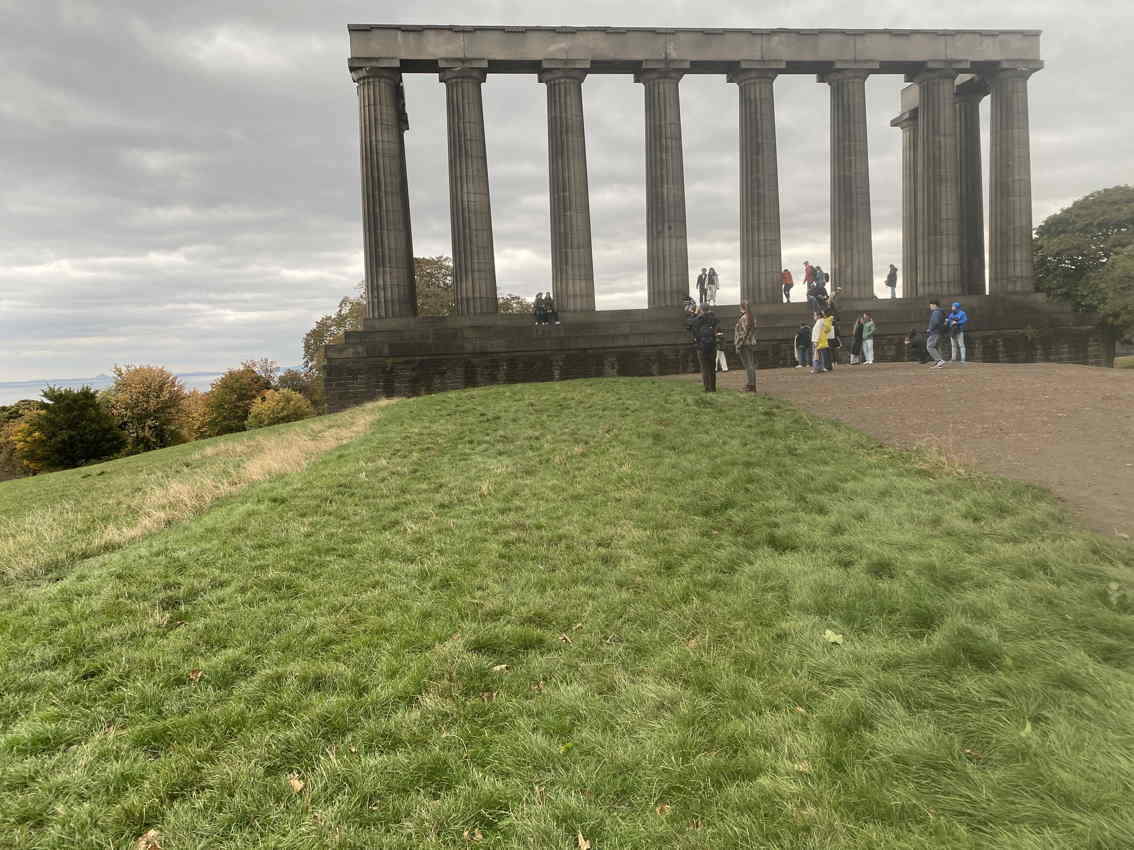
15

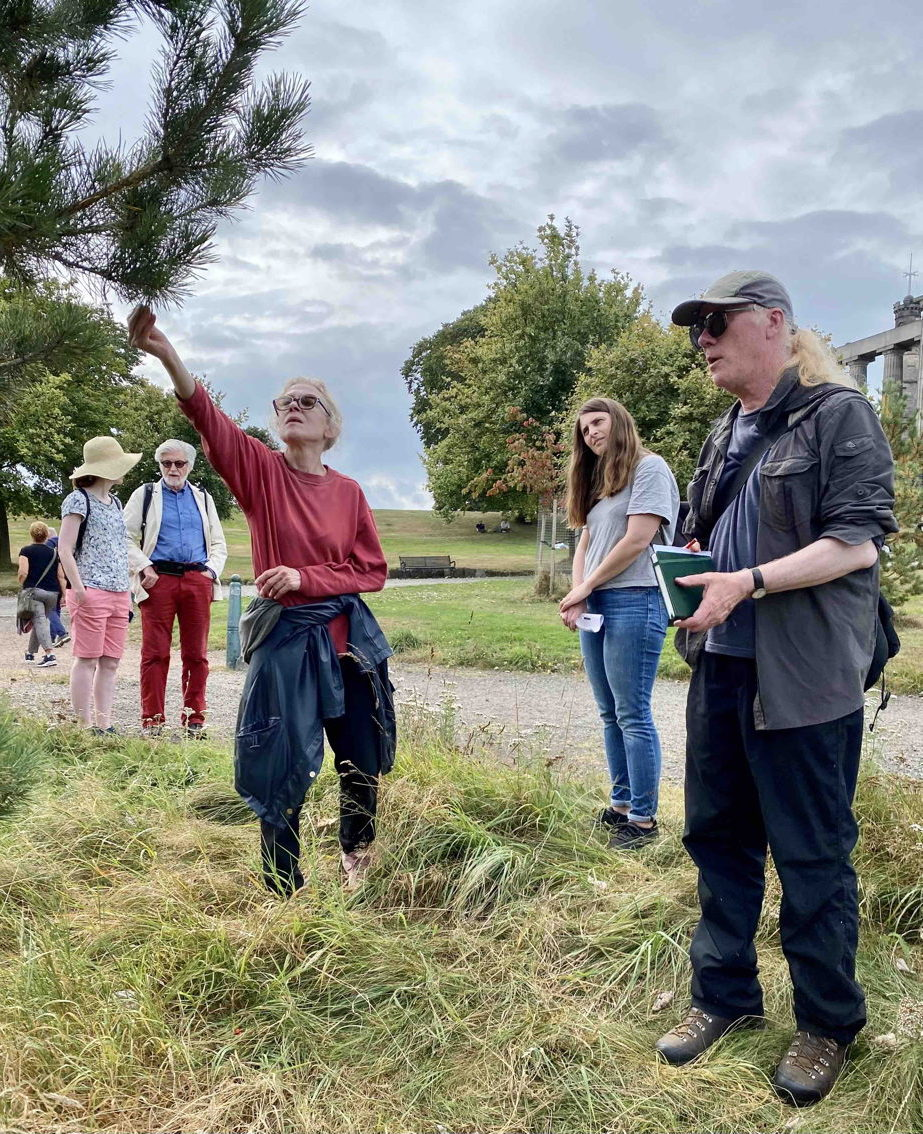
16

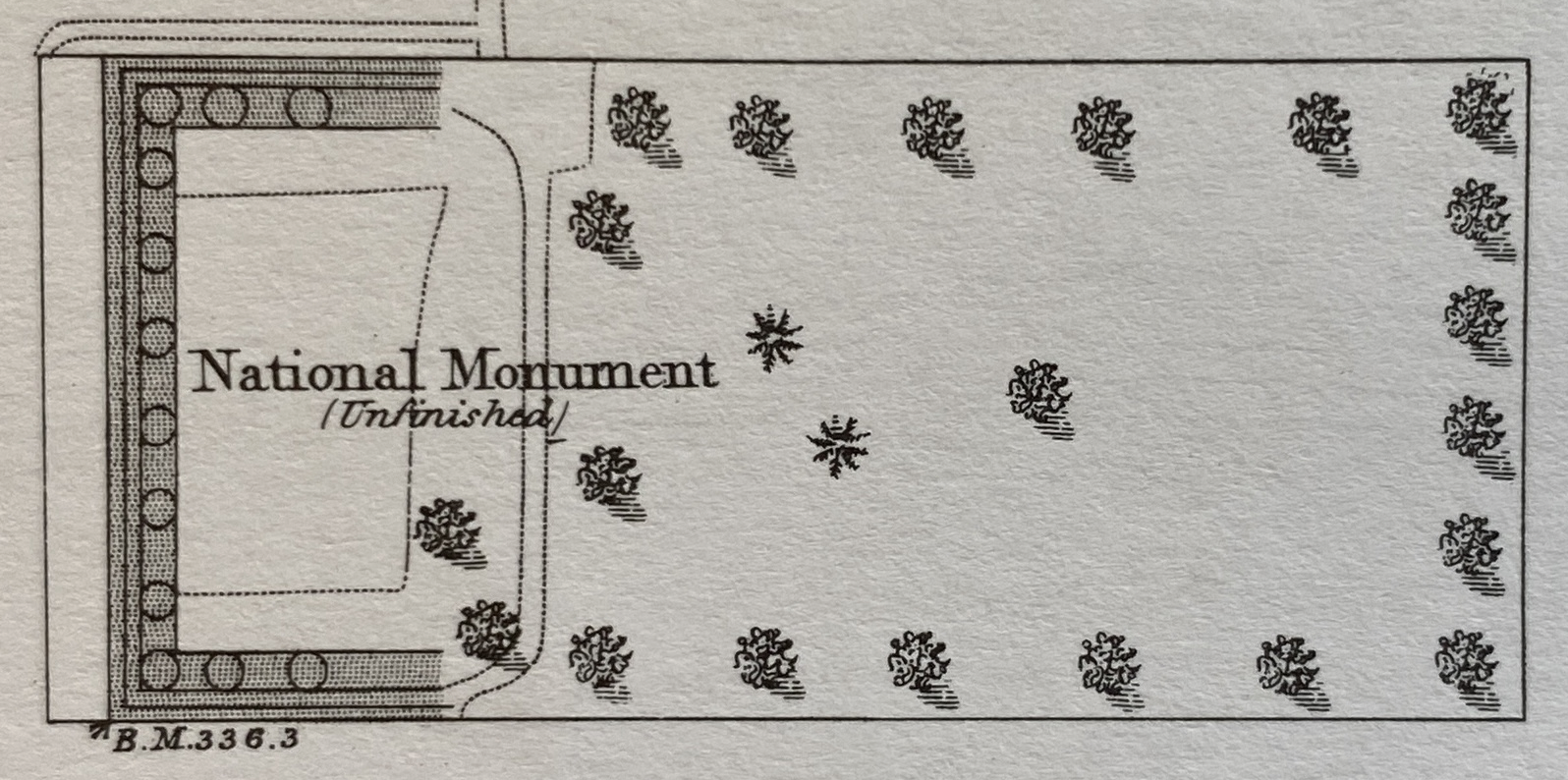
17

== See also ==
- Calton Hill
- Cockburn Association
- Edinburgh World Heritage
- Historic Environment Scotland
- London Road Gardens
- Old Royal High School
- Regent, Royal and Carlton Terrace Gardens
