= Carol Colburn Grigor =

American and British philanthropist (born 1944)

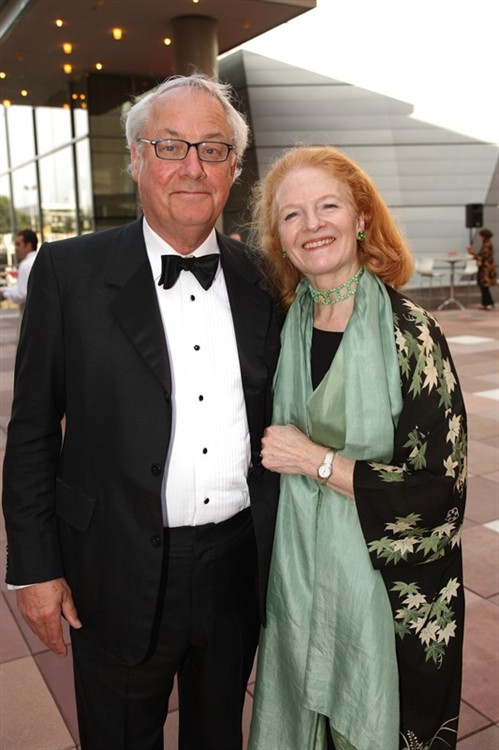
- Carol Colburn Grigor and Scottish film maker husband Murray Grigor in 2012
- Born: Carol Colburn; 1944 (age 81–82); United States
- Other name: Carol Colburn Hogel
- Known for: Philanthropist; pianist

Dame Carol Colburn Grigor DBE HonFRSE (née Colburn; formerly Hogel; born 1944) is an American and British philanthropist and former concert pianist resident in Ireland who has donated between $40 million and £100 million to the arts in Britain and Ireland.

Raised in Chicago, she was taught piano and recorder at school. She studied music at Indiana and Yale Universities. She played in chamber music concerts before marrying her first husband, Jens Hogel, whose work with the United Nations Development Fund took them both to Africa before they later settled in Scotland. Her father, Richard D. Colburn, was an entrepreneur who built a multimillion-dollar electrical company, Consolidated Electrical Distributors (CED), that now ranks the Colburn family as the 193rd richest in the US.

Richard Colburn was also a classical music enthusiast and amateur viola player. He was a director of the Los Angeles Philharmonic, the benefactor of the annual Colburn Celebrity Recitals, a co-founder of the Los Angeles Chamber Orchestra, and a generous backer of the Los Angeles Opera as well as other musical organizations in Los Angeles and worldwide. He founded the Colburn School of performing arts in Los Angeles.

The family trust donated to the arts and founded the Dunard Fund, which Colburn Grigor helps to run. The name Dunard derives from a house that she and her then husband owned in Aberfeldy, Scotland. The fund has donated a substantial amount of money to causes ranging from the Edinburgh International Festival, National Galleries of Scotland, National Library of Scotland and Britain's major opera companies. She serves on the board of the Colburn School, and in 2015 established an endowed piano chair with a $5 million gift. She is also the president of Colburn foundation.

She has been a patron of the Edinburgh International Festival, the London Philharmonic Orchestra, Scottish Opera and the National Galleries of Scotland. The Scottish Chamber Orchestra and the Royal Scottish National Orchestra have also benefited from her support and she made major contributions to a range of other UK arts organisations. At one stage, she performed in Edinburgh as a touring concert pianist. She was honored by being appointed as honorary vice-president of the Edinburgh International Festival in 2013.

Grigor pledged £40 million to a project to turn Edinburgh's Old Royal High School into a music school, rather than re-developing it as a hotel.

In 2019, she and her husband Murray Grigor moved their home from Scotland to Dublin, Ireland, due to changes in the UK tax laws. She lives at Merrion Square and has donated to a range of Irish organisations including music, architecture, heritage and environmental.

== Recognition and awards ==
She was appointed an honorary Commander of the Order of the British Empire (CBE) for her support for the arts. She was later elevated to honorary Dame Commander of the Order of the British Empire (DBE). She is a recipient of the Prince of Wales' medal for arts philanthropy and the Chevalier de l'Ordre des Arts et des Lettres. She was awarded a substantive damehood of the Order of the British Empire in the 2026 New Year Honours.

In 2018, she was elected an Honorary Fellow of the Royal Society of Edinburgh (Hon FRSE).

She was awarded the Carnegie Medal of Philanthropy in 2025.
