= Nicholas Daniel =

British oboist and conductor

- Born: 9 January 1962 (age 64)
- Genre: Classical
- Instrument: Oboe
- Years active: 1980–present
- Website: www.nicholasdaniel.co.uk

Nicholas Daniel OBE (born 9 January 1962) is a British oboist and conductor. In 2003 he was appointed artistic director of the Leicester International Music Festival.

== Education ==
He was educated at Salisbury Cathedral School and the Purcell School.

== Awards ==
Daniel won the BBC Young Musician of the Year Competition in 1980 and was awarded the 2011 Queen's Medal for Music., cited as having made "an outstanding contribution to the musical life of the nation". In 2016 his recording of concertos by Vaughan Williams and MacMillan was awarded the BBC Music Magazine Premiere Award.

He was appointed Officer of the Order of the British Empire (OBE) in the 2020 Birthday Honours for services to music.

== Teaching posts ==
Daniel was Professor of Oboe at the Guildhall School of Music and Drama for ten years, then in 1997 became Professor of Oboe and Conducting at the Indiana University School of Music. He then was invited to be Prince Consort Professor of Oboe at the Royal College of Music in London. In 2004, he was named Professor of Oboe at the Musikhochschule in Trossingen, Germany.

== Performing ensembles ==
Nicholas Daniel is a founding member of the Haffner Wind Ensemble and Britten Sinfonia, and formed a duo with pianist Julius Drake in 1981.

As Principal Oboe of Britten Sinfonia, Daniel has frequently appeared as a member of the orchestra and also as a soloist/director. In 2009 Britten Sinfonia released its first own label recording, which features Nicholas Daniel in John Tavener's Songs of the Sky.

In September 2021 Daniel was appointed as artistic director and principal conductor for the Orion Orchestra.

== Commissions ==
Daniel has commissioned and premiered many new works for the oboe, to increase its status as a solo instrument. Such works include:

- The Kingdom of Dreams by John Woolrich (1989)
- Double Concerto by Simon Bainbridge (1990)
- An Interrupted Endless Melody by Harrison Birtwistle (1991)
- First Grace of Light by Peter Maxwell Davies (1991)
- Helios by Thea Musgrave (1994)
- Oboe Concerto by John Woolrich (1996)
- Oboe Quintet by John Woolrich (1998)
- Oboe Concerto by Nigel Osborne (1998)
- Three Capriccios for solo oboe by John Woolrich (2001)
- Two's Company by Thea Musgrave (2005)
- The Fabric of Dreams by Michael Zev Gordon (2006)
- Kaleidoscopes by John Tavener (2006)
- Sorella by Rory Boyle (2007).
- Oboe Concerto by James MacMillan (2010).
- BEAK and WORM by Robin Haigh (2022)

== Recordings ==
Daniel has recorded many albums, both solo work and chamber music, such as:

- Alwyn oboe concerto
- Alwyn Chamber works
- Alwyn Chamber works vol 2
- Alwyn Orchestral works
- Arnold Orchestral works: Fantasia Conifer
- Berkeley oboe concerto
- Bliss Chamber works
- Finzi Orchestral works: Eclogue
- Finzi, Howells, Patterson works for oboe & piano
- Horovitz oboe concerto
- Elena Langer Landscape With Three People
- Martinu Sinfonia Concertante
- Moeran Fantasy Quartet
- Mozart Sinfonia Concertante in E flat
- Mozart Wind Concertos
- Mozart Chamber works
- Thea Musgrave Helios; Memento Vitae
- Strauss Sinfonia no 2; oboe concerto
- Woolrich The Ghost in the Machine
- French Chamber Music for Woodwinds
- French Oboe Sonatas
- Five Italian Oboe Concertos
- Oboe Alone
- Oboe Sonatas with Julius Drake
- Vaughan Williams and MacMillan oboe concertos
