= Murray Grigor =

Scottish writer, artist, filmmaker, architect and exhibition curator

Murray Grigor OBE
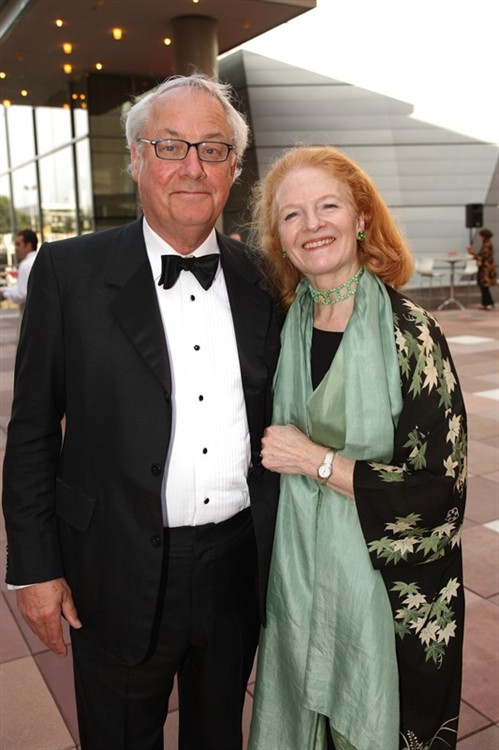
- Murray Grigor with Carol Colburn Grigor in 2012
- Born: 1939 (age 86–87); Inverness, Scotland
- Occupation: Film maker
- Years active: 1967–present
- Spouse: Barbara Grigor (1968–1994) Carol Grigor (2011–present)
- Children: Sarah Grigor (born 1970); Phoebe Grigor (born 1972)

William Alexander Murray Grigor OBE (born 1939) is a Scottish film-maker, writer, artist, exhibition curator and amateur architect who has served as director of the Edinburgh International Film Festival. He has made over 50 films with a focus on arts and architecture.

== Early life ==
Grigor was born in 1939 in Inverness, and graduated from St Andrews University. He started his career as a film editor at the BBC which he left in 1967 to become director of the Edinburgh International Film Festival. In 1968, he married Barbara Grigor, née Sternschein, a teacher of French and German, film maker, exhibition curator, and chairman of the Scottish Sculpture Trust with whom he had two daughters, Sarah, b 1970 and Phoebe, b 1972. Barbara Grigor died in 1994. Grigor married Carol Colburn Grigor née Colburn in 2011.

== Career ==
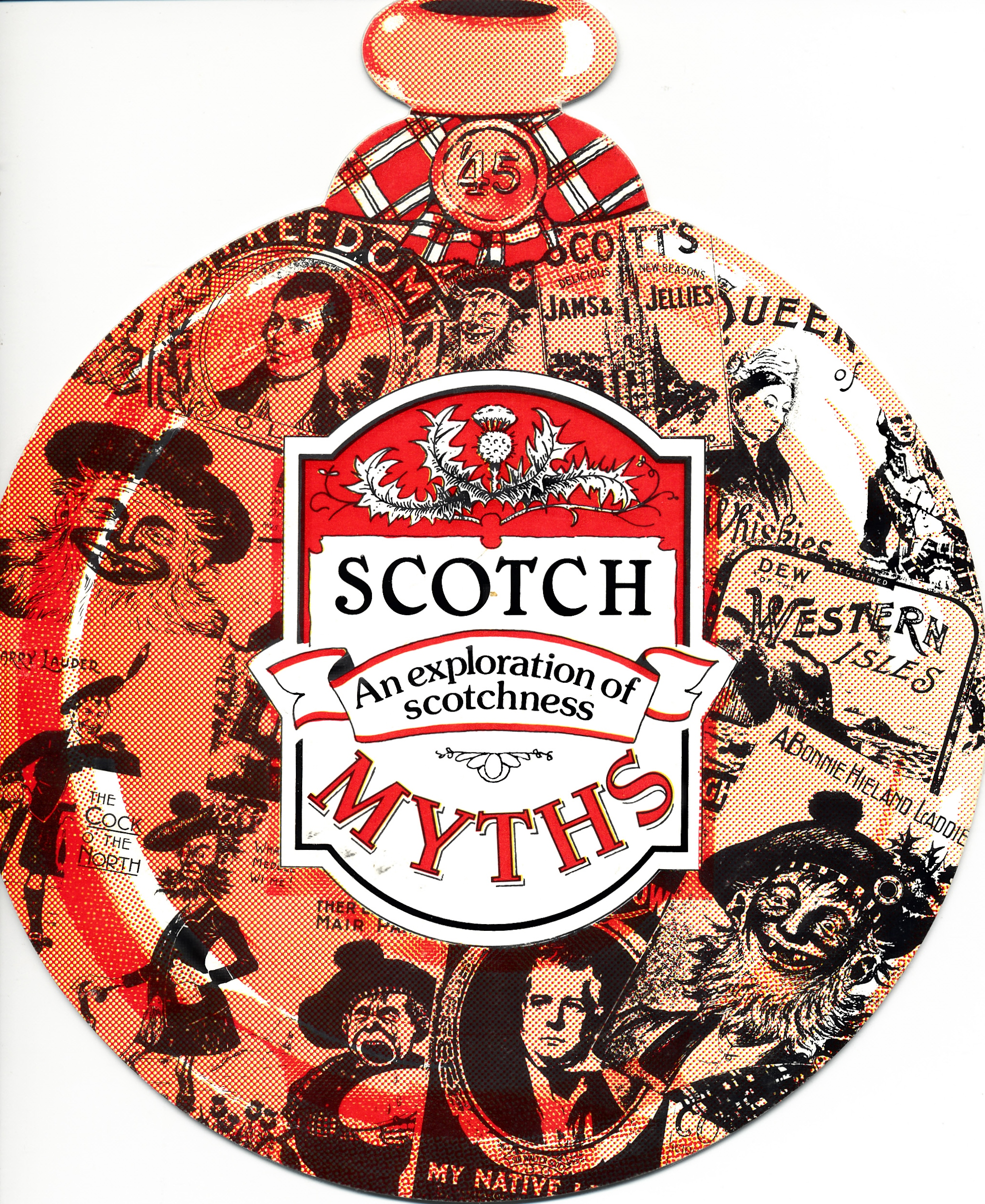
Programme for the Scotch Myths exhibition, August 1981

With his wife Barbara and Peter Rush, Grigor devised the Scotch Myths exhibition, which was mounted at the Crawford Centre at the University of St Andrews in the Spring of 1981 and went on to feature in the programme of the Edinburgh International Festival. Its exploration of popular representations of Scottish identity, notably Tartanry and the Kailyard, attracted much critical attention, influencing cultural and political debate in Scotland in the early 1980s. The exhibition inspired the three-day Scotch Reels event at the 1982 Edinburgh Film Festival, which explored representations of Scots and Scotland in cinema and television. Grigor contributed to an accompanying book of essays entitled Scotch Reels: Scotland in Cinema and Television edited by Colin McArthur. The success of the exhibition also led Channel 4 to commission Grigor to write and direct the film Scotch Myths which was screened at the Festival of Film and Television from the Celtic Countries held in Glasgow in March 1983.

Scotch Myths received a cold reception from Scotland's film establishment and with little prospect of securing Scottish funding for films that addressed cultural matters, Grigor shifted his focus to international, and particularly American subjects, in such as the 1986 landmark 8 part series Pride of Place with Robert A.M. Stern for the American television channel PBS. In 1987 he tried again with a Scottish subject, writing the screenplay for a feature-length film about the writer, adventurer and politician R.B. Cunninghame Graham, but he was unable to secure sufficient funding for its production. In 1997, he directed the PBS series "The Face of Russia" with James Billington, the Librarian of Congress. "Contemporary Days" on the British designers Robin and Lucienne Day for Design Onscreen of Denver Colorado, was premiered at the Glasgow Film Festival in February 2011. "Ever to Excel" - a feature documentary with Sir Sean Connery was funded in America to mark the 600th anniversary of the University of St Andrews for its scholarship endowment campaign, and had its British premiere at the 2012 Glasgow Film Festival. It was followed by sequel "Ever to Exceed' celebrating the achievements of St. Andrews' students, scholars and alumni. In 1976 he shot a video of Neil Young busking in Glasgow.

Grigor also worked as film producer and writer. Together with Barbara Grigor, he founded, in 1972, the film company Viz Ltd based in Inverkeithing, Scotland. Grigor has also written screenplays for all his films, and a number of exhibition catalogues to accompany his exhibitions. He was co-author of The Architects' Architect on Charles Rennie Mackintosh with Richard Murphy and Being a Scot with Sir Sean Connery, published in 2008 and which is now published in 5 languages. "Beatus – The Spanish Apocalypse" on the illuminated manuscripts of the Middle Ages on the Book of Revelation, was invited in competition to the 2015 Montréal Festival du Film sur L'Art – the 4th film Grigor has made in partnership with Hamid Shams, the American Director of Photography.

In 2008, Grigor produced seven film loops for Los Angeles' Hammer Gallery exhibition Between Earth and Heaven about the architecture of John Lautner, which coincided with the premiere of his documentary Infinite Space on the same subject.

== Appointments and awards ==
He was appointed, in 2007, as a member of the Scottish Broadcasting Commission.

Grigor is a fellow of the Royal Society of Arts, and was the first film maker to be made an Honorary Fellow of the Royal Incorporation of Architects in Scotland and the Royal Institute of British Architects. Grigor is Visiting Professor of Film Studies at the Anglia Ruskin University, from which he received, in 2010, an Honorary Doctor of Arts.

Grigor was appointed Officer of the Order of the British Empire (OBE) in the 2012 New Year Honours for services to architecture and the film industry.

== Selected filmography ==
Grigor has directed the following films.

Year	Title	Summary
1968	Mackintosh	Documentary about 20th century Scottish architect Charles Rennie Mackintosh
1970	Fettes	Documentary about activities and events at Fettes College, Edinburgh, including a visit by HM The Queen Mother
1972	Space and light	Documentary about the newly built St. Peter's Seminary, Cardross, by Scottish architects firm Gillespie, Kidd and Coia
1974	Clydescope	Documentary about the river Clyde, from Biggar to Brodick, with Scottish comedian Billy Connolly as guide
1974	Suilven Spring	Documentary about the Northwest of Scotland seen through the eyes of a young couple taking a Spring break
1975	The Hand of Adam	Documentary about 18th century Scottish architect Robert Adam
1975	Steel upon the Sward	Documentary about works of the three sculptors Gerald Laing, Gavin Scobie and Andrew Mylius
1977	Cumbernauld Hit	A James-Bond type fiction film about an evil woman's plans to 'hi-jack' the New Town of Cumbernauld.
1982	Sean Connery's Edinburgh	Documentary about Edinburgh presented by Scottish actor Sean Connery
1983	Scotch Myths	An exploration of the myths within which Scots have been and continue to be constructed
1983	(Portrait of an Artist:) The Architecture of Frank Lloyd Wright	Documentary about 19th/20th century American architect Frank Lloyd Wright featuring the architect's granddaughter, the actress Anne Baxter
1984	Pride of Place	8-part one-hour TV series documentary about American architecture
1990	The Why?sman – In Pursuit of the Question Mark	Documentary on the self-styled Scul?tor George Wyllie, artist, playwright, poet and Pataphysician. It features his Straw Locomotive (1987) and the Paper Boat, as a requiem for Glasgow's once-great industrial prowess. It also features Wyllie's performance piece, A Day Down a Goldmine, with Bill Paterson, an eerie forecast on the collapse of the banking system.
1992	The Architecture of Carlo Scarpa	Documentary about 20th century Italian architect Carlo Scarpa, presented by Scottish architect Richard Murphy
1995	In Search of Clarity: The Architecture of Gwathmey Siegel	Documentary about 20th century American architects firm Gwathmey Siegel & Associates Architects
1999	Nineveh on the Clyde: the Architecture of Alexander "Greek" Thomson	Documentary about 19th century Scottish architect Alexander "Greek" Thomson
2001	The Work of Angels	Documentary on The Book of Kells, Director of photography, Seamus McGarvey, Producer Louis Lentin for RTE, Ireland and ABC TV, Australia.
2005	Maggie's Centres	Documentary about Maggie's Centres, cancer care centres in Britain, inspired by Maggie Keswick Jencks and built by celebrated architects
2005	Sir John Soane: an English architect, an American legacy	Documentary about 18th century English architect Sir John Soane and his influence on 20th century American architects
2011	Contemporary Days: the Designs of Lucienne and Robin Day	Documentary about the British designers Lucienne and Robin Day
2012	Ever to Excel + "Ever to Exceed" with Hamid Shams	Feature-length documentary to mark the 600th anniversary of the University of St Andrews with Sean Connery. Director of photography Hamid Shams, Music composed by Rory Boyle.
