= Old Royal High School =

19th-century neoclassical Scottish building

Coordinates: 55°57′13″N 3°10′49″W

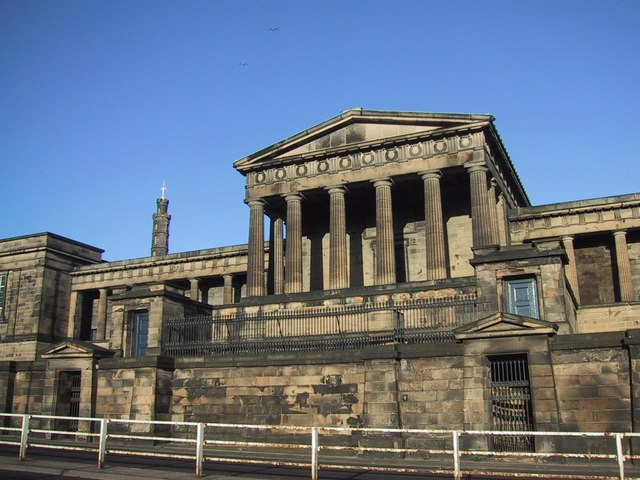
The Old Royal High School as seen from Regent Road

The Old Royal High School, also known as New Parliament House, is a 19th-century neoclassical building on Calton Hill in the city of Edinburgh. The building was constructed for the use of the city's Royal High School, and gained its alternative name as a result of a proposal in the 1970s for it to house a devolved Scottish Assembly.

After the Royal High School relocated in 1968, the building became available and was refurbished to accommodate a new devolved legislature for Scotland. However, the 1979 devolution referendum failed to provide sufficient backing for a devolved assembly. Its debating chamber was later used for meetings of the Scottish Grand Committee, a House of Commons body consisting of members with Scottish constituencies. Subsequently, the building has been used by various departments of Edinburgh City Council.

With the passage of the Scotland Act 1998 and the introduction of Scottish devolution in 1999, the Old Royal High School was again mooted as a potential home for the new Scottish Parliament. Eventually, however, the Scotland Office decided to site the new legislature in a purpose-built structure opposite Holyrood Palace.

A number of uses have been suggested for the building, including a home for a Scottish National Photography Centre or a site for a Scottish Central Bank in the event of independence. In 2015, Edinburgh City Council, which currently owns the building, initiated a project to lease it to be used as a luxury hotel. However, in 2021, it was announced that the lease to the hotel developers had been cancelled, and a new use was being sought.

== Construction and Royal High School ==
The Royal High School in 1829

The A-listed building was erected for the Royal High School between 1826 and 1829 on the south face of Calton Hill as part of Edinburgh's Acropolis, at a cost to the Town Council of £34,000. Of this £500 was given by King George IV "as a token of royal favour towards a School, which, as a royal foundation, had conferred for ages incalculable benefits on the community". It was designed in a neo-classical Greek Doric style by Thomas Hamilton, who modelled the portico and Great Hall on the Hephaisteion of Athens. Paired with St. George's Hall, Liverpool, as one of the "two finest buildings in the kingdom" by Alexander Thomson in 1866, it has been praised as "the architect's supreme masterpiece and the finest monument of the Greek revival in Scotland".

The school relocated to larger modern premises at Barnton in 1968.

== Scottish devolution ==
The building was considered by the Scottish Office as a home for the Scottish Assembly.The School's Great Hall was converted to a debating chamber prior to the failed devolution referendum in 1979. In 1994, Edinburgh City Council reacquired the complex from the Scottish Office for £1.75m.

Following the successful referendum in 1997 that led to the formation of the Scottish Parliament, the Secretary of State for Scotland, Donald Dewar, accepted an alternative proposal to erect a new Parliament building at Holyrood, reportedly due to concern that the Old Royal High School had become a "nationalist shibboleth". Critics also contended that the Calton Hill site was relatively inaccessible, lacked sufficient office space, and would be difficult to secure against a terrorist attack.

The Under-Secretary of State, Lord Sewel, remarked of this decision: "Many people understandably assumed that the Old Royal High School building on Calton Hill would be the automatic choice for the site. As I say, that is perfectly understandable given that it was prepared for a similar purpose, to house a parliament in the 1970s. During the wasted years of the previous Administration, it remained a symbol of hope in Scotland. Clearly, there is great sentimental attachment to it in the hearts of the people of Scotland. However, time has moved on since then, in much the same way as our vision of a parliament has evolved."

The nearby Governor's House on Calton Hill had also been proposed as a residence for the First Minister of Scotland instead of Bute House in Edinburgh's New Town.

== Prospective and future uses ==
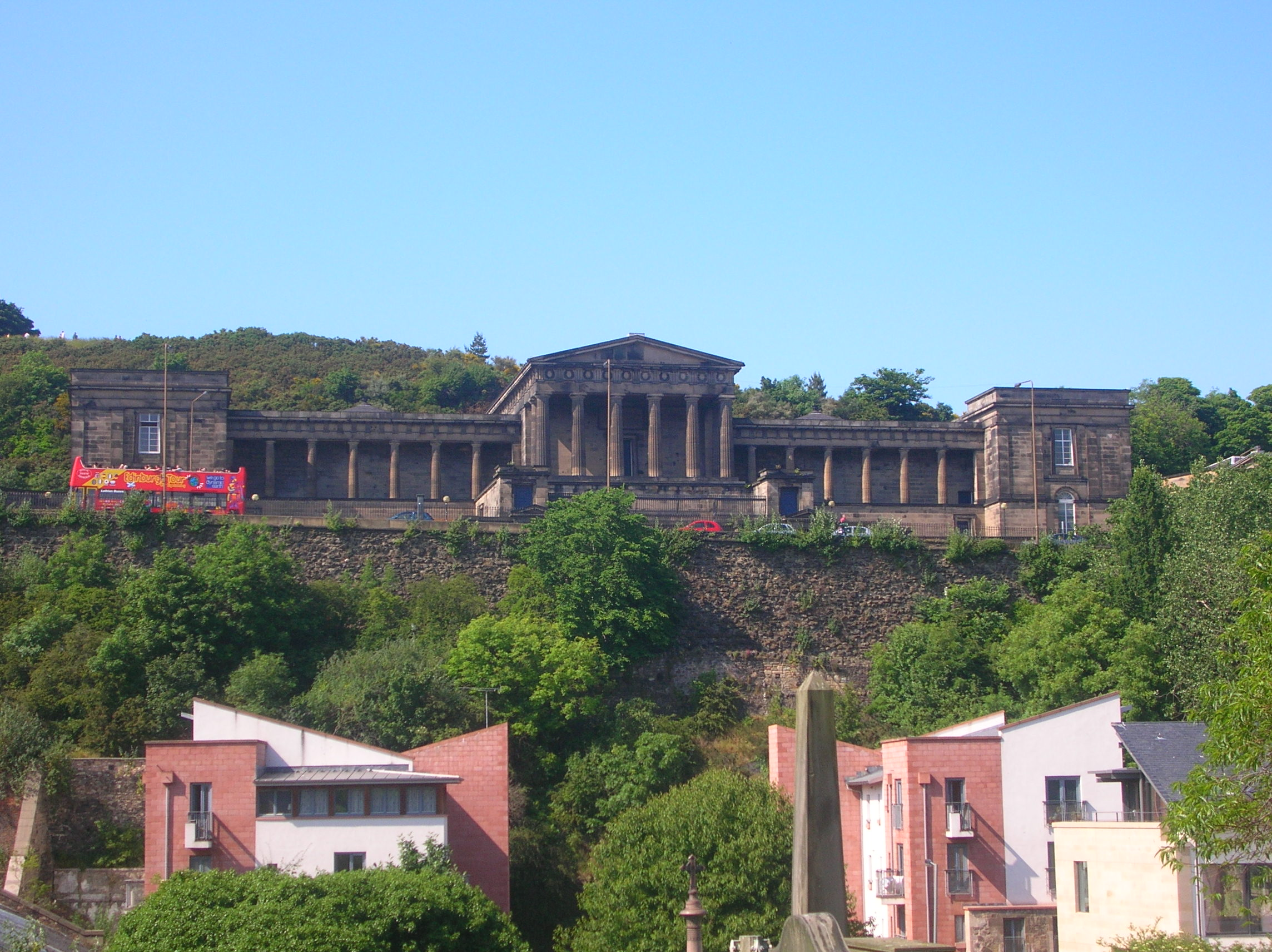
The Old Royal High School

In 2004, the council gave its support to a plan by former royal press secretary Michael Shea to use the school as a Scottish National Photography Centre at a cost of £20 million. The proposal failed to gain the support of the Heritage Lottery Fund, seen as a key funder.

In 2010, the council announced a plan to use the building as a hotel and public art gallery, described as an "arts hotel". The cost was estimated at £35 million, and Duddingston House Properties (DHP) were awarded the project to prepare a design. DHP were awarded a conditional 125-year lease with the council retaining ownership of the building.

In 2015, another proposal was brought forward to use the building as a luxury hotel at an estimated cost of £55 million. The plan, put forward by DHP and Urbanist Hotels, involved the construction of two additional six-story wings on either side of the building in a modern architectural style. The hotel would be managed by Rosewood Hotels & Resorts. It was opposed by Scotland's national heritage agency Historic Scotland, Edinburgh World Heritage, Edinburgh's civic trust, the Cockburn Association, the Architectural Heritage Society of Scotland, the council's planning department, and over 1,700 people who sent in objections. The Royal High School Preservation Trust also put forward an alternative plan costing over £25 million in 2015 to use the building to house St Mary's Music School. The headteacher of St Mary's, Dr Kenneth Taylor, estimated the cost in the region of £35 million. An American philanthropist, Carol Colburn Grigor, pledged to underwrite this proposal through the Dunard Fund. In 2015, the Dunard Fund gave the Royal High School Preservation Trust £1.5 million held in a restricted reserve which can be released only for expenditure connected to purchasing the building. The Dunard Fund has the power to appoint 5 of the 6 trustees of the Royal High School Preservation Trust. The Fund has two major projects it intends to support and, "therefore, as a matter of strategy, the trustees are retaining a substantial part of available funds at present." Edinburgh City Council rejected the hotel plans in December 2015, following which the developers appealed the decision to the Scottish Government in 2016 but then put the appeal on hold and submitted an alternative reduced plan. Edinburgh Council accepted plans for the St. Mary's Music School in 2016 but the hotel developers said their 2010 contract gave them sole rights to the site until 2022. Over 3,000 people submitted objections to the alternative hotel plan put forward by the developers Again, the revised scheme was opposed by Scotland's national heritage agency, by this date Historic Environment Scotland. In August 2017, Edinburgh Council rejected the alternative hotel plan. A public inquiry to determine the future use of the building opened on 4 September 2018, with Reporters appointed from the DPEA, the Governments Planning and Environmental Appeals Agency. During that inquiry, the Director of Edinburgh World Heritage admitted to Photoshopping a picture of the proposed hotel development that was shown to the public at a Save the Old Royal High School meeting at Central Hall in Tollcross in March 2017. That meeting was held with the support of both Edinburgh World Heritage and the Cockburn Association. The image showed the proposed extensions to the school in elevation, appearing larger than in images detailed in the submitted plans, indicating the proposals would have a greater impact on Calton Hill than was put forward by the developers. In October 2020, following a recommendation from the DPEA Reporters, the Scottish Government dismissed both appeals. In 2021, the lease to the hotel developers was cancelled, and Edinburgh Council invited proposals for other uses.

=== National Centre for Music development ===
In July 2024, it was announced that the Royal High School Preservation Trust had secured funding from the Dunard Foundation to build a national music centre on the site. In January 2025, the National Lottery Heritage Fund awarded an initial grant of £437,046 for the development and put aside a further £4,562,147. In January 2026, it was announced that a £47M contract for the construction of Scotland’s National Centre for Music within the former High School building had been awarded to the firm Robertson Construction. The Royal High School Preservation Trust, is now taking the project forward. Led by Chair Carol Nimmo, whose previous work experience is as a Yoga teacher. The project continues to have spiralling costs, now estimated at £75 million, as of 2026,,https://www.heraldscotland.com/opinion/26231976.edinburghs-75m-national-centre-music-can-pay-way/ and still has a funding shortfall amid questions about its long term viability, if it does not receive even more public funding. The building and its links to slavery and colonialism are expected to be discussed once open, with regard to the original subscription for the build and alumni but it is unclear whether the Trust will do this. Many former elite schools had links to a slavery past . Guardian
