= Michael Zev Gordon =

British composer of Jewish ancestry (born 1963)

- Born: 1963 (age 62–63); London, England, United Kingdom
- Genres: Classical
- Occupation: Composer

Michael Zev Gordon (born 1963, London) is a British composer of Jewish descent.

A past oboe player, Gordon studied composition at King's College, Cambridge with Robin Holloway, and subsequently with Oliver Knussen and John Woolrich, and in Italy with Franco Donatoni. He was a composition pupil of Louis Andriessen from 1989 to 1990. His work has often involved a deep engagement with the subject of memory, with the use of quotation of, or allusion to, other music, sometimes explicit, sometimes more buried. He has himself also spoken of his work in terms of 'turbulence seeking serenity'. Stylistically, this could be seen in the relationship between tonal and more dissonant materials in his music.

Key works include the oboe concerto The Fabric of Dreams (2006), premiered by Nicholas Daniel and the Britten Sinfonia, The Impermanence of Things for piano, ensemble and electronics (2009), a London Sinfonietta commission, Allele for 40 voices (2010), a project involving the science of genetics, Bohortha for large orchestra (2012), a BBC Symphony Orchestra commission, Seize the Day (2016), a Birmingham Contemporary Music Group Sound Investment commission, his Violin Concerto (2017), a BBC Symphony Orchestra commission, Touch (1990), a virtuosic piano piece written for the Indonesian virtuoso pianist and composer Ananda Sukarlan and Raising Icarus (2022), a chamber opera for six singers and eight instrumentalists, premiered at the Birmingham Rep.

Gordon was the recipient of the Prix Italia 2004 for his composition for radio A Pebble in the Pond, and two British Composer Awards, for Allele and for This Night for choir and solo cello (2009), a commission for the choir of King's College, Cambridge. He has taught at the universities of Durham, Southampton and at the Royal College of Music. Since 2012 he has been Professor of Composition at the University of Birmingham. His music is published by Wise Music and Composer's Edition.

== Worklist ==
- Raising Icarus (100mins; chbr op; 2022)
- Violin Concerto (23mins; solo vn, orch; 2017)
- Seize the Day (9mins; fl/picc, cl, vn, va, vc, pf, perc; 2016)
- In the Middle of Things (14mins; vn, vc, pf; 2015)
- Diary Pieces: Summer 2015 (7mins; pf; 2015)
- Homecoming (10mins; pf; 2014)
- Sehnsucht (10mins; fl/picc, cl, va, vc, pf, vibr; 2014)
- Into the Dark (19mins; mez, pf, elecs; 2014)
- The Gleam of Hidden Skies (15mins; ten, hn, str, 2013)
- Bohortha (Seven Pieces for Orchestra) (20mins; 2012)
- Firm Foundations (6mins; orch; 2012)
- Glass Mountain (10mins; b cl, vn, va, vc, acc; 2012)
- Sanctuary (8mins; sax qt; 2012)
- Allele (20mins; 40 voices; 2010)
- Eclipsis (7mins; hpschd, elecs, 2010)
- Imaginary Landscapes (8mins; ob, perc; 2010)
- Seven Pastorales for Solo Oboe (12mins; 2009–10)
- Joshi's Dance (3mins; vn, pf; 2009) (ABRSM)
- The Impermanence of Things (35mins; pf, large ens, elecs; 2009)
- Mandelstam Settings (25mins, mez, pf; 2009)
- Laid Bare (4mins; pf; 2008)
- Roseland (7mins; vc, pf; 2008)
- summer fallow (10mins; choir; 2007)
- This Night (14mins; choir, vc; 2007)
- Oboe Concerto: The Fabric of Dreams (30mins; solo ob, chbr orch; 2006)
- Fragments of a Diary (13mins; cl, vn, pf; 2005)
- Of Here and Elsewhere (9mins; hp; 2005)
- Resolution (8mins; 2 perc; 2005)
- Three Short Pieces for String Quartet (10mins; 2005)
- A Pebble in the Pond (45mins; work for radio; 2003-4; arr. (30") narrator, cl, vn, db, acc, pf; 2009)
- There Always (10mins; viol consort; 2003; arr. str orch; 2006)
- On Memory: 12 Pieces for Piano (40mins; 2003-4) [NMC D144, Zolinsky]
- Crystal Clear (3mins; pf; 2003) (ABRSM)
- In veritate (6mins; choir; 2003)
- On the Other Hand: a new tango (5mins; vn, db, acc, pf, gui 2003)
- A Small Folly (4mins; cl, va, pf, perc; 2002)
- Three Rabbinical Sayings (8mins; sop, db; 2002; arr. sop, vc; 2007)
- Ein Morgenblatt (5mins; vn, va, vc, pf, vibr; 2001)
- Bells, Lachrimae and Stillness (13mins; gui; 2000)
- ...by the edge of the forest of desires (17mins: fl, cl, vn, va, vc, pf, perc; 2000)
- Plain Hunting (8mins; orch; 2000)
- Still Hunting (4mins; music box; 2000)
- Psalm 150 (6mins; choir; 1999)
- Song (30mins; sop, ten, high voices; 2 fl, ob, ca, vc, hp; 1999)
- Barcarola (10mins; vn, hn, pf; 1998)
- Grace (4mins; vn, pf; 1998) (Faber)
- High Ground (4mins; pf; 1998) (ABRSM)
- A Mermaid Sings (5mins; ob, va, hp; 1997)
- And I Will Betroth You (5mins; choir; 1997) (Faber)
- Jubilate (6mins; choir, org; 1997)
- Two Dances (8mins; b cl, trombone, db, pf, perc; 1997)
- Dolce (4mins; desc rec, pf; 1996)
- Gravity and Grace II (11mins; vc, pf; 1996)
- Red Sea (35mins; choir, wind ens; 1996–2002)
- Gravity and Grace I (10mins; fl, cl, va, hp; 1995)
- Far Away (4mins; pf; 1995) (ABRSM)
- Thirteen Ways (20mins; sop, vc, db, perc, hp; 1995)
- False Relations (10mins; vn, pf; 1994)
- String Quartet (20mins; 1993)
- There We Sat Down (10mins: fl, cl, va, hp; 1992)
- There We Sat Down III (5mins; choir; 1992)
- Music For Andries (9mins; org; 1991)
- nine birds (rising) (6mins; choir; 1991)
- no time ago... (8mins; sop, fl/picc, cl, alt sax, tpt, perc, vn, vc; 1990)
- Touch (8mins; pf; 1990)
- The Path To Pen-y-gent (10mins; pf; 1988)
- Magnificat and Nunc Dimittis (7mins; men's voices; 1983/4)
