= Rory Boyle =

Scottish composer

Rory Boyle is a Scottish composer and currently Professor of Composition at the Royal Conservatoire of Scotland

== Early life and education ==
Boyle was born in Ayr, Scotland on 9 March 1951. His father was a Major in the Argyll and Sutherland Highlanders and his mother a very talented amateur pianist and accordionist. His parents separated when he was 5 years old, and he and his sister were brought up by their mother, firstly in Edinburgh and then on a farm in Stirlingshire. He was a chorister at St. George’s Chapel, Windsor and then won a music bursary to Eton College.

== Career ==
Encouraged by his music teacher Boyle studied composition with Frank Spedding at the Royal Scottish Academy of Music and Drama (now The Royal Conservatoire of Scotland). He also studied piano (with Lawrence Glover), organ (with George McPhee) and harpsichord (with Andrew Davis who, at the time, was associate conductor of the BBC Scottish Symphony Orchestra) during his studies there.

He then went on to win a Caird Scholarship to study privately with Lennox Berkeley in London. As the conductor Nicholas Cleobury wrote in the 1998 Proms programme, “Boyle chose his teachers well: Spedding encouraged his individual voice; Berkeley reduced wastage and honed his orchestration”.

Whilst still a student at the RSAMD Boyle won the BBC Scottish Composers’ Prize with his first orchestral score and further important awards followed. These included two Royal Philharmonic Prizes, as well as the Zaiks Prize in the International Competition set up in memory of Kazimierz Serocki, one of the leading figures in the Polish avant garde, for his orchestral score Winter Music which was premièred in Cracow in 1987.

His list of works covers most genres and he has received commissions from many societies, festivals and organisations. He has also written for many leading performers including Evelyn Glennie ( Marimba Concerto ), Michael Chance ( Lord Lundy ), Nicholas Daniel ( Oboe Concerto – Sorella ), David Hubbard ( Bassoon Concerto – That Blessed Wood ), Fine Arts Brass Quintet ( Giochi di Sospiri and Elegy for the Black Bitch – nominated for a British Composer Award in 2005), and Karen Cargill ( Watching Over You ).

He has collaborated with several writers, including Vikram Seth ( 8 Beastly Tales ), Richard Stilgoe ( Mine Host ), and Dilys Rose ( Kaspar Hauser and Watching over You ).

Boyle has written for emerging artists at the start of their careers – the pianist James Willshire has premièred several of his works and recorded much of Boyle’s piano music on a critically acclaimed CD. He has also written several pieces for the young clarinettist Fraser Langton including the solo piece, Burble , which was nominated for a British Composer Award in 2012.

He has also written four operas for children, and in 1998 the National Youth Orchestra of Scotland’s tour programme included Capriccio , which was performed at venues including the Concertgebouw, Amsterdam and the London Proms.

In 2006 Boyle won a Creative Scotland Award to enable him to write an opera with a libretto by the Scottish writer and poet Dilys Rose on the subject of the nineteenth century feral child, Kaspar Hauser. The opera ( Kaspar Hauser, Child of Europe ) was premiered at the Royal Conservatoire of Scotland to critical acclaim in March 2010 and, later that year, won for Boyle a British Composer Award in the Stage category at the annual BASCA (British Association of Songwriters Composer and Authors) ceremony in London. The citation of the judging panel read “A very accomplished score: a powerful and disturbing story told with theatrical flair, dramatic pacing and excellent characterisation. The music flows in an uninhibited and unselfconscious stream”. In April 2012 a second production in association with the Hochschule fur Musik Nurnberg received performances in Germany and Scotland.

== Teaching ==
Boyle has held various teaching posts in England and Scotland. From 1979 to 1988 he was the Director of Music at Walhampton School, Lymington, and from 1988 to 2000, he was the Director of Music at Malvern College in Worcestershire. Since 2000, he has been a tutor at the Royal Conservatoire of Scotland and in 2013 he was made a Professor of Composition there.

== Film ==
Boyle has scored several television documentaries and has also worked with the director Murray Grigor writing the music for both Ever To Excel , which was made in 2012 to mark 600 years of St Andrews University, with a narration by Sean Connery, and Beatus, The Spanish Apocalypse , premiered in New York in 2014, which explores the corpus of illuminated and illustrated medieval manuscripts based on the 8th century apocalyptic commentary by the monk, Saint Beatus of Liebana.

== Selected works ==
=== Orchestral ===
- Winter Music (1986)
- Concerto for Marimba & Orchestra (1992)
- Capriccio (1995)
- Auld Nick’s Dance Tunes Vol. 6 (2001) flute & string orchestra
- Sorella (2008) concerto for oboe & orchestra
- That Blessed Wood (2012) concerto for bassoon & orchestra

=== Chamber ===
- Cinderella (1990) narrator, wind quintet & piano
- 4 Dance Preludes (1991) for viola and piano
- Giochi di Sospiri (1992) brass quintet
- Four Ways to Play Reels (1997) wind quintet
- Lament (1999) violin & piano
- Phaethon’s Dancing Lesson (2002) piano trio
- Night’s Music (2004) ensemble
- Behemoths (2006) wind ensemble
- 3 Islay Sketches (2006) for violin and viola
- Tallis’ Light (2011) brass quintet & organ
- Dramatis Personae (2012) clarinet & piano
- Di Tre Re e io (2015) clarinet, viola & piano

=== Brass Band ===
- Muckle Flugga (2013)

=== Opera ===
- Augustine (1975) children’s opera
- The Ghost of Hamish Prong (2000) children’s opera
- Kaspar Hauser, the Child of Europe (2007)

=== Vocal/choral ===
- Vigils (1971) soprano, clarinet & piano
- Passion Canticles (1981) SATB & organ
- Two Love Lyrics (1984) counter-tenor & lute
- Ceremony after a Fire-raid (2004) soprano & trumpet
- A Handful of Leaves (2008) mezzo-soprano, flute & piano
- His Name is Time (2011) SATB & cello
- Watching Over You (2014) mezzo-soprano & small ensemble

=== Solo Instrumental ===
- Toccata (1976) organ
- Sonata (1991) piano
- Reeling (2001) piano
- Lullabies for Daft Jamie (2003) guitar
- Touch (2008) flute
- Such Sweet Sorrow (2009) viola
- Burble (2011) clarinet
- “5” (2013) piano
