= Edinburgh World Heritage =

Edinburgh World Heritage (EWH) is an independent charity in Edinburgh, Scotland established in 1999. It is tasked with conserving, enhancing and promoting Edinburgh's World Heritage Site "Old and New Towns of Edinburgh", which was designated in 1995. It was created through donations from the City of Edinburgh Council and Historic Scotland. The EWH has worked on over 1,500 projects across Edinburgh in the areas of conservation, learning, and planning. Some of these projects include restoring Edinburgh's historic graveyards, original street lighting, and monuments.

== History ==
By the 1960s, parts of the New Town of Edinburgh were in poor condition and in risk of being demolished. In 1971, the Edinburgh New Town Conservation Committee was formed to give grants to home owners for repairs. In 1985, the Edinburgh Old Town Committee for Conservation and Renewal, later the Edinburgh Old Town Renewal Trust, was formed with an emphasis on stimulating social and economic regeneration. In 1999, the two organizations were merged.

== Melville monument ==
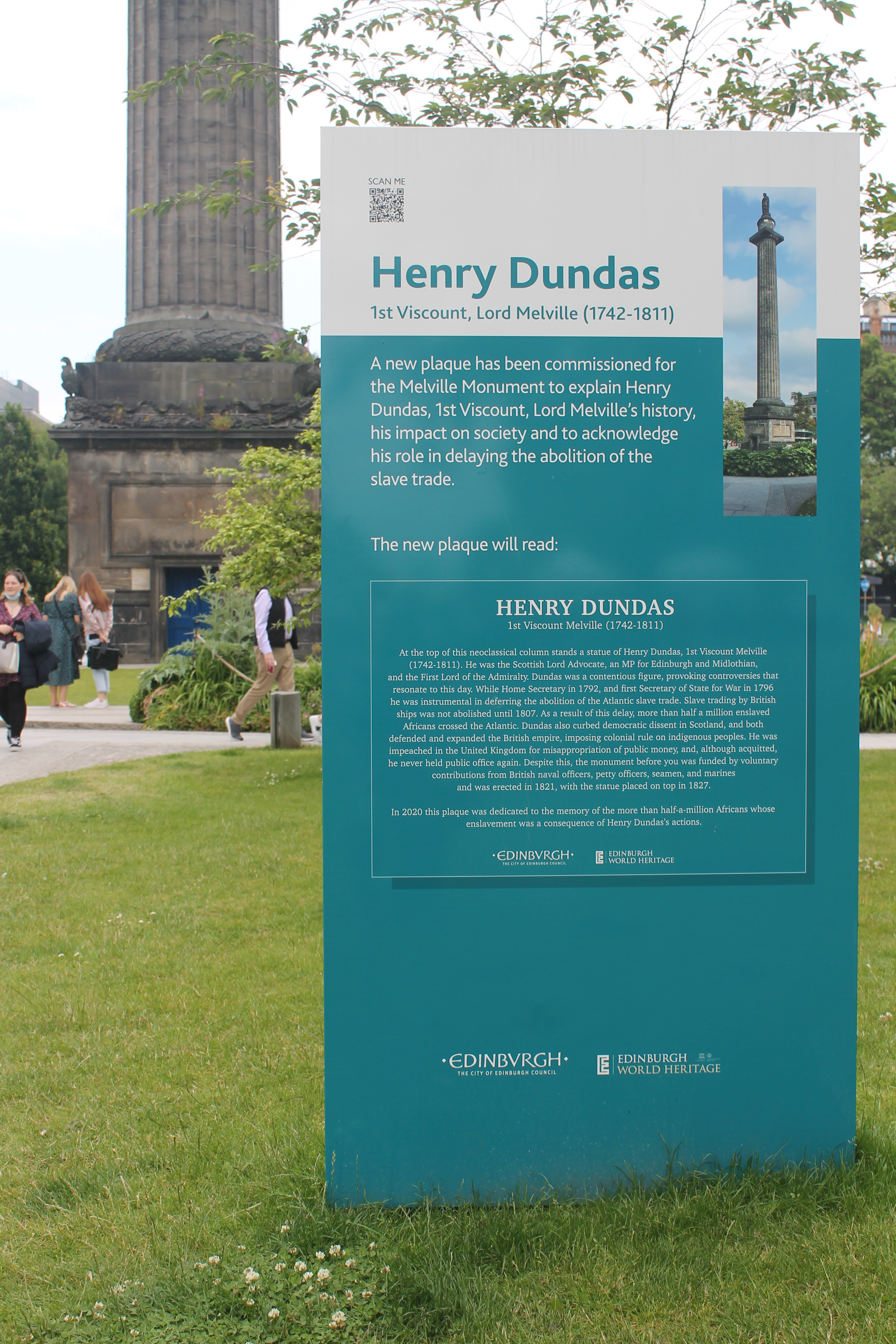
A temporary plaque for the Melville Monument placed in 2020 acknowledging Dundas' participation in the slave trade.

In 2008, the Melville Monument in St Andrew Square was restored as part of the Twelve Monuments Project, a joint initiative of Edinburgh World Heritage and the City of Edinburgh Council. In August 2020, EWH were the Agents in a planning application to erect a plaque on the monument. The plaque was intended to honour victims of slavery whose enslavement was connected to Henry Dundas, 1st Viscount Melville. A descendant criticised the characterisation of Dundas as 'biased', 'defamatory' and 'historically inaccurate'.

== See also ==
- Calton Hill Conservation Trust
