= International Journal of Public Theology =

International Journal of Public Theology (IJPT) is a peer-reviewed academic journal that investigates the notion and practice of public theology. From its founding in 2007 until 2017, the journal was edited by Sebastian Kim from Fuller Theological Seminary. William Storrar served as the first Chair of the Editorial Board, he was followed by Elaine Graham. Since 2024 Dion Forster from the Vrije Universiteit Amsterdam and Stellenbosch University serves as the Chair of the Editorial Board. Clive Pearson of Charles Sturt University, was the editor from 2017 to 2023. Since 2023, Rudolf von Sinner from the Pontifical Catholic University of Paraná has served as the Editor in Chief. David Moe, of Yale University, has been book review editor since 2020.

== Background ==
Founded in 2007, together with the Global Network for Public Theology, IJPT was established by a group of public theologians active in public discourse in the United Kingdom, such as Duncan B. Forrester of the Centre for Theology and Public Issues, Elaine Graham of Manchester University and Steven Payne of York University. William Storrar, founding chair of the journal's editorial board, explains the foundation of the journal as a kairos moment for this emerging field.

The journal promotes the use of different academic disciplines to enrich the discourse of public theology. This includes politics, economics, law and security studies, cultural studies, religion, spirituality, the natural science and the social sciences and the study of globalization. The journal attempts to provide a space for ecumenical dialogue and theological debate on global issues, in light of the emergence of world Christianity.

IJPT is published four times a year by Brill Publishers.
