= Religion in Korea =

Throughout the ages, there have been various popular religious traditions practiced on the Korean peninsula. The oldest indigenous religion of Korea is the Korean folk religion, Korean shamanism, which has been passed down from prehistory to the present. Buddhism was introduced to Korea from China during the Three Kingdoms era in the fourth century, and the religion became an important part of the culture until the Joseon Dynasty when Confucianism was established as the state philosophy. During the Late Joseon Dynasty, in the 19th century, Christianity began to take root in Korea. While both Christianity and Buddhism would play important roles in the resistance to the Japanese occupation of Korea in the first half of the 20th century, only about 4% of Koreans were members of a religious organization in 1940.

Since the division of Korea into two sovereign states in 1945—North Korea and South Korea—religious life in the two countries has diverged, shaped by different political structures. Religion in South Korea has been characterized by a rise of Christianity and a revival of Buddhism, though the majority of South Koreans either have no religious affiliation or follow folk religions. Religion in North Korea is characterized by state atheism in which freedom of religion is nonexistent. Juche ideology, which promotes the North Korean cult of personality, is regarded by experts as a kind of national religion.

== Demographics in South Korea ==
religion	1950–1962		1985		1995		2005		2015	
religion	num.	%	num.	%	num.	%	num.	%	num.	%
Christianity (overall)	-	5%	-	20.7%	11,390,000	26.0%	13,461,000	29.2%	13,566,000	27.6%
(Protestantism)	-	2.8%	-	16.1%	8,505,000	19.4%	8,446,000	18.3%	9,676,000	19.7%
(Catholic church)	-	2.2%	-	4.6%	2,885,000	6.6%	5,015,000	10.9%	3,890,000	7.9%
Buddhism	-	2.6%	-	19.9%	10,154,000	23.2%	10,588,000	22.8%	7,619,000	15.5%
other	-	92.4%	-	2.1%	-	1.2%	-	1%	-	-
non-religious	-	-	-	57.3%	-	49.6%	-	47.2%	-	56.9%

The percentage of religious beliefs by region in Korea (2015)
Administrative area	Korean Buddhism	Protestantism	Catholicism	no religion or other
Seoul	10.8%	24.2%	10.7%	53.6%
Busan	28.5%	12.1%	5.4%	53.1%
Daegu	23.8%	12.0%	7.7%	55.8%
Incheon	8.8%	23.1%	9.5%	57.9%
Gwangju	9.5%	20.0%	8.6%	61.1%
Daejeon	14.0%	21.8%	7.4%	56.2%
Ulsan	29.8%	10.9%	4.2%	54.5%
Gyeonggi Province	10.7%	23.0%	9.0%	56.7%
Gangwon Province	16.4%	17.5%	6.7%	58.7%
North Chungcheong Province	16.4%	15.8%	7.4%	60.0%
South Chungcheong Province	13.8%	20.7%	6.2%	58.7%
North Jeolla Province	8.6%	26.9%	7.6%	55.0%
South Jeolla Province	10.9%	23.2%	5.6%	59.3%
North Gyeongsang Province	25.3%	13.3%	5.2%	55.4%
South Gyeongsang Province	29.4%	10.5%	4.2%	55.1%
Jeju Special Self-Governing Province	23.4%	10.0%	7.9%	58.0%
Korea National	15.5%	19.7%	7.9%	56.1%

Korean Buddhist temples by sect (2005)
Buddhist sect	number of temples (%)
Jogye Order (조계종)	735 / 907(81%)
Taego Order (태고종)	102 / 907(11%)
Beophwa Order (법화종)	22 / 907(2%)
Zen Academy (선학원)	16 / 907(2%)
Wonhyo Order (원효종)	5 / 907(0.6%)
other	27 / 907(3%)

== History ==
=== Three Kingdoms of Korea period ===
During the Three Kingdoms of Korea, foreign religions were introduced and built on the foundation of traditional Korean beliefs. Each of the three Kingdoms adopted Buddhism and Confucianism, which coexisted alongside native Korean traditional religions.

Buddhism was introduced to Korea first during the Goguryeo. In 372, the monk Sundo (Chinese: 順道; pinyin: Shùndào) was sent by Fu Jian (337–385) (Chinese: 苻堅) of the Chinese state of Former Qin to the court of the King Sosurim of Goguryeo. He brought texts and statues (possibly of Maitreya, who was popular in Buddhism in Central Asia), and the Goguryeo royalty and their subjects quickly accepted his teachings. Additionally, it was through Goguryeo that Confucianism, a system of thought and behavior originating in ancient China, was introduced into Korea. During the reign of Sosurim, Korea established its first National Confucian Academy.

According to the Samguk sagi and Samguk yusa, the two oldest extant histories of Korea, Buddhism was officially introduced to Baekje in 384, when the Indian Buddhist monk Marananta came to Baekje from Eastern Jin. King Chimnyu welcomed him, and Baekje officially adopted Buddhism. Both Buddhism and Confucianism flourished in Baekje, and in turn Baekje played a major role in spreading Buddhism from Korea to Japan. After striking an agreement on cultural exchanges, Japan received Confucian scholars from Baekje in the years 513 and 516. Later, King Seong sent Buddhist sutras and a statue of Buddha to Japan, an event described by historian Robert Buswell as "one of the two most critical influences in the entire history of Japan, rivaled only by the nineteenth-century encounter with Western culture". The year this occurred, dated by historians to either 538 or 552, marks the official introduction of Buddhism into Japan. Within a year of this date, Baekje sent Japan nine Buddhist priests to help propagate the faith.

Baekje continued to supply Japan with Buddhist monks for the remainder of its existence. In 587, the monk P'ungguk arrived from Baekje to serve as a tutor to Emperor Yōmei's younger brother and later settled down as the first abbot of Japan's Shitennō-ji Temple. In 595, the monk Hyeja arrived in Japan from Goguryeo. He became a mentor to Prince Shōtoku and lived in Asuka Temple. By the reign of the Japanese Empress Suiko (592–628), there were over one thousand monks and nuns living in Japan, a substantial percentage of whom were Korean.

Early Buddhism in Silla developed under the influence of Goguryeo. Some monks from Goguryeo came to Silla and preached among the people, making a few converts. In 551, Hyeryang (惠亮), a Goguryeo monk, presided over the "Hundred-Seat Dharma Assembly" and the "Dharma of Eight Prohibitions". Silla formally adopted Buddhism in 527 AD after Beopheung of Silla executed Ichadon, a Buddhist convert who had tried to persuade the king to adopt Buddhism. Before he was executed, Ichadon predicted that milk colored blood would spill from his body after his death. This supposed miracle allegedly occurred according to the Samguk sagi and convinced Silla's royal court to adopt Buddhism as its state religion.

=== Goryeo period ===
In the heyday of the Goryeo Dynasty, Buddhism was the state religion of Korea. A significant religious historical event of the Goryeo period was the production of the first woodblock edition of the Tripiṭaka, known as the Tripitaka Koreana. Two editions were made: the first from 1210 to 1231, and the second from 1214 to 1259. The first edition was destroyed in a fire during an attack by the Mongols in 1232, but the second edition still exists at Haeinsa in Gyeongsang Province. This edition of the Tripitaka was of high quality and served as the standard version in East Asia for almost 700 years.

Successive kings of the Goryeo dynasty exercised their supervisory powers over Buddhism and Confucianism, as well as over shamanism (巫俗). After entering the Joseon Dynasty (朝鮮), the government was divided into Domu (都巫) and Jongmu (從巫). In addition, in the east and west of the province, Hwarin-seo (活人署) were placed to accommodate the sick and the poor (貧者), and Mugyeok (巫覡) had them healed or took care of the poor. This has been the case since the Goguryeo period, with the state having Mugyeok work in state institutions.

=== Joseon Dynasty ===
The Joseon dynasty ran an observatory-forecasting service called Gwangsanggam (관상감; 觀象監), in which two members professionalized in myeonggwahak (명과학; 命課學) were to take charge of fortune-telling.

The Joseon Dynasty initially adopted Buddhism as a religion and Confucianism as a political ideology, but gradually shifted to a policy of sungyueokbul (숭유억불), in which Buddhism was suppressed in state affairs and replaced by Confucian principles. In the first half of the Joseon dynasty, Buddhist monk Hyujeong (휴정; 休靜) argued that the three religions of Confucianism, Buddhism, and Taoism were in agreement with each other on fundamental levels, similar to the Three teachings. Also, there were Confucian scholars such as Maewŏltang Kim Sisŭp who sought to explain Buddhist concepts through Confucian principles.

Taoism, which has been handed down since the Goguryeo period, had Daecheong-gwan in Kaesong. After the relocation of Hanseong, Sogyeok-jeon was established, and Doryu was designated as a season, taking charge of Samcheong and Seong-jin. In addition, the worship of the Crown Prince (關王) was transmitted to the people. As fortune-telling, secret divination, and Gam-rok spread to the civilian population, ideas such as hermitage, the last days, the rebellious revolution, and fate permeated the people deeply.

==== Catholicism ====
As the Joseon dynasty entered the modern era whilst keeping the state in relative isolation, it soon faced the problem of the transmission of Western religions. Catholicism (천주교) or sometimes called seogyo (서교; 西敎) was introduced in the late 18th century as a part of Western thoughts and studies (서학; 西學; seo-hak).

Catholicism was secretly spread by missionaries infiltrating the country despite the prohibition, and it led to multiple persecutions by the court during the 19th century. This persecution was caused not only by the court's religious policy but also by actions that ran counter to Confucian ideology and Joseon policies. For example, the Hwang Sa-Yeong White Book incident, which was sparked by Catholics seeking freedom of religious belief, led to the worsening of the Sinyu Persecution (신유박해) in 1801.

==== Donghak ====
Due to internal and external circumstances, the court took a liberal attitude toward Western religions in 1896. This made it easy for several denominations of Protestantism to enter. Donghak emerged as a national religion amid the adversity posed by Western religions. Within two years of Donghak's emergence, it developed to the point of establishing a system of affiliates and missionaries (접주) in various places and strengthening the denomination's organization. Eventually, it became Cheondogyo, and, under Lee Don-Hwa (이돈화; 李敦化), it was ideologically developed, even to the point of a philosophy of a new man.

=== Japanese colonial period ===
During the Japanese colonial period, the Governor-General's Office of Korea applied the Monastery Ordinance (사찰령) and the Honmuk Monastery Act (본말사법) to Buddhism. The Joseon Governor-General's Decree was applied to Yurim; the Foundation Act was applied to Christianity in accordance with the Governor-General's policies; and religious organizations inherent in the Korean people were designated as similar religious organizations in addition to religion. The Governor-General's Office recognizes Shintoism, Buddhism and Christianity as religions. Chengkyunkwan of Confucianism is regarded as a school of economics, and social education law is applied to it; it is regarded as a social education institution. The Confucian temple becomes a club officer currency, and the school (향교) is regarded as a local public body or local educational institution.

== Modern ==
=== Democratic People's Republic of Korea ===
At the time of liberation in 1945, there were about 1.5 million religious people in North Korea, 375,000 Buddhists, 200,000 Protestants, and 57,000 Catholics. There were more than 2 million religious people (22.2 percent of the population at that time). However, due to the regime's policy of stifling religion, North Korea's religious population has been greatly reduced. In a report submitted to the U.N. Human Rights Council in 2001, the North Korean regime recorded a total of 37,800 religious people, including 15,000 Chondoists, 10,000 Buddhists, 12,000 Protestants, and 800 Catholics. The number of facilities for each religion is 800, 60 temples, two churches, and one church. North Korean defectors agree that religious activities are impossible in North Korea due to the crackdown on religious activities. Religious people are subjected to human rights repression in political prison camps in the Democratic People's Republic of Korea.

=== Korean shamanism (Korean folk religion) ===
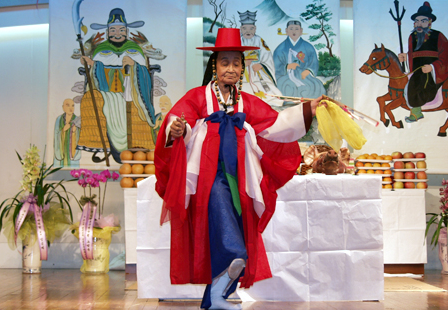
Mudang performing a ritual placating the angry spirits of the dead

Shamanism or Folk Religion (Korean: 무속신앙, 무속, or 민간신앙; Hanja: 巫敎, 巫俗, or 民間信仰; RR: musoksinang, music, or mingansinang) is the oldest religious tradition in Korea, dating back as far as Old Joseon. Given its ancient origins, while Shamanism is still practiced, it is considered rather heretical and superstitious today. Shamans are typically women who are called mudang (Korean: 무당; Hanja: 巫―).

There are many myths and legends surrounding Korean Shamanism, but today, Koreans mostly go to shamans to get advice, interpret the importance of dates and omens, determine compatibility in a couple, or get a Fulu (Korean: 부적; Hanja: 符籍), or talisman, to ward away evil spirits.

That said, Shamans may perform gut (a ritualistic dance and song as a prayer to gods or ancestors, or a purification ritual.

=== Korean Buddhism ===
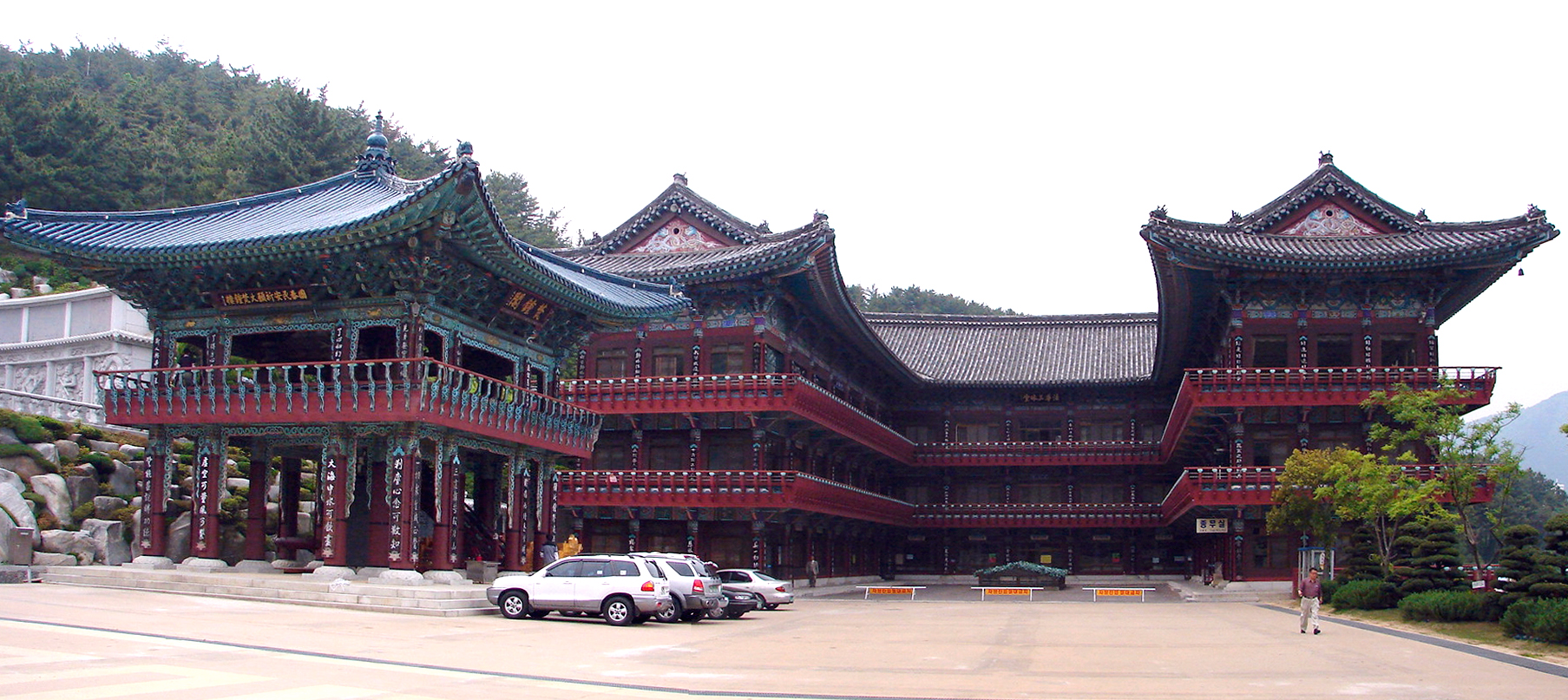
Samgwangsa Temple (삼광사) in Busan

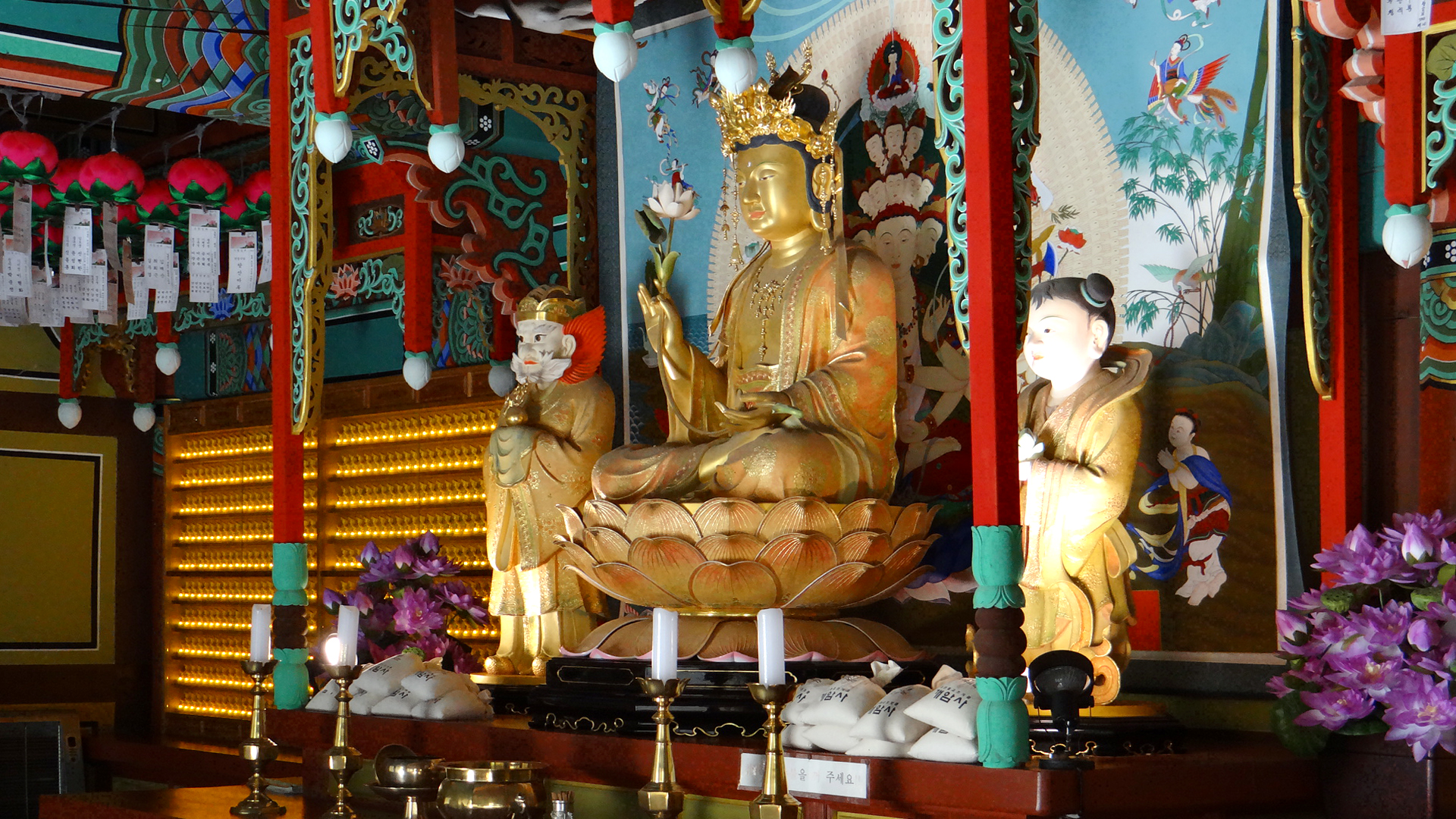
Gaeamsa Temple (개암사) in Buan County, North Jeolla Province

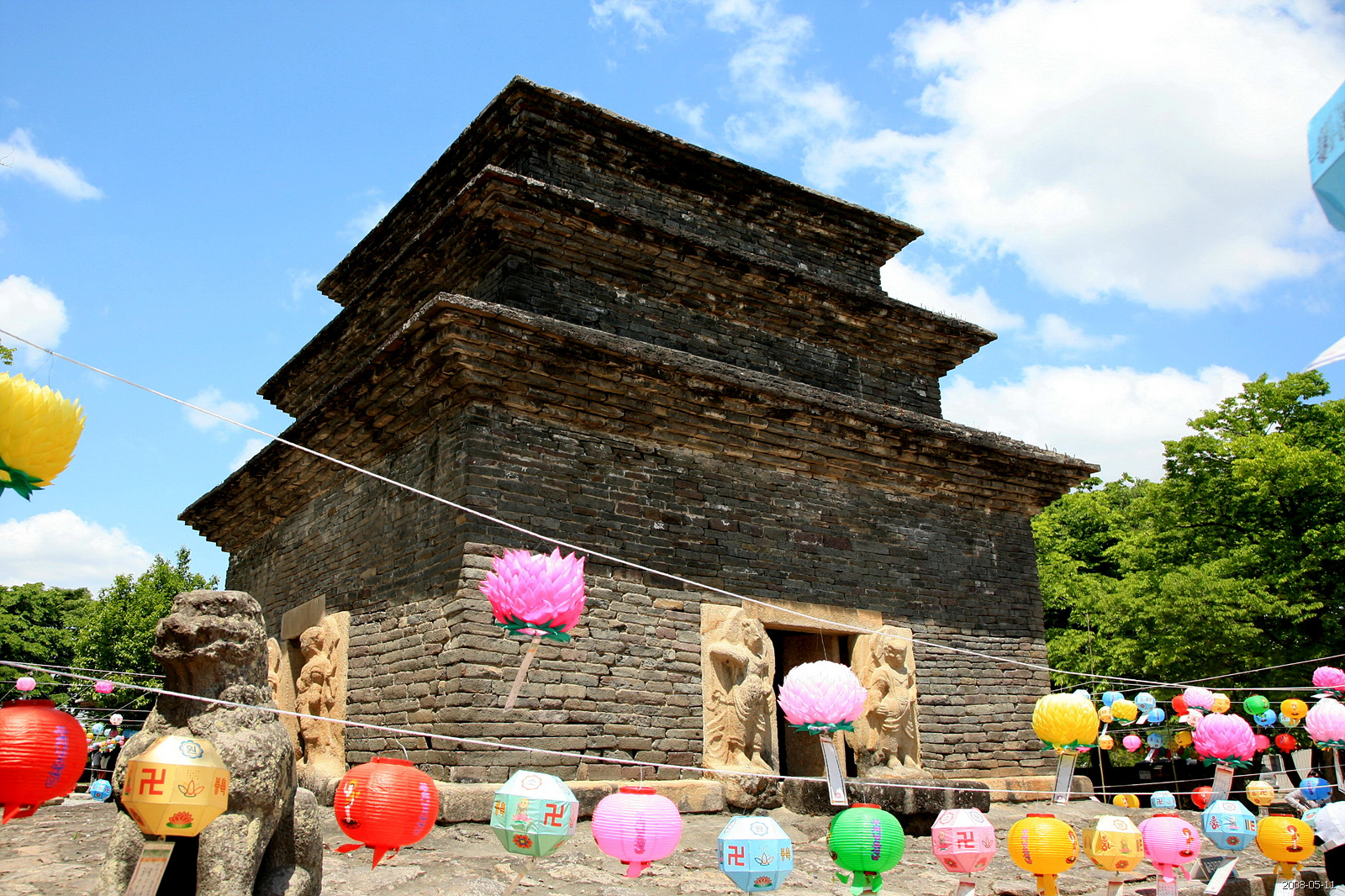
Bunhwangsa Temple (분황사) in Gyeongju

Buddhism was introduced from China during the Three Kingdoms period of Korea and had an important influence on the culture of the Silla and Goryeo dynasties and became the main religion of these two dynasties. Buddhism has far-reaching influence in the Yeongnam region of Korea, Gangwon Province, and Jeju Island. The Jogye Sect is the main sect of Korean Buddhism, and most Korean Buddhist temples belong to the Jogye Sect, including the famous Buddhist temples of Bulguksa, Haeinsa, and Hwaeomsa. Other traditional Buddhist schools in Korea include the Taego Sect and the Cheontae Sect.

==== Won Buddhism ====
Won Buddhism (원불교) is a modern sect of Korean Buddhism. Won Buddhism simplifies Buddhist scriptures and ceremonies. They insist that anyone, regardless of the wise or the ignorant, rich or poor, noble or low, can understand Buddhism.

=== Korean Christianity ===
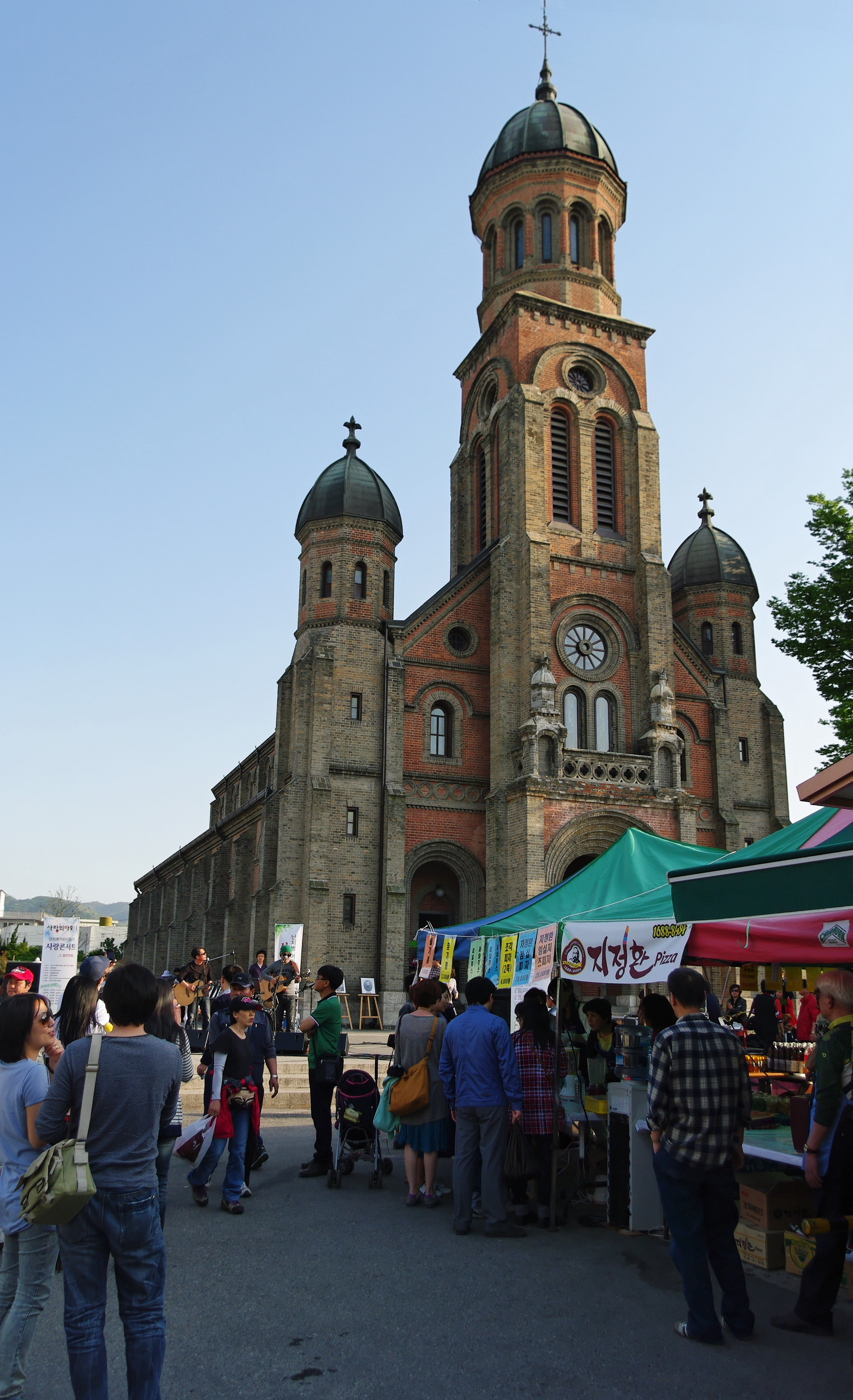
Jeondong Cathedral in Jeonju, North Jeolla Province

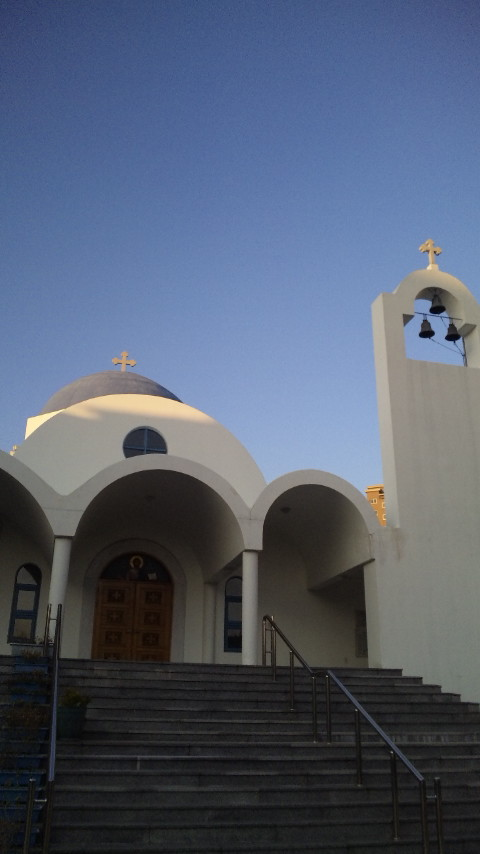
Church of St. Dionysios in Ulsan

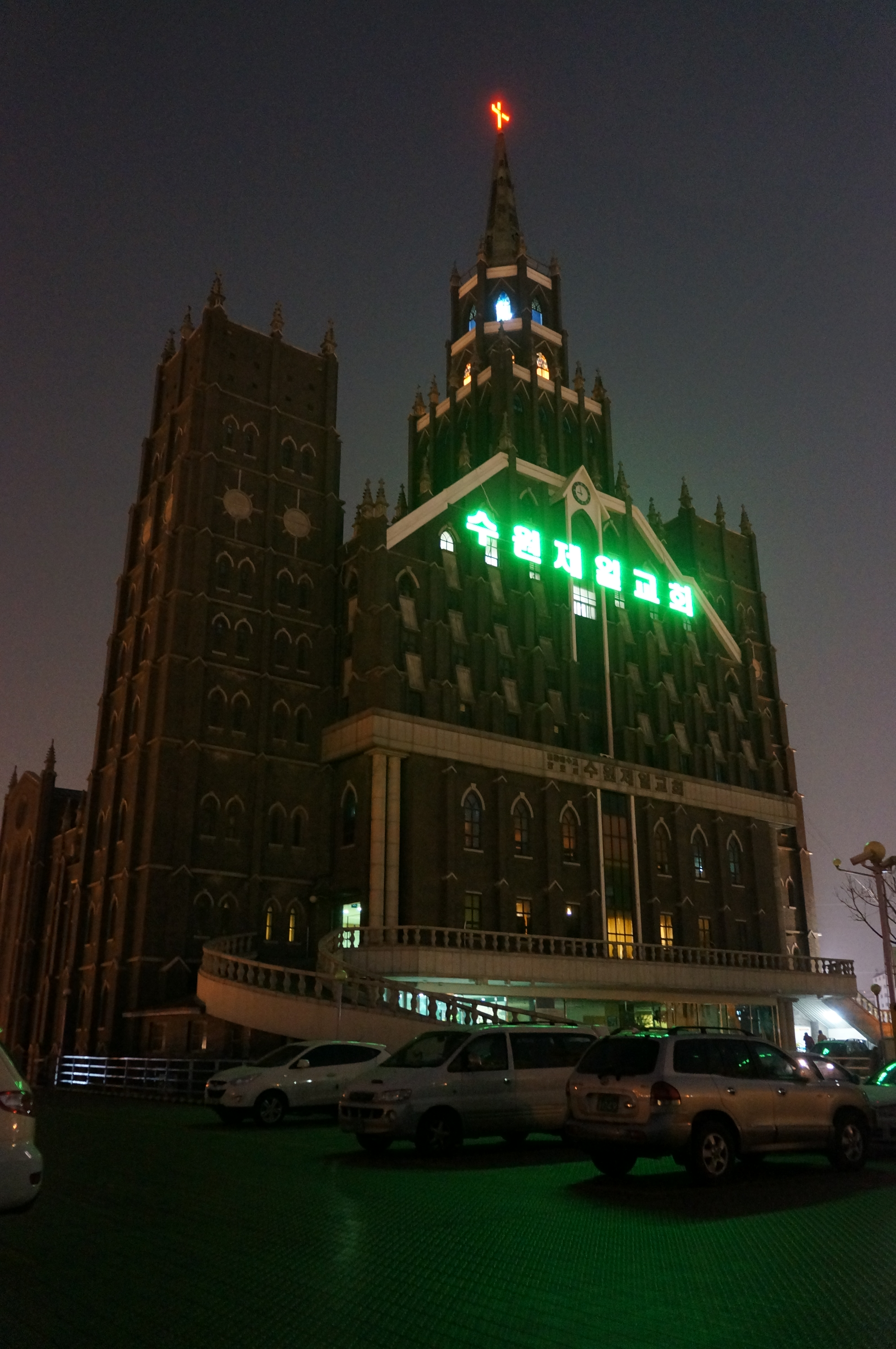
Night view of a church in Suwon, Gyeonggi-do

Christianity in South Korea is mainly composed of Protestantism and Catholicism; in the 2015 census, there were 9.7 million Protestants and 3.9 million Catholics. In addition to Western churches, South Korea also has members of the Eastern Orthodox Church and members of The Church of Jesus Christ of Latter-day Saints who were imported from Russia in the 19th century. Roman Catholic missionaries arrived in Korea in 1794, a decade after a Korean diplomat Yi Seung-hun (이승훈) returned to Korea. Protestant missionaries arrived in the Joseon Dynasty in 1880. Both Protestant and Catholic missionaries converted large number of Koreans to Christianity. The Methodist Church and the Presbyterian Church established schools, hospitals, and orphanages in Korea and played an important role in the modernization of Korea.

During the Japanese occupation period, Korean Christians played an important role in the struggle for independence. Factors contributing to the rapid growth of Protestants include the corrupt state of Korean Buddhism, support from intellectual elites, Korean church members' encouragement of self-reliance and self-government, and the promotion of Korean nationalism. Before the separation of the two Koreas, a large number of Christians lived in the northern part of the Korean peninsula, and the influence of Confucianism was not as strong as that in the southern part of the Korean peninsula. Before 1948 Pyongyang was an important center of the Christian faith. After the establishment of a communist regime in the north of the Korean peninsula, it is estimated that more than one million South Korean Christians fled to the south of the peninsula to escape the persecution of Christianity in North Korea. Christianity saw a huge increase in the number of people professing it in the 1970s and 1980s. Growth continued in the 1990s, but at a slow pace, with numbers declining since the beginning of the twenty-first century.

Christianity is an important religion in regions including Seoul, Incheon, Gyeonggi Province, and Honam. There are four main denominations of Christianity in Korea: Presbyterian, Methodist, Baptist, and Catholic. Yeouido Full Gospel Church is the largest Pentecostal church in Korea. Korean Catholics can still keep the traditional ritual of worshipping ancestors, just like Catholics in the Chinese world; on the contrary, Protestants have completely abandoned the ritual of worshipping ancestors.

=== Korean Islam ===
There are about 200,000 followers of Islam (Korean: 이슬람교) in South Korea, most of whom are foreign migrant workers from South Asia, West Asia, Indonesia, and Malaysia, and there are less than 30,000 local Korean Muslims. The Korean Muslim communities are mainly located in Seoul and Busan, with Seoul containing about 40% of the country’s Muslims. The largest mosque in South Korea is the Seoul Central Mosque and there are smaller mosques found in the other cities. Seoul alone has 40% of South Korea's total Muslim population.

=== Judaism ===
Jews first came to South Korea with the US military during the Korean War in 1950, Jewish-American soldiers tried to help poor Koreans (especially children) and formed a small community. The Jewish community in South Korea is very small, found only in the Seoul area, with very few Koreans believing in Judaism (유태교).

=== Hinduism ===
South Korea's Hindu believers are mainly Indian and Nepalese migrant workers living in South Korea. However, Hindu traditions, such as yoga and Vedanta, sparked Koreans' interest in Indian culture. There are two Hindu temples in the Seoul area.

=== Korean Confucianism ===
Among historians, it can be argued that Confucianism has been around on the Korean Peninsula since ancient times. However, not an exact time frame can be pinpointed but it is estimated that Confucianism came to the peninsula prior to the Three Kingdoms period. Even in the third and fourth centuries historians gather that Confucian precepts were used by court nobles and others which means that Confucian thought influenced the intellectuals on the peninsula. Confucian thought began to dominate its influence in the government starting in the fourteenth century and moving into the sixteenth century it became the dominant thought and philosophy on the Korean Peninsula.

The rise of Confucianism in Korea led to the rapid decline of Buddhism. During the fifteenth century, King Taejong enacted an anti-Buddhist policy which included reducing the number of monasteries and temples. When Confucianism began to be the dominant philosophy in the sixteenth century, Buddhism became the religion of the uneducated and rural people. The golden age of Confucianism in Korea was during the Joseon Dynasty.

In modern Korea, Confucian temples and educational institutions still exist and exhibit modern practices however, after World War II Confucianism disappeared from the school curriculum. There was a revival of Confucianism in the late 1990s and some practices can still be seen being exhibited today such as funeral rites (which are a mixture of both Christian and Confucianism) and the concept of filial piety. Some of these observations include the veneration of elders, a strong commitment to education, and the rituals and rites dedicated to the dead.

== Sources ==
- "Buddhism". Encyclopedia of World Religions. Encyclopaedia Britannica. 2008. ISBN 978-1593394912.
- Kim, Sebastian C. H.; Kim, Kirsteen (2014). A History of Korean Christianity. Cambridge: Cambridge University Press. ISBN 978-1316123140.
- Yu, Chai-Shin (2012). The New History of Korean Civilization. iUniverse. ISBN 978-1462055593.
