= Madras College =

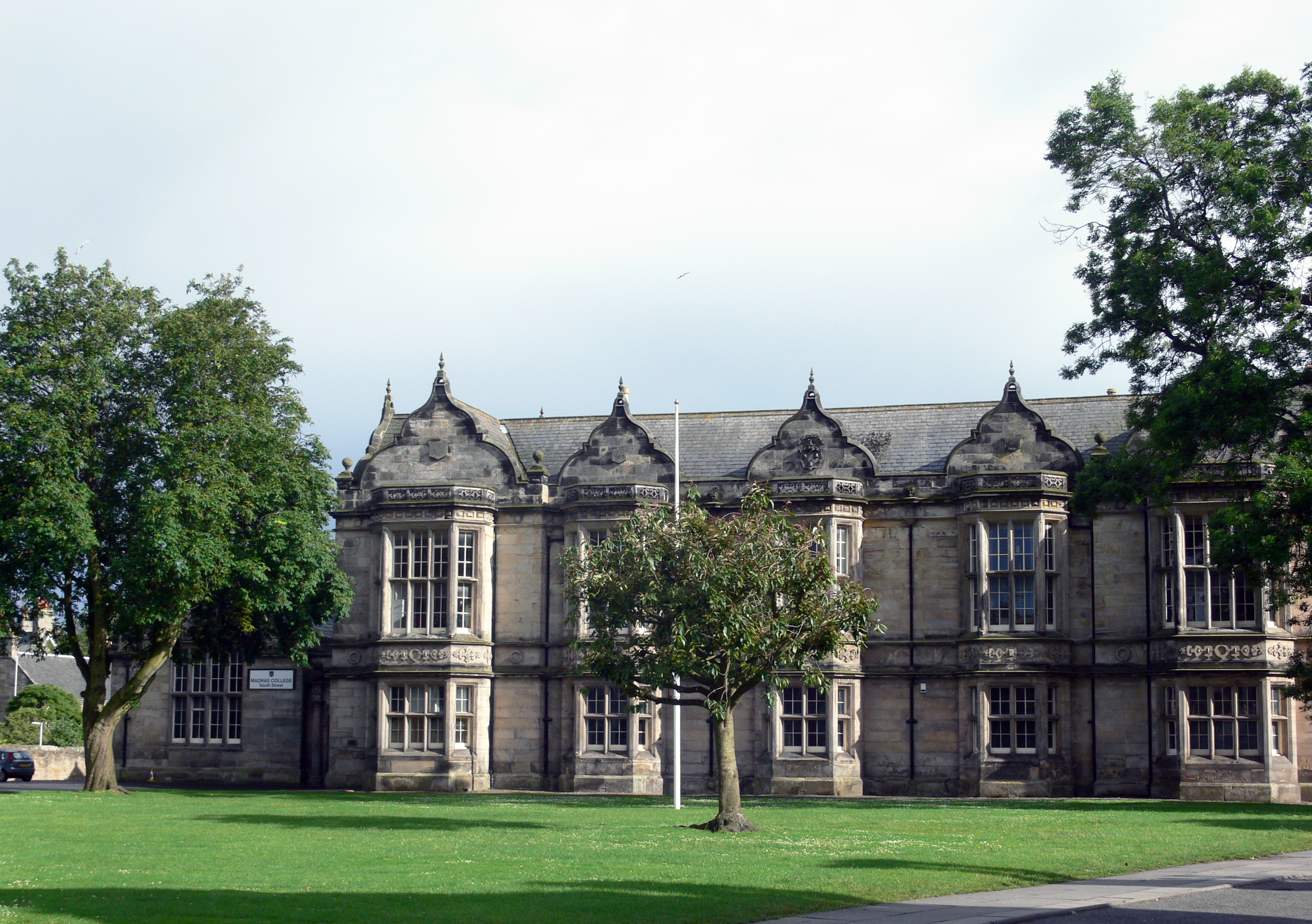
- Madras College's Original South Street Site

Location
- St Andrews, Fife, KY16 9EJ; Scotland; 56.338°N 2.798°W

Information
- Type: Secondary school; Comprehensive school
- Motto: Latin: Pro Rege Et Grege (For King and People)
- Established: 1833; 193 years ago
- Founder: Andrew Bell
- Rector: Ken Currie
- Gender: Co-educational
- Age: 11 to 18
- Enrolment: 1243 (2018)
- Houses: Blackfriars; Castle; Priory; Swilken
- Colours: Navy and White
- Publication: Madras College Magazine; Abbey Times; ACTA; Blueprint
- School Years: S1-S6
- Website: www.madras.fife.sch.uk

Madras College, often referred to as Madras, is a Scottish comprehensive secondary school located in St Andrews, Fife. It educates over 1,400 pupils aged between 11 and 18 and was founded in 1833 by Andrew Bell.

== History ==
Madras College, founded in 1833, takes its name from the system of education devised by the school's founder, Andrew Bell. However, the origins of the school can be traced to at least the 1490s, through its predecessor institution, the Grammar School of St Andrews.

Bell was born in St Andrews in 1753, the son of a local magistrate and wig-maker. He studied at the University of St Andrews where he distinguished himself in mathematics. He became an Episcopalian clergyman and took up an appointment as chaplain to the regiments of the East India Company in Madras (known since 1996 as Chennai), India. One of his duties was to educate the soldiers' children. Because there was a shortage of teachers, he used the older students, who had been taught the lesson by the master, to instruct groups of younger pupils. The pupils who assisted the teacher were called 'monitors'. This method of education became widely used in schools at home and abroad.

After his return from India, Bell made it his life's work to travel the country and encourage schools to adopt 'the Madras system', as it had come to be known. By the time of his death in 1832, over 10,000 schools were using his methods.

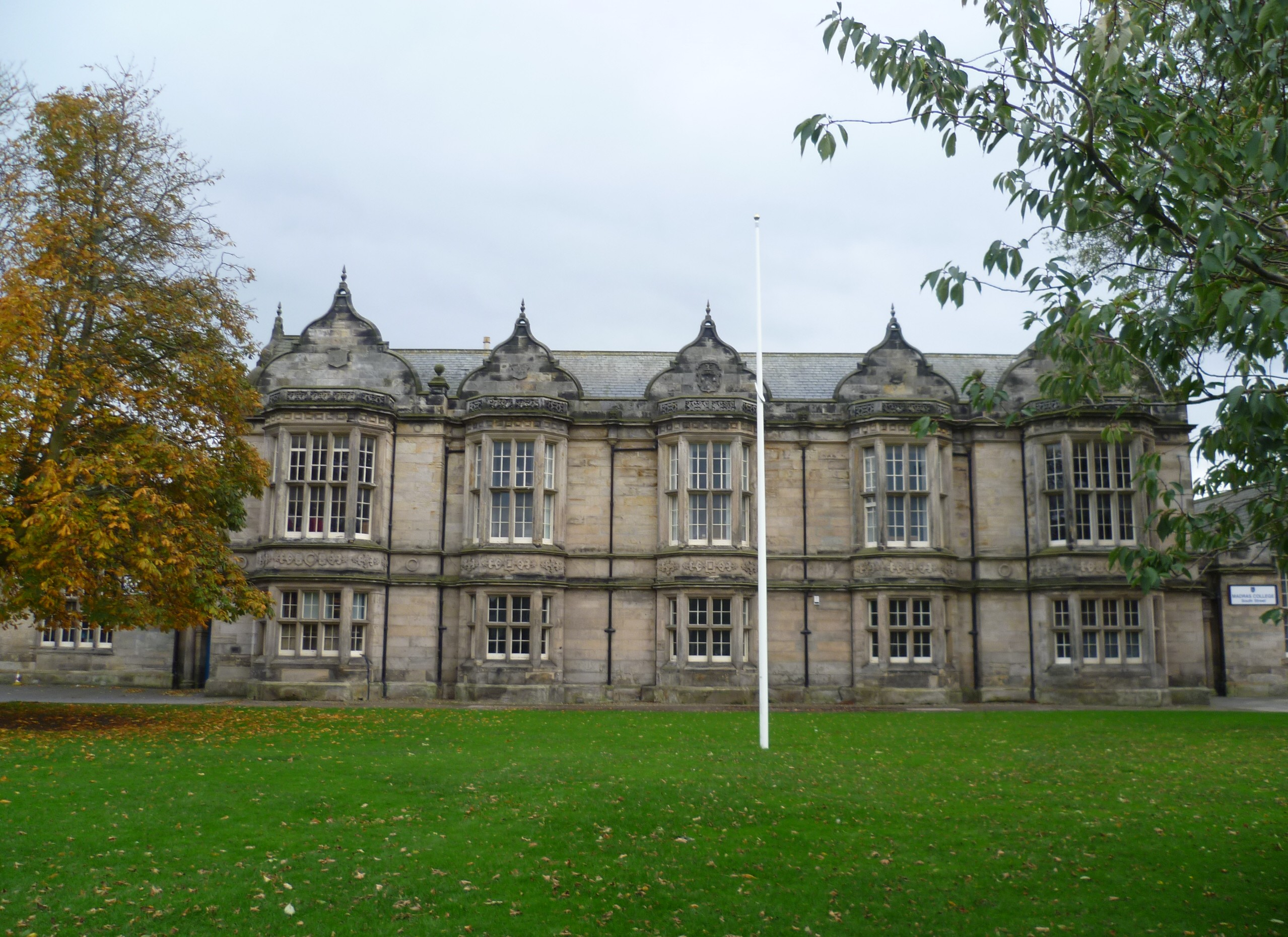
Madras College; the senior school building on South Street, St Andrews

Madras College was founded in 1832 at the bequest and expense of Bell, as the amalgamation of several St Andrews schools. The first amalgamation was in 1833 when the old Grammar School of St Andrews was joined with the "English" school (founded in the 1750s) to form the Madras College. The origin of these names being that the Grammar School was taught mostly in Latin while the "English" school used English only. The Grammar School stood on the grounds between Blackfriars' Church and Lade Braes; the "English" school was on the grounds behind the Church of Holy Trinity, approximately where the town library is today.

The second amalgamation happened in 1963, when Madras College was merged with the Burgh School (founded 1889, based in Abbey Walk). As part of this amalgamation and the introduction of comprehensive education, a new school building was contracted on Kilrymont Road, a mile and a half from the South Street building. The Kilrymont building was constructed in a modernist style, with adjacent playing fields and was opened in 1967. The school was the only secondary school in Scotland on a split site.

The school catchment area takes in a large part of rural north east Fife, and most of the pupils travel in from the surrounding area by bus.

The badge is a chevron between three bells – a reference to Bell. The Latin motto is "pro rege et grege" which is customarily translated as "For King and People".

Bell also left money for schools in Inverness (Faraline Park, now Inverness Library), Glasgow, Edinburgh, Leith (Commercial Street) and Cupar (now called Bell Baxter High School, formerly Madras Academy).

In 2021 the school moved into a new building in Bell Brae, north-west of town, built at a cost of £50 million.

The former Kilrymont campus was converted to luxury accommodation for St Andrews University students, whilst the historic South Street campus was bought by the university to be turned into their "New College". The last year group to be educated at South Street was the class of 2017–2023. The last to have received education at the Kilrymont campus was the class of 2020–2026.

== Staff ==
=== Rectors ===
From the foundation of Madras College in 1833 until 1888, the school was run by a board of trustees. As part of a series of reforms made at Madras in 1888/89, the position of rector was established. Since 1889 the rectors have been:

- 1889–1915 J MacKenzie
- 1915–1920 J.M Moore
- 1920–1923 H.F Martin
- 1923–1941 J. D. McPetrie
- 1941–1955 N. Macleod
- 1955–1975 John Thompson
- 1975–1985 I. D. Gilroy
- 1985–1997 D. D. Galloway
- 1997–2007 L. S. G. Matheson
- 2007–2013 I. Jones
- 2013–2020 D. McClure
- 2020-2021 A. McNeill
- 2021–present K. Currie

=== Other ===
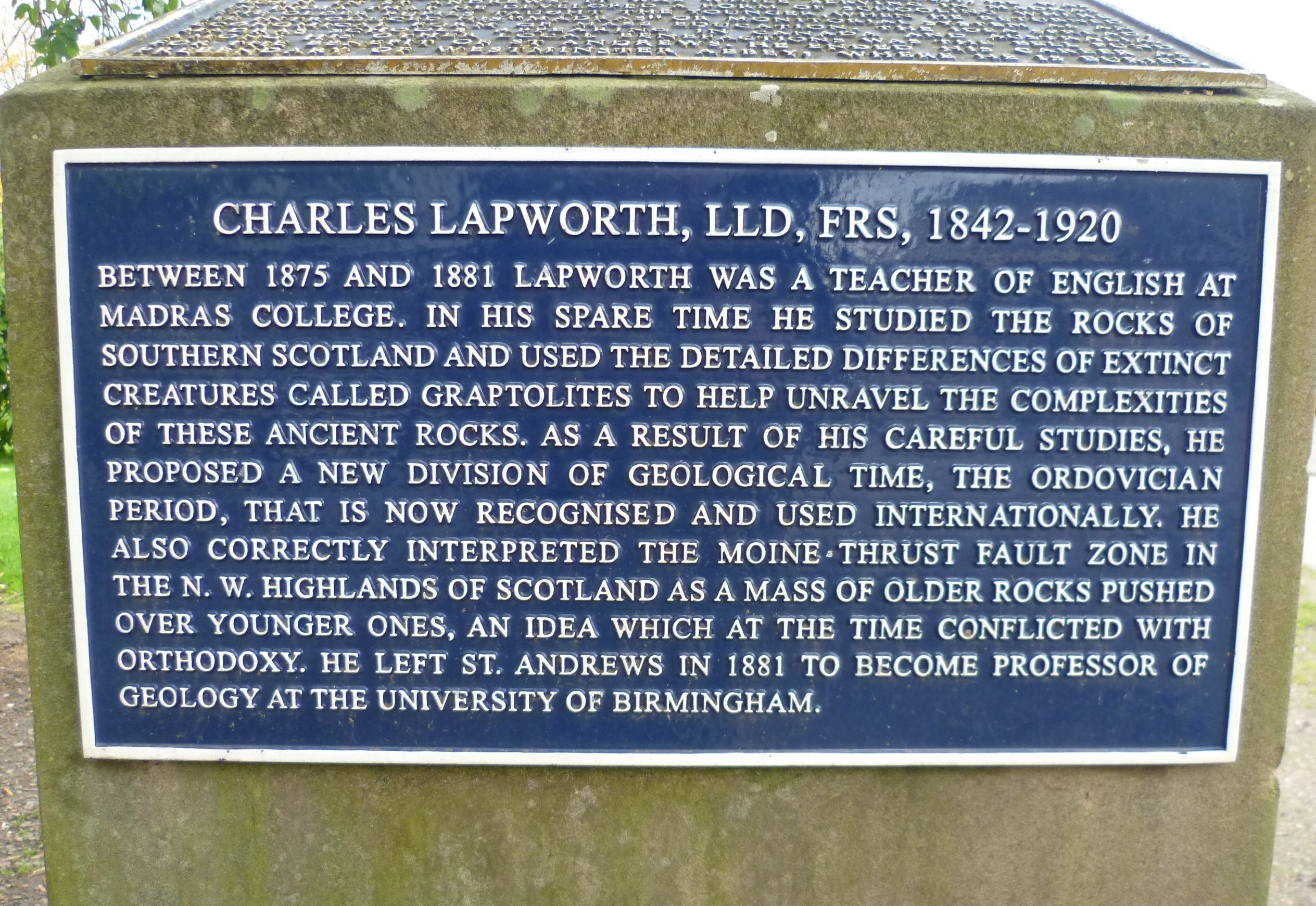
Charles Lapworth plaque at Madras College

- Charles Lapworth (20 September 1842 – 13 March 1920) taught English at Madras. He went on to be the first professor of geology at the University of Birmingham. The latter's Lapworth Museum is named in his honour, and holds his archive. He is known for identifying and naming the Ordovician period.

== Notable former pupils ==
- Colonel Robert Hope Moncrieff Aitken VC – soldier and recipient of the Victoria Cross
- John Maxwell Anderson – surgeon and cancer specialist
- Martin Anderson – artist and political cartoonist, better known by his pseudonym Cynicus
- Peter Corsar Anderson – educator and principal of the Scotch College, Perth, Australia
- Sir Robert Balfour – Member of Parliament for Partick
- Beta Band – post-folk band
- James Bridie – Rugby union international who represented Wales
- Ted Brocklebank – journalist, broadcaster and Member of the Scottish Parliament for Mid Scotland and Fife
- Gavin Brown – former Vice-Chancellor of the University of Sydney
- John Munro Bruce – Australian businessman
- Chris Burdon - sound engineer and Oscar winner (2022)
- Sir Charles Cameron – physician, newspaper editor and Member of Parliament for Glasgow College and Glasgow Bridgeton
- Bunny Christie – theatre set designer
- Alfred Clunies-Ross – rugby union international who represented Scotland in the first international rugby match in 1871
- Alex Cole-Hamilton – politician and leader of the Scottish Liberal Democrats
- Hamish Cowell – British Ambassador to Tunisia
- John Craig – classicist and Firth Professor of Latin at the University of Sheffield
- Learmonth White Dalrymple – New Zealand educationalist
- Rob Dewey – Rugby union international
- Dogs Die In Hot Cars – indie band
- Donald Douglas (surgeon) – surgeon
- Dame Honor Fell – scientist and zoologist
- Olga FitzRoy – audio engineer at Associated Independent Recording and activist
- David Hay Fleming – Scottish historian and antiquarian
- Duncan Forrester – Scottish theologian and the founder of the Centre for Theology and Public Issues at New College, Edinburgh
- Richard Gadd – writer, actor and comedian
- Jenny Gilruth – politician
- Neil A. R. Gow – professor of Mircobiology
- Sir Edmund Hirst – chemist and Forbes Chair of Organic Chemistry at the University of Edinburgh
- Mike Hulme – Professor of Human Geography at the University of Cambridge
- Christopher Johnston, Lord Sands – judge and Member of Parliament for Edinburgh and St Andrews Universities
- King Creosote – musician
- Andrew Kirkaldy – racing driver and managing director of McLaren GT
- Chris Law – Member of Parliament for Dundee West
- George Carmichael Low – parasitologist and founder of the Royal Society of Tropical Medicine and Hygiene
- Andrew Lemoncello – British long distance runner
- Roddy Lumsden – poet
- Doon Mackichan – comedy actress, most notably in Smack the Pony
- John Maclean – musician and film director
- Penny Martin – editor of The Gentlewoman
- Steve Mason – musician and founder of The Beta Band
- Andrew McLellan – Church of Scotland minister, Moderator of the Church of Scotland and Chief Inspector of Prisons for Scotland
- Major Maury Meiklejohn VC – soldier and recipient of the Victoria Cross
- Anne Miller – author, QI Elf and radio producer
- William M'Intosh – physician, marine zoologist and Professor of Natural History at the University of St Andrews
- Old Tom Morris – champion golfer and golf course designer
- Gordon Moulds – Air Commodore who previously held a senior post in the Falkland Islands
- Victor Plarr – poet
- Anna Poole, Lady Poole – judge
- Eve Poole – author
- Jamie Ritchie – rugby union international representing Scotland
- James Robertson – believed to be world's first black rugby union player
- Walter Rutherford – silver medalist in golf at the 1900 Olympic Games in Paris
- Shaun Simpson – British motocross champion
- Christiana Spens – writer and artist
- Alastair Stewart – newsreader
- James Stuart – Member of Parliament for Hackney; Hoxton; and Sunderland and Rector of the University of St Andrews
- Francine Toon – novelist and poet
- KT Tunstall – musician
- Adam Werritty – businessman
- James Yorkston – musician

== Bibliography ==
- Galloway, D. D. (1989). In the Footsteps of Dr Bell. St Andrews: Madras College
- Gilroy, I. D. (1997). The Rev Dr Andrew Bell: Founder of Madras College. St Andrews: Madras College
- Lamont-Brown, R. (2006). St Andrews: City by the Northern Sea. Edinburgh: Birlinn
- Southey, R. (1844). The Life of Rev. Andrew Bell: Comprising the History of the Rise and Progress of the System of Mutual Tuition. London: John Murray
- Stephen, K. (1983). Andrew Bell F.R.S.E. (1753–1832). Edinburgh: University of Edinburgh History of Medicine and Science Unit
- Thompson, J. (1983). The Madras College 1833–1983. Fife: Fife Educational Resource Centre
