= John Baillie (theologian) =

Scottish theologian (1886–1960)

The Very Reverend Professor John Baillie CH
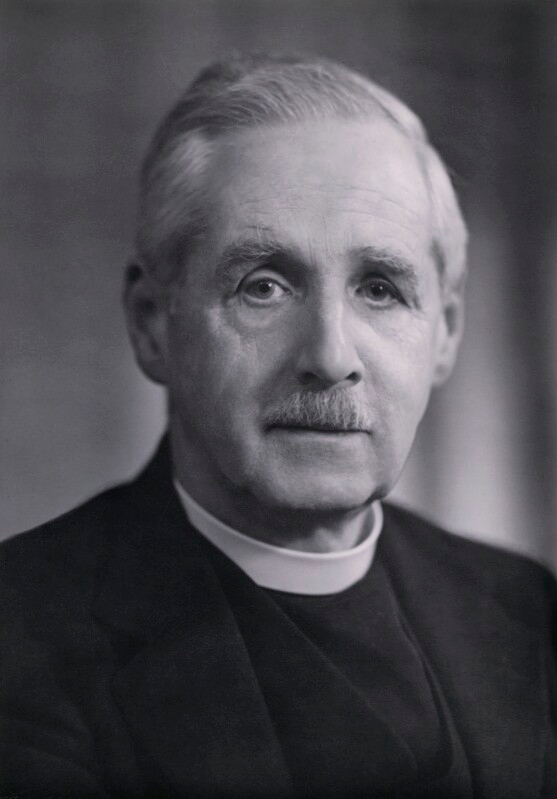
- Baillie in 1942

Principal of New College, Edinburgh
- In office 1950–1956

Chaplain to the King/Queen in Scotland
- In office 1947–1956

Moderator of the General Assembly of the Church of Scotland
- In office 1943–1944

Professor of Divinity, University of Edinburgh
- In office 1934–1956

Personal details
- Born: 26 March 1886 Gairloch, Ross-shire, Scotland
- Died: 29 September 1960 (aged 74) Edinburgh, Scotland

John Baillie (26 March 1886, Gairloch – 29 September 1960, Edinburgh) was a Scottish theologian, a Church of Scotland minister and brother of theologian Donald Macpherson Baillie.

== Life ==
Son of Free Church minister John Baillie (1829–1891), and his wife, Annie MacPherson, he was born in the Free Church manse in Gairloch, Wester Ross, on 26 March 1886.

A leading theologian, he held academic posts in the UK, USA, and Canada. His brother Donald Macpherson Baillie was Professor of Systematic Theology at the University of St. Andrews and his other brother Peter Baillie served as a missionary doctor at Jalna, India.

Raised in the Calvinist tradition, Baillie studied divinity at Edinburgh University. After graduating he undertook further studies at both Jena and Marburg in Germany and then went to teach in Canada and the United States. He gained a D.Litt. on the theory of religion from Edinburgh University in 1928 which formed the basis of a book published in the same year. He was a professor at Edinburgh University from 1934 to 1959, serving as principal of New College and dean of the Faculty of Divinity from 1950 to 1956. He was Moderator of the General Assembly of the Church of Scotland in 1943. In 1958 he was awarded an honorary doctorate (D. theol. h. c.) by the University of Jena on the occasion of the university's fourth centenary. He was appointed a Chaplain in Ordinary to the King in 1947.

Baillie wrote A Diary of Private Prayer (1936), regarded as a devotional classic. But his most important contribution to theology was an exploration of the relationship of the knowledge of God to spiritual and moral experience. He served alongside of John T. McNeill and Henry P. Van Dusen as a general editor of the Library of Christian Classics series, which includes modern translations of the writings of Christian theologians and thinkers such as Aquinas, Augustine, Calvin, Luther and other reformers and early church fathers.

As Convener of the Church of Scotland's General Assembly's "Commission for the Interpretation of God's Will in the Present Crisis" ("The Baillie Commission"), reporting to the Assembly 1941 to 1945, Baillie helped the Church to think through its approach and mission to the post-war world. In 1948 he, and Isobel Forrester, and his brother, Donald, formed the Scottish Churches Ecumenical Association, which in 1950 merged with the Dollarbeg group which had organised ecumenical conferences since 1945.

Shortly after his death in 1960, the series of Gifford Lectures he had prepared for the 1961–2 academic year was read by John McIntyre and Thomas F. Torrance and published by Oxford University Press.

== Family ==
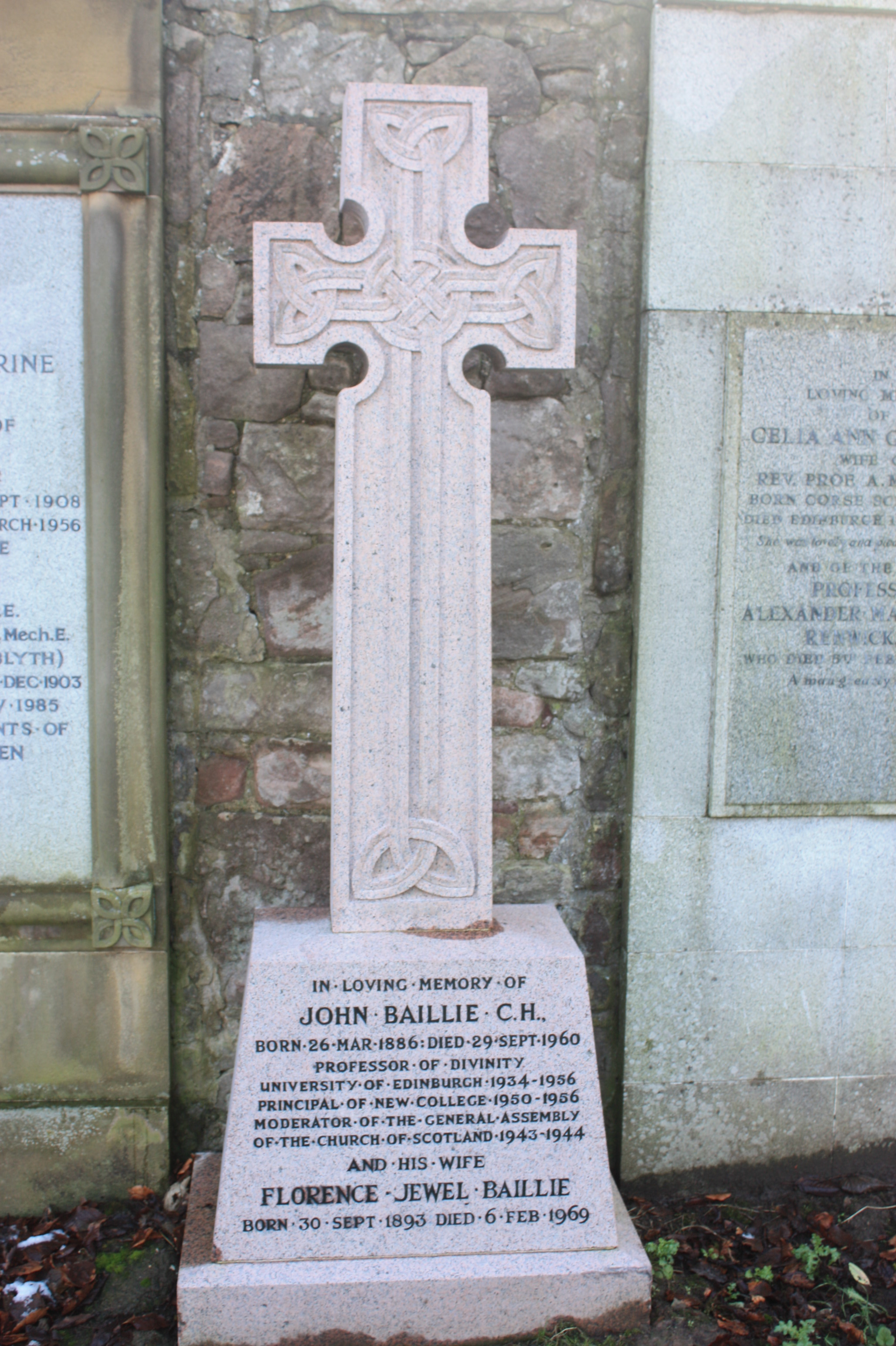
The grave of Rev John Baillie, Grange Cemetery, Edinburgh

He met Florence Jewel Fowler (1893–1969) while he was in France during the First World War. They married at Leamington Spa in 1919. Their only child, Ian Fowler Baillie, was born in 1921.

He is buried with his wife Florence Jewel Baillie in Grange Cemetery in Edinburgh near the southeast corner of the original cemetery close to the Usher memorial. The grave is marked by a pale pink granite cross.

== Sources ==
- Nigel M. de S. et al., Dictionary of Scottish Church History and Theology, pp. 693–698. T & T Clark, Edinburgh 1993. ISBN 0-567-09650-5
- John McIntyre, Foreword, in John Baillie, The Sense of the Presence of God, Oxford University Press, 1962
- George Newlands, "John and Donald Baillie" in Blackie, Nansie (2005) A Time for Trumpets: Scottish Church movers and shakers of the twentieth century Edinburgh: Saint Andrew Press pp. 17–28.
- Norbert Nail: John Baillie - Schotte, Pastor, Student 1909/11 in Jena und Marburg. In: Studenten-Kurier 3/2017, pp. 16–18. https://www.uni-marburg.de/de/uniarchiv/inhalte-pdf/sk-2017-3-john-baillie.pdf
