= John Maxwell Anderson =

Scottish surgeon (1928–1982)

- Born: 1928
- Died: 31 January 1982 (aged 53–54)
- Occupations: surgeon and cancer specialist

John Maxwell Anderson FRCS, FRCSED (1928 – 31 January 1982) was a Scottish consultant surgeon and cancer specialist whose research focused on tissue transplantation, cancer immunology and chemotherapy.

== Career ==
John Maxwell Anderson was educated at Madras College, St Andrews and Strathallan School, Perthshire. He graduated from the University of St Andrews in 1952 (MB ChB). Following the completion of his national service with the Royal Air Force, Anderson had a varied postgraduate training. In 1959 he became a Fellow of the Royal College of Surgeons (FRCS) and a Fellow of the Royal College of Surgeons of Edinburgh (FRCSED).

In 1960 Anderson was appointed senior registrar to Professor Ian Aird at the Hammersmith Hospital in London. Thereafter, he went to Harvard Medical School and Peter Bent Brigham Hospital in Boston where he conducted valuable original research. In 1966 Anderson was appointed consultant surgeon at Glasgow Royal Infirmary, eventually becoming consultant general surgeon. He published several notable books and papers during his career.

Anderson died in 1982 in a fall from the roof of his house while carrying out a home repair.

Anderson's grandfather, Jamie Anderson, won The Open Championship in three consecutive years between 1877 and 1879.

== Publications ==
- John Maxwell Anderson, ed. (1970). The Biology and Surgery of Tissue Transplantation: Proceedings of a Conference Held in Glasgow on 20-21 March 1969. Blackwell Scientific. ISBN 0397601271.
- John Maxwell Anderson (1970). The biology and surgery of tissue transplantation. Blackwell Scientific. ISBN 063206210X.
- John Maxwell Anderson (1972). Nature's Transplant: The Transplantation Immunology of Viviparity. Butterworths. ISBN 0407326502.
