= Dion Forster =

South African clergyman (born 1972)

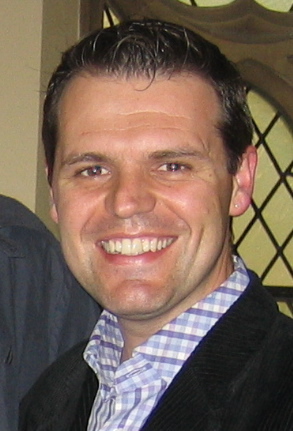
Dion Forster (2007)

Dion Angus Forster (born 14 January 1972 in Zimbabwe) is a South African academic and clergyman. He serves as University Research Professor of Public Theology and Ethics in the Faculty of Social Sciences and Humanities, in the School of Religion and Theology at the Vrije Universiteit Amsterdam.

He is a Full Professor (Extraordinary) in the Department of Systematic Theology and Ecclesiology, in the Faculty of Theology, Stellenbosch University where he previously served as full professor and Head of Department (Chair) until October 2023. In addition, Forster is a research fellow at Wesley House, Cambridge, and an Associate of the Allan Gray Centre for Values Based Leadership at the University of Cape Town, Graduate School of Business. Dion Forster is the current President of the Global Network for Public Theology, and the Chair of the Editorial Board of the International Journal for Public Theology (Brill).

He is an ordained Minister of the Methodist Church of Southern Africa, a theologian and author. He was formerly the Dean of the Seminary of the Methodist Church of Southern Africa, John Wesley College. Forster was the International Chairman of the 'EXPOSED – shining a light on corruption' campaign (a coalition of the World Evangelical Alliance, the Salvation Army, the International Bible Societies, Micah Challenge and Unashamedly Ethical).

== Education ==
He holds two PHD's. In 2006, he completed a Doctorate in Theology (neuroscience, identity and theology) at the University of South Africa (UNISA). In 2017, he completed a second PHD at Radboud University Nijmegen in New Testament studies with a focus on Social Identity Theory and the politics of forgiveness among Black and White South African Christians. He also holds the degrees of Master of Theology (2001), and Bachelor of Theology with Honours (Honours degree) (1997), from Rhodes University, and a post-graduate qualification in management from the University of Stellenbosch Business School.

== Teaching ==
He has taught Systematic Theology, New Testament and Ethics at John Wesley College, Ethics and Systematic Theology at the University of South Africa (UNISA), and New Testament at the University of Pretoria. He is currently on the full-time faculty of the Vrije Universiteit Amsterdam. Until October 2023 he was a full professor of Systematic Theology, Ethics and Public Theology, and the Director of the Beyers Naudé Centre for Public Theology, as well as the Chair of the Department of Systematic Theology and Ecclesiology at Stellenbosch University.

Dion Forster is a member of the Oxford Institute of Methodist Theological Studies, the Theological Society of South Africa and the South Africa Science and Religion Forum. He has lectured at various institutions across the world

== Research foci ==
- African Theology and the Southern African philosophy of ubuntu, social justice and human rights
- Public Theology and Theological Ethics with a focus on political ethics and economic ethics
- Theology and science, Human consciousness, religious consciousness, and individual identity, Neuroscience and Neurotheology, Artificial Intelligence and technology
- Integral (spirituality) with reference to the work of Ken Wilber
- Ecclesiology with an emphasis on Marketplace ministry and the Emerging church
- Methodism in South Africa, Methodist mission, Methodist spirituality, Wesleyan theology

== Publications: Academic Articles and Papers ==
- Aspects of the Cosmic Christ in the spirituality of Dom Bede Griffiths (adapted from Masters Thesis for the Bede Griffiths Trust 2003) – reworked and published as a book in 2007. Please see 'Christ at the centre...' below.
- To bomb or not to bomb? A Christian response to the war on Iraq (an article that was written for, and presented to, the Stellenbosch University Student Christian Association 2002)
- Spiritual Intelligence, the Ultimate Intelligence (paper presented at the Human Wellness Conference in Stellenbosch 2003)
- The Same-Sex Debate in the Methodist Church of Southern Africa (paper presented on behalf of the Doctrine Ethics and Worship Commission of the Methodist Church of Southern Africa to the Bishops of the Methodist Church of Southern Africa 2004).
- Christianity, inclusivity, and homosexuality: An interpretation of responses to the Methodist Church of Southern Africa’s discussion document on same sex relationships. (An elective paper presented for John Wesley College's 10th Anniversary Conference in September 2004)
- Three empty promises: Understanding the role of the Church and Theological Education in the Methodist Church of Southern Africa. (presented at Duke Divinity School, Raleigh, North Carolina, and Garrett Evangelical Seminary, Chicago / Evanston Illinois – March / April 2005).
- Spiritual Quotient : a neuro-theological key to wellness and wholeness. (Paper read at the Theological Society of South Africa Annual Conference June 2005).
- Post-human Consciousness and the Evolutionary Cosmology of Pierre Teilhard de Chardin. (Published in 'Grace and Truth' – the Journal of Creative reflection of the Catholic Church of South Africa, July 2005).
- War: A case study in theological reflection (Video presentation at the 19th World Methodist Council in Seoul, South Korea – Theological Education committee).
- Identity in relationship: The ethics of ubuntu as an answer to the impasse of individual consciousness (Paper presented at the South African science and religion Forum – Published in the book The impact of knowledge systems on human development in Africa. du Toit, CW (ed), Pretoria, Research institute for Religion and Theology (University of South Africa) 2007:245-289). ISBN 978-1-86888-454-4.
- Self validating consciousness in strong artificial intelligence: An African theological contribution. Pretoria: Doctoral Dissertation, University of South Africa / UNISA.
- Ordained Deacons and the sacraments in the Methodist Church of Southern Africa: Emissary servanthood. Forster, DA. 2007. Prepared for the Doctrine, Ethics and Worship Commission of the Methodist Church of Southern Africa.
- More red than green – a response to global warming and the environment from within the Methodist Church of Southern Africa. Forster, DA in The Epworth Review – the Journal of Methodist ecclesiology and mission Vol 35, No 2 (2008).
- Prophetic witness and social action as holiness in the Methodist Church of Southern Africa's mission. (Article published in Studia Historiae Ecclesiasticae July 2008:411-434, VOL XXXIV, No.1).
- Revolution or evolution? Considering the impact of 'emerging church' conversations on the mission and ecclesiology of established churches. Hugh Price Hughes annual lecture delivered at Hinde Street, London, March 2009.
- The Role of the Church in Reconciliation in South Africa. Forster, DA in Lausanne World Pulse, April 2010. Lausanne Congress on World Evangelization. Wheaton Illinois.
- The Church has AIDS: Towards a positive theology for an HIV+ Church. Forster, DA in The Epworth Review – the Journal of Methodist ecclesiology and mission Vol 1, No 2, (May, 2010:6-24).
- How technology is changing, or should change, the way in which the Gospel is shared. Forster, DA in Lausanne World Pulse, June/July 2010. Lausanne Congress on World Evangelization. Wheaton Illinois.
- A generous ontology: Identity as a process of intersubjective discovery – An African theological contribution. Forster, DA (2010) in HTS Teologiese Studies/Theological Studies, 66(1), Art. #731, 12 pages. doi:10.4102/hts.v66i1.731
- African relational ontology, individual identity, and Christian theology: An African theological contribution towards an integrated relational ontological identity. Forster, DA in Theology (SPCK) VOL CXIII No 874 July/August (2010:243-253).
- Mandela and the Methodists: Faith, fallacy and fact. Forster, DA in Studia Historiae Ecclesiasticae August 2014, vol 40, Supplement, pp 87–115.
- Called to work: A descriptive analysis of Call42’s research on faith and work in South Africa Forster, DA in Koers – Bulletin for Christian Scholarship November 2014, vol 79, Issue 2, pp 1–9.

== Publications: Books and Chapters ==
- An Introduction to Wesleyan Spirituality. Wesley Society Series, no. 6. Methodist Publishing House, 2001.
- Identity in relationship: The ethics of ubuntu as an answer to the impasse of individual consciousness (Paper presented at the South African science and religion Forum – Published in the book The impact of knowledge systems on human development in Africa. du Toit, CW (ed), Pretoria, Research institute for Religion and Theology (University of South Africa) (2007:245-289). ISBN 978-1-86888-454-4.
- Upon the Lord's sermon on the mount – discourse 8 (a contemporary exposition of John Wesley's sermon on stewardship and the use of money from an African Liberation Theology perspective) in Shier Jones, A and Reisman, KD (eds.) 44 Sermons to Serve the Present Age (2007), London: Epworth. ISBN 978-0-7162-0631-6
- A prayer guide for use during examinations. Forster, DA. 2007. AcadSA Publishers. Kempton Park. ISBN 978-1-920212-21-6
- Christ at the centre – Discovering the Cosmic Christ in the spirituality of Dom Bede Griffiths. Forster, DA. 2007. AcadSA Publishers. Kempton Park. ISBN 978-1-920212-24-7
- An uncommon spiritual path – finding Jesus beyond conventional Christianity. Forster, DA. 2008. MMA Publishers. Pretoria. ISBN 978-0-9814026-1-1
- Methodism in Southern Africa: A celebration of Wesleyan Mission Forster, DA and Bentley, W. 2008. AcadSA Publishers, Kempton Park. ISBN 978-1-920212-29-2
- What are we thinking? Reflections on Church and Society from Southern African Methodists. Forster, DA and Bentley, W. 2008. Methodist Publishing House, Cape Town. ISBN 978-1-919883-52-6
- A world faith Forster, DA, in Shier Jones, A and Curran, L (eds.) Methodist Present Potential (2009:136-162), London: Epworth Press. ISBN 978-0-7162-0651-4
- Reading the same Bible and reaching different ethical conclusions: The Bible and Christian ethics by Forster, DA (2009:131-156) in What is a good life? An introduction to Christian Ethics in 21st century Africa. Kretzschmar, L; Bentley, W; van Niekerk, A (eds). Kempton Park, AcadSA Publishers ISBN 978-1-920212-40-7
- Transform your work life: Turn your ordinary day into an extraordinary calling Power, G and Forster, DA. 2010. Struik Christian Books. Cape Town. ISBN 978-1-4153-0935-3
- Resource Mobilization in Cape Town. Forster, DA. in Kingdom Stewardship: Occasional Papers Prepared by the Lausanne Resource Mobilization Working Group for Cape Town 2010 Mohamed, A, Elder, B & Grabil, S. Christian Library Press. ISBN 978-1-880595-79-4
- Empire, economics and apathy: A theological reflection on HIV/AIDS by Forster, DA (2011) in Alienation and Connection: Suffering in a Global Age. Withrow, L (ed). Lexington Books. ISBN 978-0-7391-3705-5
- Making disciples in a world parish: A Southern African perspective on mission as social action Forster, DA in Making Disciples in a Global Parish Wipf & Stock, NY, 2011, pp 39–47. ISBN 978-1-60899-880-7
- Between Capital and Cathedral: Essays on Church-State relationships by Bentley, W and Forster, DA (2012) University of South Africa Press. Pretoria. ISBN 978-1-86888-714-9
- God's Kingdom and the transformation of society Forster, DA in Between Capital and Cathedral: Essays on Church-State relationships Research Institute for Religion & Theology, UNISA, 2012, pp 73–88.
- The (im)possibility of forgiveness? An empirical intercultural Bible reading of Matthew 18:15-35 Forster, DA (2017), Beyers Naudé Centre Series on Public Theology Volume XI. SUN Press, Stellenbosch. ISBN 978-1-928357-52-0
