= Max Stackhouse =

American academic (1935–2016)

Max Lynn Stackhouse
- Born: July 29, 1935
- Died: January 30, 2016 (aged 80)
- Spouse: Jean Stackhouse
- Children: Dale Stackhouse, David Stackhouse

Academic background
- Education: DePauw University; Harvard Divinity School

Academic work
- Discipline: Christian ethics; Public theology; Globalization
- Institutions: Andover Newton Theological School; Princeton Theological Seminary

Max Lynn Stackhouse (July 29, 1935 – January 30, 2016) was the Rimmer and Ruth de Vries Professor of Reformed Theology and Public Life Emeritus at Princeton Theological Seminary. He was ordained in the United Church of Christ and was the president of the Berkshire Institute for Theology and the Arts.

He specialized in theological ethics and social life, Christianity and the ethics of the world religions, and public theology, and the mission of the churches. He taught courses on the place of faith in educational life, the theological implications of the arts, religion and journalism, and theology in relation to the environment. He was the first director of Princeton Theological Seminary's Abraham Kuyper Center for Public Theology.

== Academic life ==
Dr. Stackhouse retired from his position as the Stephen Colwell Professor of Christian Ethics (1993-2004), Director of the Project on Public Theology and the Rimmer and Ruth de Vries Professor of Reformed Theology and Public Life at Princeton Theological Seminary.

His doctoral dissertation at Harvard University (1961 - 1965) was entitled "Eschatology and Ethical Method in W. Rauschenbusch and H. Niebuhr." He has an M.A. and B.D. from Harvard Divinity School (1958 - 1961), and a B.A from DePauw University (1957).

Max L. Stackhouse was the Coordinating Editor of the Center of Theological Inquiry's groundbreaking God and Globalization project. The findings of the project are edited Stackhouse in partnership with Peter J. Paris, Don S. Browning, and Diane Obenchain and published in 4 volumes entitled God and Globalization by Trinity International Press and Continuum International Publishing Group. The three former volumes are multi-authored while the fourth volume is authored solely by Stackhouse, with a foreword written by the historian Justo Gonzalez. In the final interpretive volume, Stackhouse argues for a view of Christian theology that, in critical dialogue with other world religions and philosophies, is able to engage the new world situation, play a critical role in reforming the "powers" that are becoming more diverse and autonomous, and generate a social ethic for the 21st century.

He also served as the "Herbert Gezork Professor of Christian Social Ethics" at Andover Newton Theological School for almost 30 years, as well as the Robert and Carolyn Frederick Distinguished Visiting Professor of Ethics at DePauw University during the spring semester of 2006-07. Also, He was a visiting professor at United Theological College, Bangalore. In 2010, a collection of essays was published to honor Stackhouse and his works in public theology entitled Public Theology for a Global Society: Essays in Honor of Max L. Stackhouse, edited by Deidre King Hainsworth and Scott R. Paeth (Wm. B. Eerdmans Publishing, 2010).

Professional Memberships and Offices:
President, 1986-87 Society of Christian Ethics
President, 1982-92 James Luther Adams Foundation
Editorial Board, The Christian Century
Editorial Board, Journal of Political Theology
Editorial Board, Religion in Eastern Europe
Member, American Theological Society
Member, American Academy of Religion
Member, American Society for Political and Legal Philosophy
Member, Société Européenne de Culture
Member, Amnesty International USA

Past Church Activities:
China Academic Consortium (Christian Scholars Exchange and Research Program) B Board Member
World Reformed Alliance - Roman Catholic Bilateral Consultations
World Council of Churches Conference on Faith, Science and the Future
Moscow Interfaith Peace Conference-National Council of Churches & Russian Orthodox Church
Evangelische Kirche der Union-UCC Working Group, Board for World Ministries
World Reformed Alliance-Mennonite Bilateral Consultations
Delegate, American Committee for Human Rights, Mission Team to the Philippines
Delegate, Consultation on the German Churches and Unification, Munich

== Personal life ==
He and his wife, Jean Stackhouse have two sons: Dale and David. He died on 30 January 2016 at his home in West Stockbridge, Massachusetts. His memorial service was held on 13 February at The First Congregational Church of Stockbridge, MA.

== Selected publications ==
=== Articles ===
- "A Premature Postmodern." First Things 106 (October 2000): 19-22.
- "Spheres of Management." Theology Today 60, 3 (October 2003): 370-383.
- "Civil Religion, Political Theology and Public Theology: What's the Difference?" Political Theology 5, 3 (July 2004): 275-293.
- "For Fairer Trade: Justice and the Global Market." Christian Century 124, 16 (August 7, 2007): 28-31.
- "The Christian Ethic of Love." Journal of Religious Ethics 35, 4 (December, 2007): 700-711.
- "Framing the Global Ethos." Theology Today 66, 4 (January 2010): 415-429.
- "Global Engagement: How My Mind Has Changed." Christian Century 128, 8 (April 19, 2011): 30-34.

=== Chapters ===
- "Christianity and the Prospects for a New Global Order." In Christian Political Ethics, ed. John A. Coleman. Princeton: Princeton University Press, 2008. ISBN 9780691131405
- "Christianity, Civil Society, and the State: A Protestant Response." In Christian Political Ethics, ed. John A. Coleman. Princeton: Princeton University Press, 2008. ISBN 9780691131405
- "Ethics and Eschatology." In Oxford Handbook of Eschatology, ed. Jerry L. Walls. Oxford: Oxford University Press, 2008. ISBN 9780195170498

=== Books ===
- Shaping Public Theology: Selections from the Writings of Max L. Stackhouse. Edited by Scott R. Paeth, E. Harold Breitenberg, and Hak Joon Lee. Grand Rapids, MI: Eerdmans, 2014. ISBN 9780802868817
- God and Globalization (Volume 1): Religion and the Powers of the Common Life. Edited by Max L. Stackhouse and Peter J. Paris. Harrisburg, PA: Trinity Press: 2000.
- God and Globalization (Volume 2): The Spirit and the Modern Authorities. Edited by Max L. Stackhouse and Don S. Browning. Harrisburg, PA: Trinity Press: 2001. ISBN 1563383306
- God and Globalization (Volume 3): Christ and the Dominions of Civilization. Edited by Max L. Stackhouse and Diane B. Obenchain. Harrisburg, PA: Trinity Press: 2002. ISBN 1563383713
- God and Globalization (Volume 4): Globalization and Grace. Edited by Max L. Stackhouse. New York: Continuum, 2007. ISBN 9780826428851

== See also ==
- Hainsworth, Deirdre King, and Scott R. Paeth (Ed). Public Theology for a Global Society: Essays in Honor of Max L. Stackhouse. Grand Rapids, MI: W.B. Eerdmans, 2010. ISBN 9780802865076
