= John Wesley College =

- Established: 6 February 1994
- Affiliations: Methodist
- Principal: Neville Richardson
- Dean: Dion Forster
- Location: Pretoria, Gauteng, South Africa

John Wesley College was the seminary of the Methodist Church of Southern Africa situated at Kilnerton in Pretoria, South Africa. It was most commonly referred to as John Wesley College Kilnerton. It opened at Kilnerton in 1994, and was replaced by the Seth Mokitimi Methodist Seminary, located in Pietermaritzburg, KwaZulu-Natal, in January 2009, There is also a John Wesley College in Fiji, South Pacific.

== History ==
The facility was first established as Kilnerton Institution in 1886 and situated in Weavind Park, a suburb of Tshwane (Pretoria), and was named after the Rev John Kilner, secretary of the Wesleyan Methodist Missionary Society who encouraged the formation of an indigenous clergy in South Africa. The goal was to provide education for the local people. There was also a request from local chiefs for the Methodist Church to provide land where they could safely settle. When Kilnerton Institution was established these people settled at what became Kilnerton Village. Kilnerton served the community with a primary school, a high school, a training college or normal school as well as with a clinic and special domestic science course. Their spiritual needs were served by the services held in the chapel on the hill.

== Revival ==
Kilnerton became the site of the revival of John Wesley College when the Federal Theological Seminary of Southern Africa closed, opening its doors on 6 February 1994. This occasion also marked the revival of Kilnerton as a training institution after 32 years. With the closure of the Department of Theology and Religion at Rhodes University in 2000, John Wesley College Kilnerton became the only centre for residential theological education in the Methodist Church of Southern Africa.

== Notable alumni ==
- Dikgang Moseneke, Deputy Chief Justice of South Africa, William Frederick Nkomo, Thomas Masekela, Enos Makhubedu, Miriam Makeba, Lilian Ngoyi, Rev Sedumedi Molope, and Sefako Makgatho
