= Federal Theological Seminary of Southern Africa =

The Federal Theological Seminary of Southern Africa a.k.a. Fedsem was a multi-denominational theological seminary in South Africa, and an experiment in ecumenical theological education.

== Origins ==
It was opened in Alice, Transkei in 1963, in response to apartheid legislation such as the Group Areas Act which forced theological colleges for black students that were situated in "whiter" areas to close or move.

Among the colleges that were threatened by this legislation were St Peter's Theological College in Rosettenville (Anglican), John Wesley College in Kilnerton, Pretoria (Methodist) and Adams College in Amanzimtoti (Congregationalist). The denominations affected by this got together and decided to build a new joint seminary on land next to Fort Hare University College at Alice in the Transkei. They opted for the model of English collegiate universities, like Oxford, Cambridge and Durham, where each college functioned independently, but shared resources such as teaching staff and libraries. Each college had its own accommodation for students and staff, and its own chapel.

The colleges that opened in 1963 were: St Peter's (Anglican), John Wesley College (Methodist), St Columba's (Presbyterian), and Adams United (Congregationalist).

The first principal was Father Aelred Stubbs, who stepped aside after eight years to make way for an African principal.

On 26 November 1974, the government issued an expropriation order, giving the Seminary three months to vacate the land and the buildings. The seminary was obliged to move, first to Umtata in Transkei, then in Edendale and finally a new campus was opened in August 1980 at Imbali, Pietermaritzburg.

Fedsem closed in 1993.
