= New College, St Andrews =

College of the University of St Andrews

New College
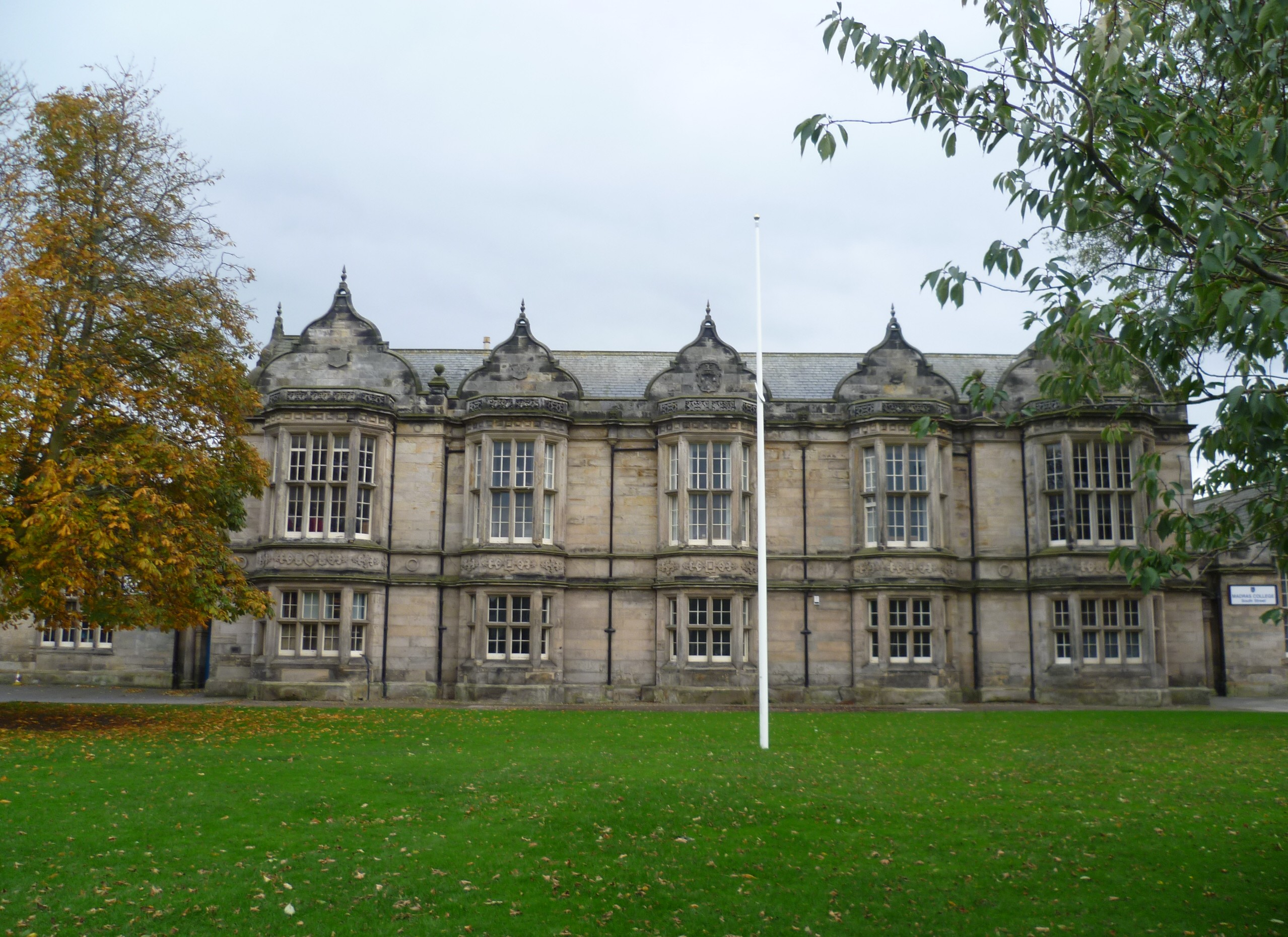
- Former Madras College
- Type: College
- Established: announced 2022; 4 years ago
- Affiliations: University of St Andrews
- Location: St Andrews, Fife, Scotland; 56.337°N 2.7983°W
- Website: www.st-andrews.ac.uk/development/making-waves/new-college/

New College is a planned new college of the University of St Andrews, first announced in 2022, to be located on the former site of Madras College, which the university acquired in 2021. It will be the fourth college at the university, after United College, St Mary's College and St Leonard's College. The college will house the newly established St Andrews Business School, formed from the Schools of Economics and Finance, and Management, alongside the School of International Relations.

It is expected to cost £142 million, and will be funded primarily through philanthropy from alumni and private donors as part of the University's "Making Waves" campaign. The architectural firm WilkinsonEyre were appointed to design the project.

== History ==
The plans for a new college were first announced by the university in 2022, having acquired the former site of Madras College the previous year; the central building of which is Grade A-listed.

In May 2025, the Garfield Weston Foundation made a £5 million donation, bringing the total amount raised to £41 million. The university also requested planning permission to cover the courtyard of Madras College.

In January 2026, the Fife Council planning committee unanimously granted planning permission for the development of the site comprising a new entrance pavilion, a 250-seat lecture theatre, a glazed enclosure over the central courtyard, and extensive renovations and extensions to the existing buildings. In addition to the donation from Garfield Weston, further philanthropic funds of £15 million from the Oak Foundation and $5 million from long-standing US supporters and St Andrews residents, Wendy and George David, were reported.
