= Margaret Forrester =

- Born: c. 1939
- Alma mater: New College
- Awards: honorary doctorate

Margaret Forrester (born Margaret McDonald) became a missionary, Scottish church minister and writer. She was one of six women who successfully campaigned for the right of women to be ordained in the Church of Scotland. She supported gay-rights within the church.

== Life ==
Forrester had been educated in Edinburgh before she studied theology at New College, Oxford with an ambition to be a minister. In the year before she graduated she was elected to be the University Theological Society's president.

In 1967 six women wrote an open letter to call on the Church of Scotland to allow the ordination of women. The six were Mary Weir, Claude Marie Barbour, Elizabeth Hewat, Mary Levison, Sheila White (later Sheila Spence and Forrester and they wrote an open letter requesting that women should be accepted as ministers in the Church of Scotland.

Levison had been the first to petition for the acceptance of women as ministers in the Church of Scotland in 1963. Forrester had witnessed the debate which decided to nor allow women. Every year the request was renewed and in 1967 the six found that they were not allowed to lobby the men who were making the decision so they decided to hold a press conference. The YMCA lent a room and the press were invited but they were not expected in any numbers. On the day the room was packed and the six of them, and their petition, were in the press.

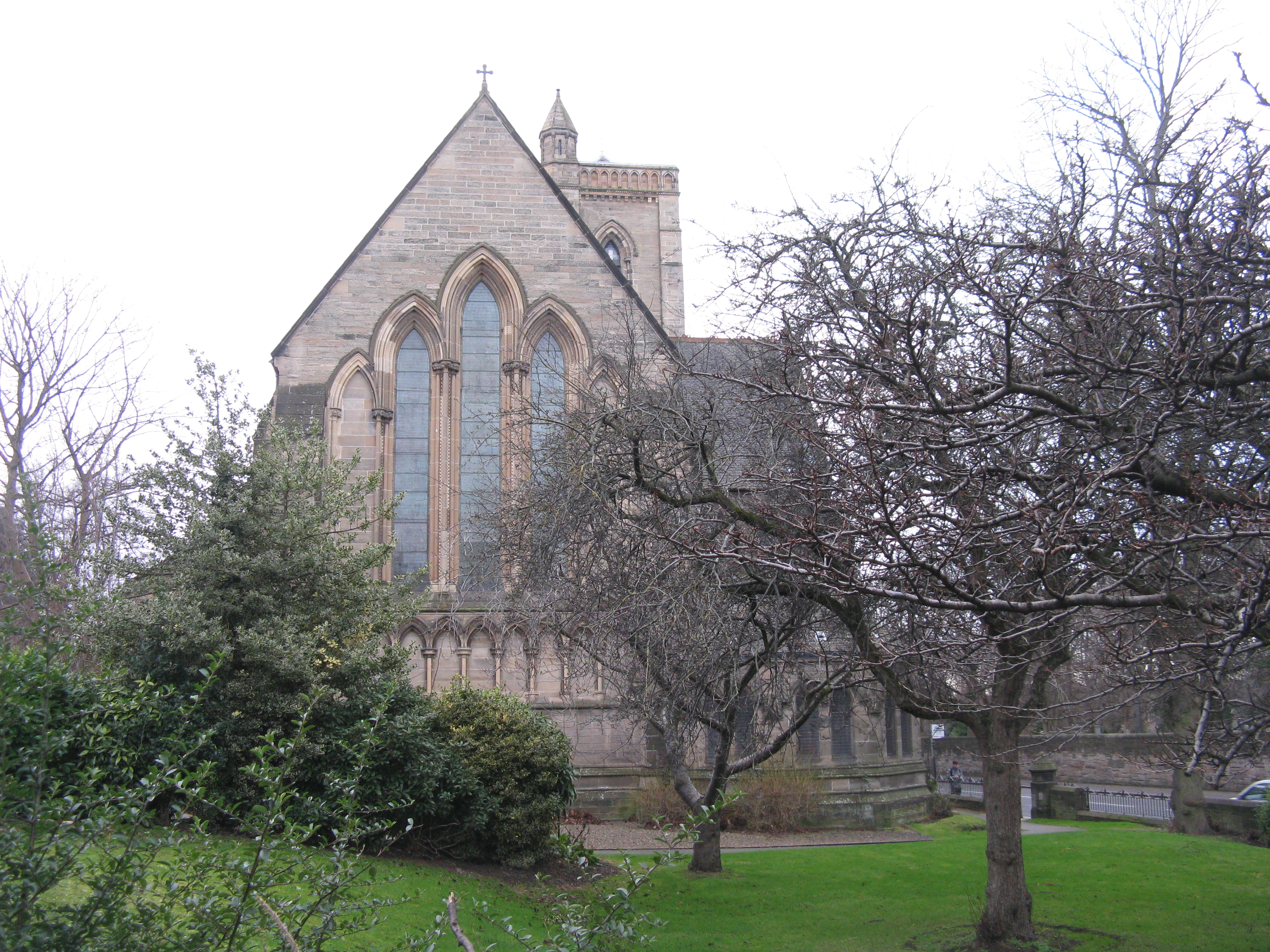
St. Michael's Parish Church for 22 years

Her mother in law, Isobel Forrester, was an enthusiastic supporter of the ordination of women. When the approval was given for women to be ordained Isobel sent a telegram to her daughter in law who was then in India telling Margaret of the "sweeping victory" on 22 May 1968. Margaret was ordained.

Forrester spent years in India where she again could not be a minister but she could teach. She came back to Edinburgh in 1978 and she became the minister in Edinburgh's St Michael parish. She would lead there for 22 years. During this time she attracted controversy when she blessed a lesbian couple in the 1990s. It was speculated that this act had prevented her from becoming the moderator of her church.

Forrester became a writer for children.

== Private life ==
Forrester, who had been born Margaret McDonald, married Duncan Baillie Forrester, who became a professor of theology at the University of Edinburgh. Her husband died in 2016 aged 83. They had two children: Donald and Catriona.
