= Donald Macpherson Baillie =

British theologian and minister (1887–1954)

Donald Macpherson Baillie (5 November 1887 – 31 October 1954) was a Scottish theologian, ecumenist, and parish minister.

Baillie was ordained in 1918. Before his ordination he had worked an assistant in North Morningside Church, Edinburgh and the YMCA in France and at St. Boswell's Church in Edinburgh. After his ordination, he served as the minister of Bervie United Free Church from 1918-1923, followed by St. John's, Cupar until 1930 and then at St. Columba's, Kilmacolm until 1934. From 1911 to 1914, Bailee was an assistant to the Professor of Moral Philosophy at the University of Edinburgh. He was appointed Kerr lecturer at the University of Glasgow in 1923, delivering lectures in 1926. This was followed by his appointment as a professor of divinity at St Mary's College, University of St Andrews. In 1935, he became Professor of Systematic Theology.

Baillie also worked as internal examiner at St Andrews, as an external examiner for the University of Edinburgh, and as a visiting lecturer at the University of Liverpool and the San Francisco Theological Seminary. In 1948, he co-founded the Scottish Churches Ecumenical Association. In 1933, he was given an Honorary Doctorate of Divinity by the University of St Andrews. His Kerr lectures at Glasgow were turned into the book Faith in God and its Christian Consummation (1927). His more famous work was God was in Christ (1948). Several of his sermons were gathered into two posthumous volumes, To Whom Shall We Go? (1955) and Out of Nazareth (1958).

== Early life and education ==
Baillie was born in the Free Church of Scotland manse in Gairloch, Ross-shire, on 5 November 1887, the son of Rev. John Baillie (1829-1891) and Annie Macpherson. He was a younger brother to John Baillie (1886-1960), and older brother to Peter. His father died when Donald was three, and his mother moved her three sons to Inverness. While there, Donald was educated at Inverness Royal Academy.

The family later moved to Edinburgh, to allow the boys to continue their education, with Donald enrolling at Edinburgh University in 1905. Donald began in literary studies, but like his older brother he soon changed to philosophy, winning first class medals in both metaphysics and moral philosophy as well as the George Saintsbury Prize for English Verse. He matriculated at New College, Edinburgh in 1909, where he concentrated on theological and biblical studies with H. R. MacKintosh, H. A. A. Kennedy, and Alexander Martin.

He also spent two semesters at the German universities in Marburg under Wilhelm Herrmann and Adolf Julicher and in Heidelberg under Ernst Troeltsch and Johannes Weiss. Baillie completed his ministerial training at New College in March 1913.

== Career ==
Baillie began his own pastoral work as an assistant in North Morningside Church, Edinburgh and in 1917 volunteered to serve with the Young Men's Christian Association (YMCA) in France. He had to be relieved of his duties there due to a chronic asthmatic condition which plagued him all his life. He then filled an interim position at St. Boswell's Church in Edinburgh.

From 1911 until 1914, he was assistant to the Professor of Moral Philosophy.

=== Ministry ===
He was ordained into the United Free Church of Scotland in 1918 and was minister of Bervie United Free Church until 1923. He then moved to St. John's, Cupar he was there until 1930 (by which time, the United Free Church had mostly merged back into the Church of Scotland in 1929) and then at St. Columba's, Kilmacolm until 1934.

=== Other work ===
Donald was appointed Kerr lecturer at the University of Glasgow in 1923, delivering lectures in 1926.

During his time in Cupar, he wrote Faith in God and its Christian Consummation (1927), which was based on Kerr Lectures. This led to his appointment as a professor of divinity at St Mary's College, University of St Andrews, where he spent the remainder of his life.

In 1935 he became Professor of Systematic Theology at the University of St Andrews, where he had been Additional examiner for the BD degree in Divinity and Ecclesiastical History from 1921-1924, and which had awarded him an Honorary DD in 1933. Other academic positions included External Examiner for the BD in Divinity at the University of Edinburgh from 1933, Forwood lecturer in the Philosophy of Religion at the University of Liverpool, 1947, and Moore lecturer at the San Francisco Theological Seminary, 1952.

In 1948 he, Isobel Forrester and his brother John formed the Scottish Churches Ecumenical Association, which in 1950 merged with the Dollarbeg group which had organised ecumenical conferences since 1945 or 1946.

His more famous work was God was in Christ (1948), which explored the paradox of grace, and applied it to incarnational theology. The book went through five printings, including a separate German edition.

Several of his sermons were gathered into two posthumous volumes, To Whom Shall We Go? (1955) and Out of Nazareth (1958).

== Death ==
Baillie died of emphysema in Maryfield Hospital, Dundee, on October 31, 1954, at the age of 67 years. He was still in post of Professor of Systematic Theology at the time of his death.
