= Public theology =

Dialogue with the church and society

Public theology is the Christian engagement and dialogue within the church and especially with the larger society. It seeks the welfare of the state and a fair society for all by engaging issues of common interest to build the common good. This is Christian theology that talks with society not just to society. This is done by presenting a Christian position in a way that can be publicly understood and thereby open to public debate and critical enquiry.

== Key developments ==
The term public theology was first coined by Martin Marty to contrast against civil religion. Civil religion looks more generally at religion in relation to the state, whereas public theology is rooted in a Christian standpoint and identity as it considers its contributions to the society and the state.

David Tracy asked what the "public" in "public theology" meant. He identifies three publics that public theology should try to engage in dialogue with: the society, the academy and the church. He suggests that, given these publics, the language and rationale used should be openly accessible by all and not couched in theologically elitist terms. Since Tracy identified these three publics, others have suggested the addition of other "publics" such as economics, law, the market, media, and other religious communities.

Harold Breitenberg suggests that most literature on public theology falls into one of three classes. Firstly, there are studies on key public theologians and how they understand the topic. Secondly, there are discussions on the nature and the shape of public theology. Lastly, there is "constructive public theology" which is the actual doing of public theology. The first two aim at developing public theology as a field of study while the last one is the practical application of it.

Some notable figures in this field are Dietrich Bonhoeffer, William Temple, Martin Luther King Jr., Desmond Tutu, Dion Forster, Jürgen Moltmann, Ronald Thiemann, Dorothee Soelle, John Courtney Murray, Reinhold Niebuhr, Duncan Forrester, Max Stackhouse, and Sebastian C. H. Kim.

== Common traits ==
While there is no authoritative definition or corpus of books on public theology, there are several common traits which are observable in varying degrees. Katie Day and Sebastian Kim note six common "marks" of public theology. Firstly, public theology is often incarnational. It is not confined to the church but meant to be relevant to people outside of it as well. It is meant to be realistic and concerned with all aspects of societal life. Secondly, there is often discussion over which public(s) to engage and the nature of the public sphere. Thirdly, it is interdisciplinary because it draws on other fields of study in order to be more relevant to society. Fourthly, public theology always involves dialogue and critique from both the church itself and society as well. Fifthly, it has a global perspective because many issues affect countries across borders, such as immigration, climate change, refugees, etc. Lastly, public theology is performed, not just printed in books. This field of theology is not theorized first then applied, but it is a theology that develops and evolves while being expressed in society.

== Compared with political theology ==
Public theology and political theology share many common points. They have overlapping concerns for social justice and Christian engagement in the public and political sphere. They also share similar concerns that the Christian faith is more than individual piety. It has a role to play in building societal peace, justice, and the common good.

However, they differ in many ways as well. Political theology tends to be more radical in its pursuit for societal transformation, sometimes compelled by a sense of crisis. Public theology, on the other hand, is more moderate. It seeks to bring change gradually through social analysis, public dialogue, and shaping the moral fabric of society. So political theology tends to be more revolutionary while public theology is more reformative.

Political theology is directed more towards the government or the state, whereas public theology is more towards civil society. This is because political theology is more concerned with a just political system whereas public theology is more concerned for a just society for everyone, open dialogue, and the building a common ground.

== Criticism ==
A common critique of public theology is the overly broad range of issues it is concerned with. Because it seeks to engage in all issues that concern the society, public theology may find itself spread too thin across these issues. As a result, it may fail to engage the issues with sufficient depth and academic rigour because it lacks the necessary subject matter expertise. This overt broadness may also cause public theology to lack a focused approach and method because each issue may require a different methodology.

Another critique public theology faces is the inherent difficulty in retaining its Christian distinctiveness while being publicly relevant. Too much weight in either direction may cause it to be irrelevant to the public or bearing no distinct Christian witness. The tension may be ideal in theory, but difficult to achieve in reality.

== See also ==
- Centre for Theology and Public Issues
- International Journal of Public Theology
- Liberation theology
- Public philosophy
