= Claude Marie Barbour =

Minister of the Presbyterian Church

Reverend Claude Marie Barbour
- Occupation: Theologian
- Organization: Catholic Theological Union

Claude Marie Barbour is a minister of the Presbyterian Church (USA). She was among the first female ministers in the denomination, being ordained in 1974 in Gary, Indiana.

== Education ==
Barbour has a Master of Sacred Theology (STM) from New York Theological Seminary, and a Doctorate in Sacred Theology (STD) from Garrett-Evangelical Theological Seminary

== Career ==
Barbour was one of six alumnae of the New College, Edinburgh, who wrote an open letter to the General Assembly of the Church of Scotland in 1967. Other proponents included Dr Elizabeth G.K. Hewat, Mary Levison (née Lusk), Mary Weir, Sheila Spence (née White) and Margaret Forrester. The group informed the Assembly that there was no valid theological reason to oppose admission of women, and held a press conference as they were prevented from lobbying directly. The decision to allow female ministry was made on the 22 May 1968.

Barbour's ministry involves a great deal of intercultural and interreligious work.

Barbour retired from the Catholic Theological Union in 2016 after 40 years on the faculty. She remains Professor Emerita of World Mission, and continues to participate in CTU activities

== Works ==
- “The Return: Returning to the Place of Pain.” In New Theology Review, Vol. 17, Number 1, 2004.
- “Mission as Accompaniment.” with Eleanor Doidge in Catholic Mission 1910-2010, edited by Stephen Bevans, Oxford, UK: Regnum Books, 2013.
- “Plural Spiritualities and Dual Religious Belonging” with Robert Schreiter. In Plural Spiritualities: North American Experiences, edited by Robert J. Schreiter, 75-89. Washington, DC: The Council for Research in Values and Philosophy, 2015.
- “Seeking Justice and Shalom in the City.” International Review of Mission, vol. 73, no. 291, 1984, pp. 303–09, https://doi.org/10.1111/j.1758-6631.1984.tb03281.x.
- Barbour, Claude Marie, Peggy DesJarlait, Eleanor Doidge, and Amy Carr. "Gospel, Culture, Healing and Reconciliation: A Shalom Conversation". Mission Studies 16.2 (1999): 135-150. https://doi.org/10.1163/15733831-90000011b Web.
