= Elizabeth G. K. Hewat =

Scottish missionary (1895–1968)

Elizabeth Hewat
- Elizabeth, center
- Born: 16 September 1895; Prestwick, Scotland
- Died: 13 October 1968 (aged 73); Edinburgh
- Education: New College, University of Edinburgh
- Occupations: Missionary and historian

Elizabeth Glendinning Kirkwood Hewat (16 September 1895 – 13 October 1968) was the first woman to graduate BD and PhD at New College, University of Edinburgh, a missionary, a campaigner for women's equality in the Church of Scotland, and a historian of Scottish missions.

== Life and career ==
Hewat was born on 16 September 1895 in Prestwick, Scotland to Elizabeth Glendinning and the Rev. Kirkwood Hewat, the United Free Church minister at Prestwick. Her education began at the girls' school Wellington School in Ayr and she went on to gain an MA at the University of Edinburgh in history and philosophy.

Her first academic position was as assistant lecturer in history at the University of St Andrews. She then moved to the UFC Women's Missionary College in Edinburgh where she taught between 1922 and 1926. In Edinburgh, she was one of the first women to study at New College and became the first woman to graduate BD from the college in 1926, coming top of her class.

Hewat believed that in order to fully prepare for missionary work that she should be ordained by the church. This led to a debate on women's ordination during the 1926 United Free Church General Assembly, however, the motion was not passed. Vera Kenmure was ordained and became a pastor in Partick's Congregational church in 1928 and she was ordained in 1929.

Hewat continued to argue for women's equality in the Christian church, writing in 1931, "women in the church hold a subordinate position; and women of today ask why ... Of one thing they are certain, and it is this, that it is not Christ who is barring the way."

Despite the refusal of ordination, Hewat began her missionary work by joining her sister in China. Once there, she was a teaching missionary and followed her own scholarly interests by researching comparative literature in Hebrew and Confucian Wisdom. Following her time in China, she returned to Edinburgh to work as an unpaid assistant at North Merchiston Church and to complete her PhD at the University of Edinburgh.

In 1935, she moved to Mumbai to become Professor of History at Wilson College and remained there until 1956. She was an elder in the United Church of North India.

In 1967 six women wrote an open letter to call on the Church of Scotland to allow the ordination of women. The six were Hewat, Margaret Forrester, Claude Marie Barbour, Mary Lusk (née Levison), Mary Weir and Sheila White (later Reverend Sheila Spence). Mary Lusk had been the first to petition for the acceptance of women as ministers in the Church of Scotland in 1963. Every year the request was renewed and in 1967 the six found that they were not allowed to lobby the men who were making the decision—so they decided to hold a press conference. The YMCA lent them a room and the press were invited but they were not expected in any numbers. On the day the room was packed and the six and their petition was in the press.

The debate continued in 1967 and on 22 May 1968 women's ordination was approved. Hewat died on 13 October 1968 in Edinburgh.

== Works ==
- Hewat, Elizabeth G.K. (1933). Comparison of Hebrew and Chinese wisdom, as exemplified in the Book of Proverbs and the Analects of Confucius (PhD thesis). University of Edinburgh. hdl:1842/10271.
- Hewat, Elizabeth G.K. (1960). Vision and achievement, 1796-1956: a history of the foreign missions of the churches united in the Church of Scotland. London; Edinburgh: Nelson.
- Hewat, Elizabeth G.K. (1967). Meeting Jehovah's Witnesses: a study of Jehovah's Witnesses in Scotland and elsewhere. Edinburgh: St Andrews Press.
