= Isobel Forrester =

- Born: 30 June 1895; Glen Lyon
- Died: 30 August 1976 (aged 81); York
- Alma mater: Lady Margaret Hall
- Occupation: Activist
- Children: Duncan B. Forrester

Isobel Forrester born Isobel Margaret Stewart McColl (1895 – 1976) was a Scottish born ecumenist. She was chair and an active member of the Scottish Churches Ecumenical Association.

== Life ==
Forrester was born at the manse in Glenlyon. She was the first child of Jane Mary (Jeannie) (born Baillie) and John McColl. Sir Walter Scott described Glen Lyon as the "longest, loneliest and loveliest glen in Scotland". Her family had to leave the manse in 1904 because of a rift in her father's church.

She and her family moved to Edinburgh where she attended St George's School until 1913 when a scholarship took her to Lady Margaret Hall, Oxford to study English. She returned to Scotland in 1917 with a third class degree and returned to St George's School to teach.

In 1948 John Baillie, Forrester, and John's brother, Donald, formed the Scottish Churches Ecumenical Association, which in 1950 merged with the Dollarbeg group which had organised ecumenical conferences since 1945 or 1946. The annual conferences had been created in response to an inititiative by the World Council of Churches and its focus was the role of women with the church and they discussed important social, political, and religious issues. However her three decades of work and leadership was constrained by organisations and she worked within and beyond these groups.

She was chair and an active member of the Scottish Churches Ecumenical Association. She was an enthusiastic supporter of the ordination of women. When the approval was given for women to be ordained she sent a telegram to her daughter in law Margaret Forrester in India telling her of the "sweeping victory" on 22 May 1968. Margaret was ordained and she became a writer for children.

She died in York on 30 August 1976 and her funeral and cremation was in Edinburgh on 4 September 1976. Papers relating to her book and correspondence are in the University of Edinburgh.

== Private life ==
She married William Forrester who was a theologian. The last of their five children was Duncan Baillie Forrester. He was born in 1933 and he became a professor of theology at the University of Edinburgh.
