= William Storrar =

The Reverend William Storrar
- Born: William F. Storrar

Ecclesiastical career
- Religion: Christianity (Presbyterian)
- Church: Church of Scotland
- Ordained: 1984

Academic background
- Education: University of Edinburgh

Academic work
- Discipline: Theology
- Sub-discipline: Practical theology
- Institutions: University of Aberdeen; University of Glasgow; University of Edinburgh; Center of Theological Inquiry

William F. Storrar is a Scottish Christian theologian who is the Director of Center of Theological Inquiry, known for his contribution on public theology.

== Biography ==
He obtained his Doctor of Philosophy degree in practical theology at New College, University of Edinburgh, in 1993. He was ordained a minister in the Church of Scotland in 1984 and has served as a parish minister in Glasgow and Carluke for eight years.

In 1992, he started working as a lecturer in practical theology at the University of Aberdeen, followed by being a senior lecturer at the University of Glasgow in 1998. In 2000, he was appointed Director of Centre for Theology and Public Issues and Chair of Christian Ethics and Practical Theology at New College and has worked until 2005. He was the co-founder of the Global Network for Public Theology. Since 2005, he has taken up the post of Director of the Center of Theological Inquiry.

He was at the editorial board of the International Journal of Public Theology and was the chair of Common Cause at the Church of Scotland in the 1990s.

When Rev. Gordon Kennedy was appointed as Moderator of the General Assembly from May 2026-May 2027, he was one of two ministers who covered the care of his parish of Edinburgh: Craiglockhart in his absence.

== Selected works ==
- Storrar, William (1982), No Room, No Birth, Some Magi, in Hearn, Sheila G. (ed.). Cencrastus No. 10, Autumn 1982, pp. 3–8, ISSN 0264-0856
- Storrar, William (1990), Scottish Identity: A Christian Vision. Edinburgh: Handsel. ISBN 9781871828016

=== Edited works ===
- Storrar, William and Iain R. Torrance (1995). Human Genetics: A Christian Perspective. Edinburgh: St. Andrew Press.
- Storrar, William and Peter Donald (2003). God in Society: Doing Social Theology in Scotland Today. Edinburgh: Saint Andrew Press. ISBN 9780715208038
- Storrar, William and Andrew Morton (2004). Public Theology for the 21st Century. T&T Clark. ISBN 9780567088925
- Storrar, William, Peter J. Casarella and Paul Louis Metzger (2011). A World for All? Global Civil Society in Political Theory and Trinitarian Theology. Grand Rapids, MI: William B Eerdmans. ISBN 9780802827425
- Storrar, William, Katie Day and Esther McIntosh (2013). Yours the Power: Faith-Based Organizing in the USA. Leiden: Brill. ISBN 9789004246003
