= Sebastian Kim =

Korean theologian

Sebastian Chang Hwan Kim (born 18 October 1955) is a Korean theologian specialized in public theology and Korean Christianity. He is currently Professor of Theology and Public Life and assistant provost for the Korean Studies Center at Fuller Theological Seminary.

== Education and academic career ==
Kim earned his bachelor of electronic communication engineering at Hanyang University in 1980 and his master of divinity at Presbyterian University and Theological Seminary, Seoul, South Korea in 1991. After obtaining a master of theology at Fuller Seminary in 1993, he worked as a visiting lecturer at Union Biblical Seminary, Pune, India for four years. In 1997, he started his PhD in theology at Fitzwilliam College, University of Cambridge and graduated in 2001.

After completing his PhD, Kim taught world Christianity at the University of Cambridge and was the director of the Christianity in Asia project. He joined the faculty of York St John University in 2005 and was the Chair in Theology and Public Life in the School of Humanities, Religion and Philosophy for twelve years. In July 2017, he moved to Fuller as Professor of Theology and Public Life and assistant provost for the Korean Studies Center.

Kim was the founding editor of International Journal of Public Theology, a journal he edited from 2007 to 2017. With Katie Day, he co-edited The Companion to Public Theology, which was named one of 2017’s Outstanding Academic Titles by Choice magazine.

== Personal life ==
He is married to Kirsteen Kim, a pneumatologist and professor of theology and world Christianity at Fuller Seminary. Together they have two children.

== Writings ==
- Kim, Sebastian; Day, Katie, eds. (2017). A Companion to Public Theology. Leiden: Brill. ISBN 978-90-04-33606-3.
- Kim, Sebastian; Kim, Kirsteen (2016). Christianity as a World Religion (2nd ed.). London: Bloomsbury. ISBN 9781472569349.
- Kim, Sebastian; Kim, Kirsteen (2014). A History of Korean Christianity. Cambridge: Cambridge University Press. ISBN 9780521196383.
- Kim, Sebastian (2011). Theology in the Public Sphere: Public Theology as a Catalyst for Open Debate. London: SCM Press. ISBN 9780334043775.
- Kim, Sebastian C. H., ed. (2008). Christian Theology in Asia. Cambridge University Press. ISBN 978-1-139-47206-7.
- Kim, Sebastian (2003). In Search of Identity: Debates on Religious Conversion in India. Oxford: Oxford University Press. ISBN 9780195663587.
