= Kirsteen Kim =

British theologian

- Born: 21 September 1959 (age 67); United Kingdom
- Occupation: theologian
- Spouse: Sebastian Kim
- Children: 2

Academic background
- Education: University of Bristol, University of Birmingham

Kirsteen Kim (born 21 September 1959) is a British theologian and Professor of Theology and World Christianity at Fuller Theological Seminary in Pasadena, CA. Her research interests are Korean Christianity, Pneumatology, and world Christianity.

== Education ==
Born in the United Kingdom, Kim obtained a Bachelor of Science at the University of Bristol in 1981. She taught English in Seoul, South Korea and missiology at Union Biblical Seminary, Pune, India, then completed a Master of Art at Fuller Seminary in 1996. She pursued a PhD in Theology at the University of Birmingham between 1997 and 2002, on the topic of "Mission pneumatology, with special reference to the Indian theologies of the Holy Spirit of Stanley Jedidiah Samartha, Vandana and Samuel Rayan." During her PhD studies, she occasionally lectured at the Cambridge Centre for Christianity Worldwide.

After completing her PhD, Kim taught at the Selly Oak Colleges (2001–2006) and the University of Leeds (2006–2008). She held various posts at Leeds Trinity University since 2008, most recently Professor of Theology and World Christianity from 2011 to 2017. Since 2017, she has been Professor of Theology and World Christianity at Fuller Seminary.

She is the senior contributing editor of the journal Mission Studies and one of the editors of the book series Theology and Mission in World Christianity, both published by Brill.

== Personal life ==
She is married to Sebastian Kim, Professor of Theology and Public Life and assistant provost for the Korean Studies Center at Fuller Seminary. They have two children.

== Writings ==
- Kim, Kirsteen (2019). Beyond Missio Dei by Global Conversation: Theology of Mission and Evangelization in the Era of World Christianity. Downers Grove, IL: IVP Academic.
- Kim, Kirsteen; Kim, Sebastian (2016). Christianity as a World Religion. London: Bloomsbury. ISBN 9781472569349.
- Kim, Kirsteen; Kim, Sebastian (2014). A History of Korean Christianity. Cambridge: Cambridge University Press. ISBN 9781139048071.
- Kim, Kirsteen (2012). Joining in with the Spirit: Connecting World Church and Local Mission. London: SCM Press. ISBN 9780334046080.
