= Duncan B. Forrester =

Scottish theologian

- Born: 10 November 1933; Edinburgh, Scotland
- Died: 29 November 2016 (aged 83)
- Known for: founder of the Centre for Theology and Public Issues
- Spouse: Margaret Forrester

Academic work
- Discipline: theology
- Institutions: New College, Edinburgh
- Main interests: Christian ethics; missiology; practical theology; political and public theology

Duncan Baillie Forrester (10 November 1933 – 29 November 2016) was a Scottish theologian and the founder of the Centre for Theology and Public Issues at New College, Edinburgh. He was latterly honorary fellow and professor emeritus at New College.

== Biography ==
Forrester was born in Edinburgh in 1933. He was educated at Madras College secondary school in St Andrews, Fife. He was the son of William and the ecumenicist Isobel Forrester. He married and his wife Margaret Forrester was ordained and became a writer for children.

His writings are contributions to Christian ethics, missiology, practical theology, and political and public theology. During the 1970s his writings focused on Protestant missions in India. After founding the Centre for Theology and Public Issues (CTPI) in 1984, his work increasingly emphasized the intersection between theology and politics, with special reference to Scotland, the United Kingdom, and Europe. He stepped down from the directorship of CTPI in 2000, succeeded by William Storrar. He also published historical studies of Christian worship in Scotland.

He died on 29 November 2016 at the age of 83.

== Publications ==
=== Main publications ===
- 'Indian Christians' Attitudes to Caste in the Nineteenth Century,' in Indian Church History Review 8, no. 2 (1974): 131–147.
- 'Christian Theology in a Hindu Context,' in South Asian Review 8, no. 4 (1975): 343–358.
- 'Indian Christians' Attitudes to Caste in the Twentieth Century,' in Indian Church History Review 9, no. 1 (1975): 3–22.
- Caste and Christianity: Attitudes and Policies on Caste of Anglo-Saxon Protestant Missions in India (London and Atlantic Highlands, NJ: Curzon Press and Humanities Press, 1980).
- Encounter with God, with James I. H. McDonald and Gian Tellini (Edinburgh: T & T Clark, 1983, 1996).
- Christianity and the Future of Welfare (London: Epworth Press, 1985).
- Theology and Politics (Oxford: Basil Blackwell, 1988).
- Worship Now. Book II: A Collection of Services and Prayers for Public Worship, compiled by Forrester et al. (Edinburgh: St Andrew, 1989).
- Beliefs, Values and Policies: Conviction Policies in a Secular Age (Oxford: Clarendon, 1989).
- Theology and Practice (London: Epworth Press, 1990).
- Christianity and Social Vision: Looking to the Future of Scotland, Forrester et al. (Edinburgh: Centre for Theology and Public Issues, 1990).
- True Church and Morality: Reflections on Ecclesiology and Ethics (Geneva: WCC Publications, 1997).
- Christian Justice and Public Policy (Cambridge: Cambridge University Press, 1997).
- Truthful Action: Explorations in Practical Theology (Edinburgh: T & T Clark, 2000).
- On Human Worth: A Christian Vindication of Equality (London, SCM: 2001).
- 'Lesslie Newbigin as Public Theologian,' in A Scandalous Prophet: The Way of Mission after Newbigin, edited by Thomas F. Foust et al. (Grand Rapids, MI: Eerdmans, 2002).
- Theological Fragments: Explorations in Unsystematic Theology (London: T & T Clary, 2005).
- Apocalypse Now? Explorations on Faith in a Time of Terror (Aldershot: Ashgate, 2005).
- Forrester on Christian Ethics and Practical Theology: Collected Writings on Christianity, India, and the Social Order (Farnham, UK and Burlington, VT: Ashgate, 2010).

=== Edited volumes ===
- Studies in the History of Worship in Scotland, edited with Douglas M. Murray (Edinburgh: T & T Clark, 1984, 1996).
- Scottish Churches and the Political Process Today, edited with Alison Elliot (Edinburgh : Centre for Theology and Public Issues, New College, and Unit for the Study of Government in Scotland, Department of Politics, University of Edinburgh, 1986).
- Just Sharing: A Christian Approach to the Distribution of Wealth, Income and Benefits, edited with Danus Skene (London: Epworth Press, 1988).
- Worship and Liturgy in Context: Studies and Case Studies in Theology and Practice, edited with Doug Gay (London: SCM, 2009).

=== About Forrester ===
- Public Theology for the 21st Century: Essays in Honour of Duncan B. Forrester, edited by William F. Storrar and Andrew R. Morton (London: T & T Clark, 2004).
