= Centre for Theology and Public Issues =

Coordinates: 55°56′58″N 3°11′43″W

The Centre for Theology and Public Issues (CTPI) is a research centre based in New College, the School of Divinity at the University of Edinburgh. Founded in 1984 by Duncan B. Forrester, CTPI promotes Christian theological reflection and research on important public issues. CTPI research is global in orientation and rooted in the tradition of public theology. Issues are examined by bringing together theologians, social scientists, church leaders, policy makers, artists, and the public. CTPI has particularly close relations with the Scottish Parliament and other institutions of Scottish public life. The current director is Jolyon Mitchell.

== History ==
CTPI was created to carry on New College's long tradition of public engagement. The founding director of CTPI, Duncan Forrester, reflected in the mid-1990s on the purpose of the centre:

Theology and the problems of the world have tended to drift apart, as theology has sometimes seen the academic world as a refuge from relevance. Nor is it any longer possible to expect a magisterial theology which descends from above to interpret and resolve the world's problems, more or less on its own. We clearly need to develop a theology which is neither deductive nor inductive, but which grows out of a dialectic between the tradition and the praxis of those who are involved in endeavoring to transform the situation.

CTPI was intended to foster such dialectical theological research. Forrester goes on to describe CTPI's working method as a three-step process:

1. Engage the experience of those affected by a public issue. Here an emphasis is placed on hearing the testimonies of the most vulnerable.
2. Gather the best available social scientific analysis of the issue.
3. Reflect theologically on the experiential and social scientific findings. Produce a cogent theological response that empowers Christian advocates and policy makers.

Forrester stepped down from the centre in 2000, handing over his directorship to Will Storrar. Storrar is now the director of the Center of Theological Inquiry, in Princeton. Whilst at Edinburgh, he founded the Global Network for Public Theology, which connects academic research centres in public theology from around the world. Subsequent directors include Cecelia Clegg and Jolyon Mitchell.

Since its founding, CTPI research has resulted in a number of conferences and publications. Topics have included poverty and welfare, justice and the penal system, peace and international security, suicide and public health, finance and ethics, national identity, arts and peacebuilding, and devolution and citizenship.

== Fellowships ==
Since 2020, CTPI has welcomed applications for two new fellowships for scholars whose work relates to public theology:

1. the IASH-CTPI Duncan Forrester Fellowship for emerging scholars
2. the Combe Trust Fellowships for established scholars

=== Combe Trust Fellowships ===
The Combe Trust Fellowship is a two to three month visiting fellowship for researchers in the areas of public theology, religion and religious education, physiology and health, Scots law, peacebuilding, prison reform, psychiatry, psychology and neuroscience, moral philosophy, natural sciences or the arts (e.g. theatre, film, dance, visual arts). The fellowship is intended to encourage outstanding interdisciplinary research, international scholarly collaboration, and networking activities of visiting Fellows together with academics from the centre and from the Institute for Advanced Studies in the Humanities (IASH). The fellowship particularly welcomes applications related to the themes of the Institute Project on Decoloniality (IPD'24) taking place at IASH from 2021 to 2024. This project invites scholars from around the world to visit Edinburgh and conduct research on the theme of decoloniality, broadly understood.

George Combe was a Scottish lawyer and founder of the Edinburgh Phrenological Society.

=== IASH-CTPI Duncan Forrester Fellowship ===
The IASH-CTPI Duncan Forrester Fellowship is a visiting fellowship of up to ten months for emerging scholars working in any of the research areas of the centre, particularly public theology, in relation to areas such as: peacebuilding and the arts; theology, politics, and migration; theology and environmental ethics; and theology, law and justice. Like the Combe Trust Fellowship, the Duncan Forrester Fellowship particularly welcomes applications linked to the themes of the Institute Project on Decoloniality (IPD'24) taking place at IASH from 2021 to 2024.

Duncan B. Forrester was a Scottish theologian and the founder of the centre.

== Recent activities ==
=== The Public and Political Role of TRS Research: Voices from Ukraine, Russia and Georgia ===
On 30 March 2023 at New College, the centre is welcoming a group of international scholars from the 'Political Theologies After Christendom' conference (supported by the CTPI) to Edinburgh to share their reflections on the importance of theology & religious studies in their contexts and in Ukraine, Russia, and Georgia's present political moment. Speakers include Dmitry Biriukov, Kristine Margvelashvili, Valeriy Sesikov, and Tikhon Vasilyev. Respondents are Kateryna Budz and Tiffany Butler.

=== New College Festival of Books and Belief ===
Following the School of Divinity's highly successful literary festival the Winter Tales in 2021, the CTPI sponsored the three-day New College Festival – Books & Belief in November 2022. The festival explored the impact of religion, humanism, and secularism on literature and why prominent thinkers and writers have interacted creatively with these diverse beliefs. Rather than talking about religions more generally, festival speakers explored such themes as personal belief systems and faith, loss of faith, challenges to faith, negotiation of belief systems, generational differences and divisions, and different ways of interconnecting secular and spiritual worlds. Speakers included Peter Mathieson, N. T. Wright, Helen Bond, Joan Taylor, authors Dina Nayeri, Chritra Ramaswamy, poets Kevin MacNeil, Alycia Pirohamed, Alan Spence, and former Archbishop of Canterbury Rowan Williams.

=== Religion in the Public Square: 20 Years Since 9/11 ===
CTPI organized the symposium Religion in the Public Square: 20 Years Since 9/11 at the University of Edinburgh in 2021. Religion is central to the public and political dynamics which emerged in the wake of the 9/11 attacks. Whether it is a rallying cry for unity or a cause for division and conflict, religion remains a controversial topic and is often used to incite violence. The clash between Islam and Christianity and Christianity and Islam is in the forefront of both American and European perceptions of religion, especially in the aftermath of 9/11. This symposium brought together leading experts in theology, philosophy, sociology as well as cultural and political studies to reflect on the enduring legacy and essential lessons to be learnt from 9/11 and what they might reveal about the significance of religion for politics today. Presenters included Farid Hafez, Mona Kanwal Sheikh, Brian Klug, Atalia Omer, Ulrich Schmiedel, and Jayne Svenungsson.

=== Art, Conflict, and Remembering – Rainy Hall Corridor Exhibition ===
In August 2019, CTPI hosted an art exhibition: Art, Conflict and Remembering: The Murals of the Bogside Artists. This powerful and highly topical exhibition told the story of the Troubles through the twelve large scale murals of The People's Gallery in Derry, Northern Ireland]. The Bogside was the epicentre of the Troubles that began with a peaceful civil rights march in 1968 and ended with the Good Friday agreement in 1998. The murals by the Bogside Artists depict seminal events from the 30-year conflict as experienced by the artists and the local community. Unlike most other murals in Northern Ireland, these murals are not party-political or sectarian. As such, they provided talking points for processing the painful past and opportunities for mutually respectful listening as a condition for lasting peace. The exhibition received a very positive reception with over 1500 visitors from around the world.

=== Other recent events ===
CTPI regularly sponsors lecture series, film screenings, and colloquiums on topics of public concern. In response to the decision of the U.S. Supreme Court to remove women's constitutional right to abortion in the United States in 2022, CTPI hosted The Globalization of the Culture Wars? a colloquium of leading scholars who work at the intersection of religion, gender, and politics to analyse and assess the role of public theology in the current gender- and geopolitical moment. In 2020, CTPI organized a panel on 25th anniversary of the Srebrenica genocide – the worst atrocity on European soil since WWII - to remember the atrocities that took place and to consider continuing tensions and prospects for reconciliation. In October 2021, CTPI hosted a film screening of Anote's Ark in collaboration with Take One Action and the Edinburgh Interfaith Association, followed by Q&A with Dr Seforosa Carroll.

== Leadership ==
The current director of CTPI is Professor Jolyon Mitchell. Mitchell's research is in the areas of communications, arts, ethics and religion, with a special interest in violence and peacebuilding. The deputy director is Dr Ulrich Schmiedel and the committee members include Rachel Muers and Drs Caleb Froehlich and Jowita Thor. CTPI's executive committee includes Rev Dr Sandy Forsyth, Dr Suzanna Miller, Jolyon Mitchell, and Dr Ulrich Schmiedel. Advisory board members include Simon Barrow and Douglas Hamilton; Drs Alexander Chow, James Eglinton, Harriet Harris, Lesley Orr, Shadaab Rahemtulla, Joshua Ralston, Emma Wild-Wood, George Wilkes; and Profs Alison Jack, Christine Bell, Suzanne Ewing, Gordon Graham, Oliver O'Donovan, and Steve Yearley.

== Publications ==
=== Books ===
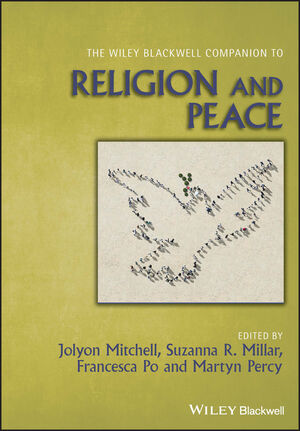
Front cover to the Wiley Blackwell Companion to Religion and Peace

==== The Wiley Blackwell Companion to Religion and Peace ====
In September 2022, the scholarly publisher Wiley Blackwell released The Wiley Blackwell Companion to Religion and Peace. CTPI director Jolyon Mitchell and executive committee member Susana Miller are the volume's editors with Francesca Po and Martyn Percy. This volume brings together a team of renowned scholars to deliver an authoritative and interdisciplinary sourcebook that addresses the key concepts, history, theories, models, resources, and practices in the complex and ambivalent relationship between religion and peace. The editors have included contributions from a wide range of perspectives and locations that reflect diverse methods and approaches.

==== Other recent books ====
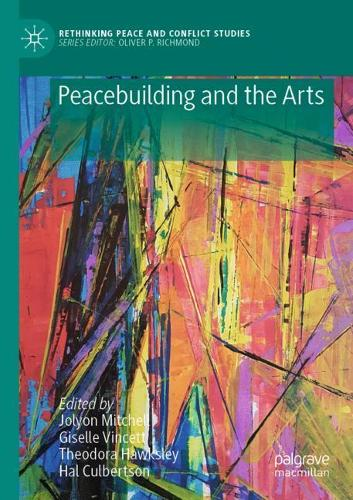
Front cover to Peacebuilding and the Arts

From 2011to 2014, the CTPI and the Kroc Institute for Peace at the University of Notre Dame, now part of the Keough School of Global Affairs, ran a series of interdisciplinary and international workshops as part of the Peacebuilding through Media Arts (PMA) project to foster a critical conversation around the theory and practice of peacebuilding through the arts. Jolyon Mitchell, Giselle Vincett, Theodora Hawksley, and Hal Culbertson edited most of these workshop conversations and other ongoing conversations into the volume Peacebuilding and the Arts (Palgrave MacMillan, 2020). This volume is divided into five sections (on Visual Arts, Music, Literature, Film and Theatre/Dance), with over 20 authors offering overviews of each art form, case studies from around the globe and critical reflections on how the arts can contribute to peacebuilding.

Another book developed through CTPI's Peacebuilding through Media Arts (PMA) project is Theodora Hawksley's Peacebuilding and Catholic Social Teaching (University of Notre Dame Press, 2020). As one of the first scholarly monographs dedicated exclusively to theology, ethics, and peacebuilding, this book endeavors to make Catholicism's robust tradition of social teaching on peace better known and understood, and to encourage its continued development in light of the lived experience of Catholics engaged in peacebuilding and conflict transformation worldwide.

==== Full book list ====
The following is a complete list of books published by CTPI:

- Christianity and the Future of Welfare, Duncan B. Forrester, Epworth, 1985. ISBN 0-7162-0409-6
- The Scottish Churches and the Political Process Today, Alison Elliot and Duncan B. Forrester (eds.), 1987. (Google Books)
- Discerning Images: The Media and Theological Education, Derek Weber, 1991. (Google Books)
- The End of Punishment: Christian Perspectives on the Crisis in Criminal Justice, Chris Wood, 1991. ISBN 978-0-86153-145-5
- Opportunities and Limitations in Religious Broadcasting, Peter Elvy, 1991. (Google Books)
- Capital: A Moral Instrument? Members of Working Group on Finance and Ethics, 1992. ISBN 0-86153-149-3
- Voices in the Andes: The Churches Use of Radio in Ecuador, Alice May Mitchell, 1993. (Google Books)
- Beyond Fear: Vision, Hope & Generosity, Andrew R. Morton (ed.), Saint Andrew Press, 1998. ISBN 978-0-7152-0759-8
- God in Society: Doing Social Theology in Scotland Today, William Storrar and Peter Donald (eds.), Saint Andrew Press, 2003. ISBN 978-0-7152-0803-8
- Public Theology for the 21st Century: Essays in Honour of Duncan Forrester, William Storrar and Andrew R. Morton, (eds.), T&T Clark International, 2004. ISBN 978-0-567-08892-5
- Honouring Children: The Human Rights of the Child, Kathleen Marshall and Paul Parvis, Saint Andrew Press, 2004. ISBN 0-7152-0810-1
- Netting Citizens: Exploring Citizenship in the Internet Age, Johnston R. McKay (ed.), Saint Andrew Press, 2004. ISBN 978-0-7152-0821-2
- Christian Faith and the Welfare of the City: Essays for Alison Elliot, 2008. (Google Books) ISBN 978-1-870126-46-5
- Growing Citizens: An Interdisciplinary Reflection on Citizen Education, Alison Elliot and Heidi Poon (eds.), Saint Andrews Press, 2009. ISBN 978-0-7152-0872-4

=== Discussion papers ===
CTPI has published a number of discussion papers by leading scholars. The papers were made available by CTPI at a small price, between £0.50 and £2.00.

- The Virtues of the Progressive Educator, Paulo Freire, 1988. (Google Books)
- The Radical Anglo-Catholic Social Vision, Kenneth Leech, 1989. (Google Books)
- Encountering Illness, Michael Ignatieff, 1989. (Google Books)
- A Rationale for Religious Communication, Chris Arthur, 1988. (Google Books)
- The Good Society Today, David Jenkins, 1994. (Google Books)
- Cool Dads: What Do Children Need?, Cynthia Milligan and Alan Dowie, 2000. (Google Books)
- An Apt and Cheerful Conversation on Marriage, John Witte, 2000. (Google Books)
- Building a Citizens Welfare State, Ruth Lister, 2001. (Google Books)
- Out of the Shadows: Christianity and Violence against Women in Scotland, Lesley Orr Macdonald, 2001. (Google Books)
- The End of Equality? A Strange Silence in Public Debate, Duncan B. Forrester, with responses from Christopher Rowland, Rev. Kathy Galloway and Church Action on Poverty, 2002. (Google Books)

=== Occasional papers ===
Between 1984 and 2003, CTPI published nearly fifty occasional papers. These were substantive collections of scholarly essays on a variety of topics, many of which are available in their entirety online:

1. Does He Know How Frightening He is in His Strangeness?' A Study of Attitudes towards Dementing People, Hugh M. D. Petszch, 1984. (Google Books)
2. Family, School and Church in Religious Education, Leslie J. Francis et al., 1984. (Google Books)
3. Welfare State or Welfare Society?, Robin Downie et al., 1985. (Google Books)
4. From Captivity to Liberation: Some Theological and Pastoral Perspectives on Chronic Renal Failure, Gillian M Morton, 1985. (Google Books)
5. The New Right and Christian Values, Lord Harris et al., 1985. (Google Books)
6. The End of Professionalism?, William F. May et al., 1985. (Google Books)
7. Poverty Today, Peter Townsend et al., 1986. (Google Books)
8. Faith in the Scottish City, Richard O'Brien et al., 1986. (Google Books)
9. Education and Community, Ruth Jonathan et al., 1986. (Google Books)
10. Law and Order: Prospects for the Future, Malcolm Rifkind et al., 1986. (Google Books) ISBN 978-1-870126-01-4
11. Finance and Ethics, Ronald Preston et al., 1987. (Google Books) ISBN 978-1-870126-02-1
12. The Scottish Churches and the Political Process Today, eds., Alison Elliot and Duncan B. Forrester, 1986. (Google Books) ISBN 978-1-870126-00-7
13. Northern Ireland: A Challenge to Theology, Enda McDonagh et al., 1987. (Google Books) ISBN 978-1-870126-03-8
14. Inequalities in Health in the 1980s, ed., Alison Elliot, 1988. (Google Books) ISBN 978-1-870126-04-5
15. Distribution of Wealth and Income: Patterns and Trends, Fred Twine, 1988. (Google Books) ISBN 978-1-870126-05-2
16. The Economics of the Distribution of Income and Wealth, John Sleeman, 1988. (Google Books) ISBN 978-1-870126-06-9
17. Dependency: Dependence, Independence, Inter-dependence in Culture and Society, ed., Chris Clark, 1988. (Google Books)
18. The Renewal of Social Vision, eds, Alison J. Elliot and Ian Swanson, 1989. (Google Books) ISBN 978-1-870126-07-6
19. Justice, Guilt and Forgiveness in the Penal System, ed., David Garland, 1990. (Google Books) ISBN 978-1-870126-08-3
20. The Market and Health Care, David Jenkins et al., 1990. (Google Books) ISBN 978-1-870126-09-0
21. Christianity and Social Vision: Looking to the Future of Scotland, Duncan Forrester et al., 1990. (Google Books) ISBN 978-1-870126-10-6
22. Justice and the Market, Gordon A. Hughes et al., 1990. (Google Books) ISBN 978-1-870126-11-3
23. Third World Debt – First World Responsibility, David Knox et al., 1991. (Google Books) ISBN 978-1-870126-12-0
24. Vision and Prophecy: The Tasks of Social Theology Today, ed., Michael S. Northcott, 1991. (Google Books) ISBN 978-1-870126-14-4
25. The Future of Broadcasting in Britain, Brian Marjoribanks et al., 1991. (Google Books) ISBN 978-1-870126-13-7
26. Peacemaking and Security in the 1990s, Hugh Beach et al., 1991. (Google Books) ISBN 978-1-870126-16-8
27. The Animal Kingdom and the Kingdom of God, Ruth Page et al., 1991. (Google Books) ISBN 978-1-870126-17-5
28. Penal Policy: The Way Forward, Rod Morgan et al., 1991. (Google Books) ISBN 978-1-870126-19-9
29. Seeing Scotland, Seeing Christ, David McCrone et al., 1993. (Google Books) ISBN 978-1-870126-24-3
30. AIDS, Sex and the Scottish Churches, ed., Michael S. Northcott, 1993. (Google Books)
31. Care, Community and State, ed., Sandy Wynd, 1994. (Google Books) ISBN 978-1-870126-26-7
32. God's Will in a Time of Crisis: A Colloquium Celebrating the 50th Anniversary of the Baillie Commission, ed., Andrew R. Morton, 1994. (Google Books) ISBN 978-1-870126-27-4
33. After Socialism? The Future of Radical Christianity, ed., Andrew R Morton, 1994. (Google Books) ISBN 978-1-870126-28-1
34. Christian Responsibility and the New Europe, ed., Andrew R Morton, 1994. (Google Books) ISBN 978-1-870126-29-8
35. Justice and Prosperity: A Realistic Vision? A Response to the Report of the Commission on Social Justice, ed., Andrew R Morton, 1995. (Google Books) ISBN 978-1-870126-30-4
36. Domestic Debt: Disease of Consumer Society?, ed., Andrew R Morton, 1996. (Google Books) ISBN 978-1-870126-31-1
37. Security, Solidarity and Peacemaking, ed., Andrew R. Morton, 1996. (Google Books ISBN 978-1-870126-32-8
38. Work, Worth and Community: Responding to the Crisis of Work, eds, John Hughes and Andrew Morton, 1996. (Google Books) ISBN 978-1-870126-33-5
39. The State of Imprisonment, ed., Andrew R Morton, 1997. (Google Books) ISBN 978-1-870126-34-2
40. Catholicism and the Future of Scotland, eds, Gerard Hand and Andrew Morton, 1997. (Google Books) ISBN 978-1-870126-35-9
41. When Maize and Tobacco Are Not Enough: A Church Study of Malawi's Agro-Economy, ed., Peggy Owens, 1997. (Google Books) ISBN 978-1-870126-36-6
42. The Future of Welfare, ed., Andrew R. Morton, 1997. (Google Books) ISBN 978-1-870126-37-3
43. What do children need from their fathers? , Cynthia Milligan and Alan Dowie, 1998. (Google Books) ISBN 978-1-870126-38-0
44. A Turning Point in Ireland and Scotland? A Challenge to the Churches and Theology Today, ed., Andrew Morton, 1998. (Google Books) ISBN 978-1-870126-39-7
45. A Europe of Neighbours? Religious Social Thought and the Reshaping of a Pluralist Europe, eds, Andrew Morton and Jim Francis, 1999. (Google Books) ISBN 978-1-870126-40-3
46. The Sorrows of Young Men: Exploring their Increasing Risk of Suicide, eds, Andrew Morton and Jim Francis, 2000. (Google Books) ISBN 978-1-870126-43-4
47. Couples in Transition: Integrity and Brokenness, ed., Andrew R. Morton, 2000. (Google Books) ISBN 978-1-870126-44-1
48. High Ideals & Sobering Realities: Public Lectures on Public Issues, Jim Wallace et al., 2003. (Google Books) ISBN 978-1-870126-45-8
