= Regent Terrace =

Street in Edinburgh, Scotland

Coordinates: 55°57′17″N 3°10′38″W

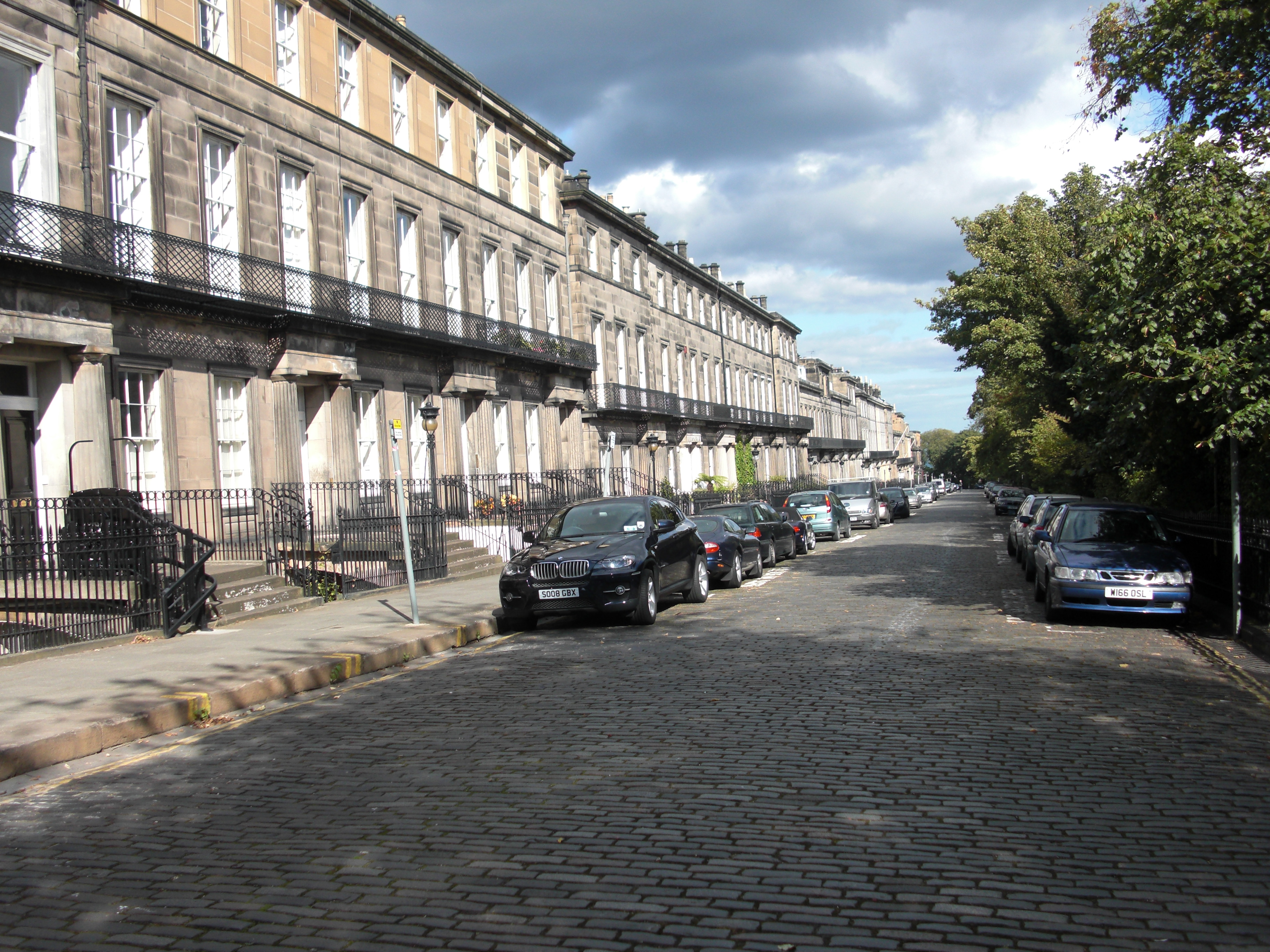
Regent Terrace

Regent Terrace is a residential street of 34 classical 3-bay townhouses built on the upper south side of Calton Hill in the city of Edinburgh, Scotland. Regent Terrace is within the Edinburgh New and Old Town UNESCO World Heritage Site inscribed in 1995.

== Houses ==
The name Regent Terrace was chosen because of the visit to Edinburgh in 1822 of George IV who had been Prince Regent until 1820 during the illness of his father George III. The terrace was designed by the architect William Henry Playfair in 1825 and built between 1826 and 1833. Playfair designed Regent, Royal, and Carlton Terrace at the same time as part of an Eastern extension to the New Town that was planned to be even more magnificent than Craig's original New Town. Playfair hoped to attract the "fashionable and wealthy people" to Regent Terrace. The houses are all category A listed buildings.

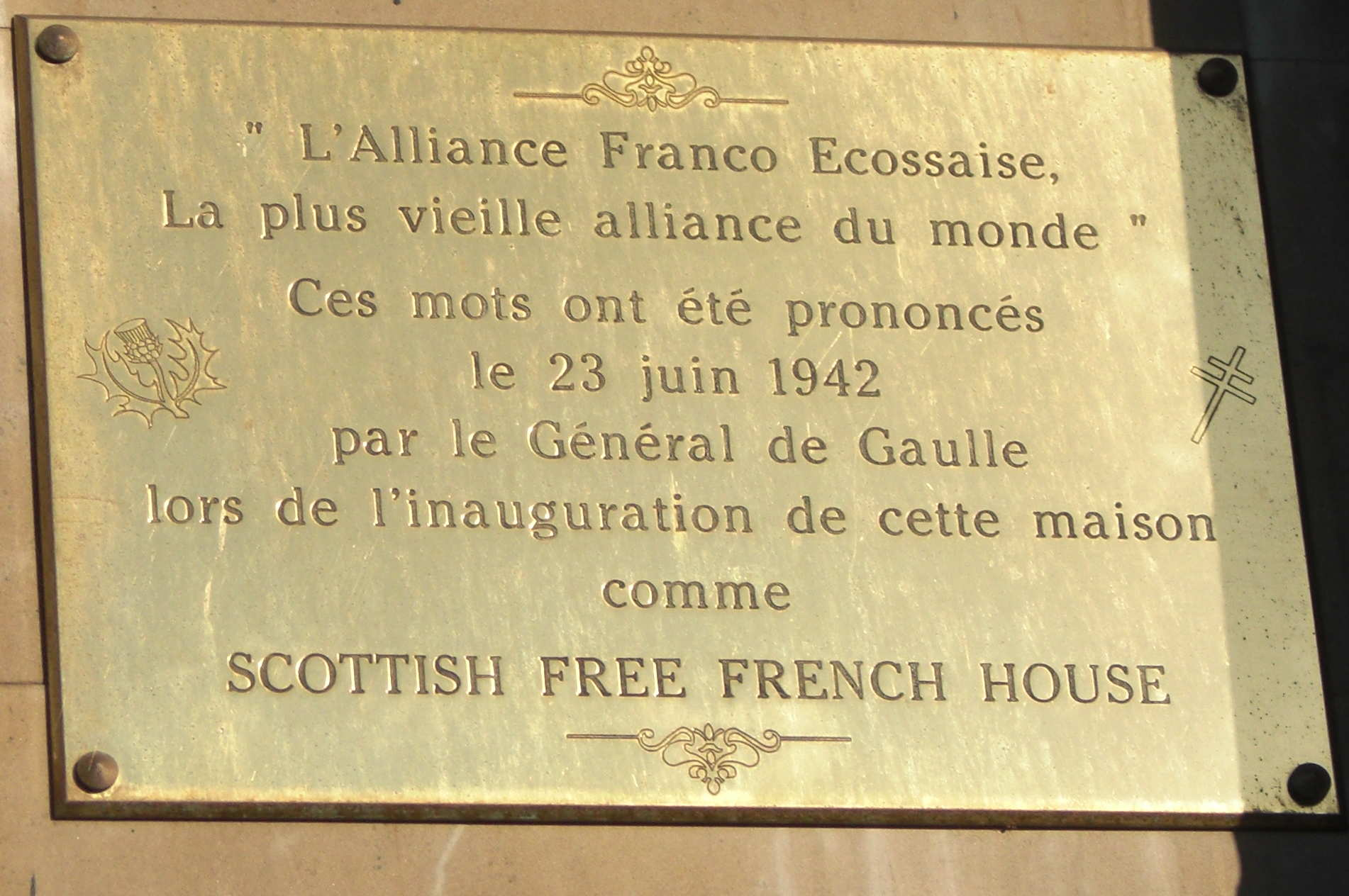
Plaque on the wall outside number 28 Regent Terrace

The houses were built as a terrace on the north side of the street, stepped down at intervals following the slope of the road. Originally, eighteen houses were of two stories and basement (although many have added a full third storey or attic) while the remaining sixteen houses were three stories and basement. The front elevation features continuous cast-iron trellis balconies while each house has a porch with fluted attached Greek Doric columns. Thirteen of the houses retain the original three-ringed transom windows above the main doors. The terrace faces Holyrood Park, Arthur's Seat, Holyrood Palace, the Old Town and the Scottish Parliament building. The houses in the terrace are a mixture of tenures — most are privately owned and occupied but some are rented as holiday accommodation. Some of the houses in the terrace have been split into flats.

Number 3 Regent Terrace has been the United States Consulate since 1951. Number 28 was originally the Free French House and was opened by General de Gaulle in 1942. Later it became the French Consulate and then the home of the French consul-general. Number 32 was the home of the Norwegian consul-general until 2008. The western end of Regent Terrace was closed to traffic in 2001 because of security concerns about the United States Consulate.

== House prices ==
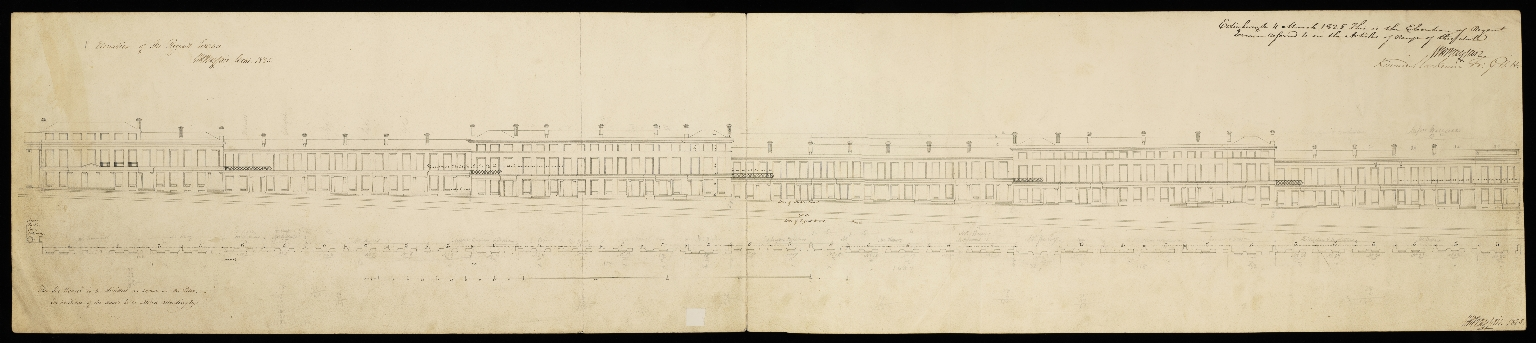
Regent Terrace drawing by William Playfair drawn in 1825 held by University of Edinburgh Heritage Collections

Number 6 Regent Terrace was sold for £1,500 in 1831 and £2,700 in 1877. Prices then dropped as low as £1,000 before World War II and rose to £2,000 at the end of the war, £4,000 by the mid-1950s and £400,000 in 1993. In 2021 the average house price on the Terrace was estimated at £1.68 million, the highest in Scotland.

== People ==
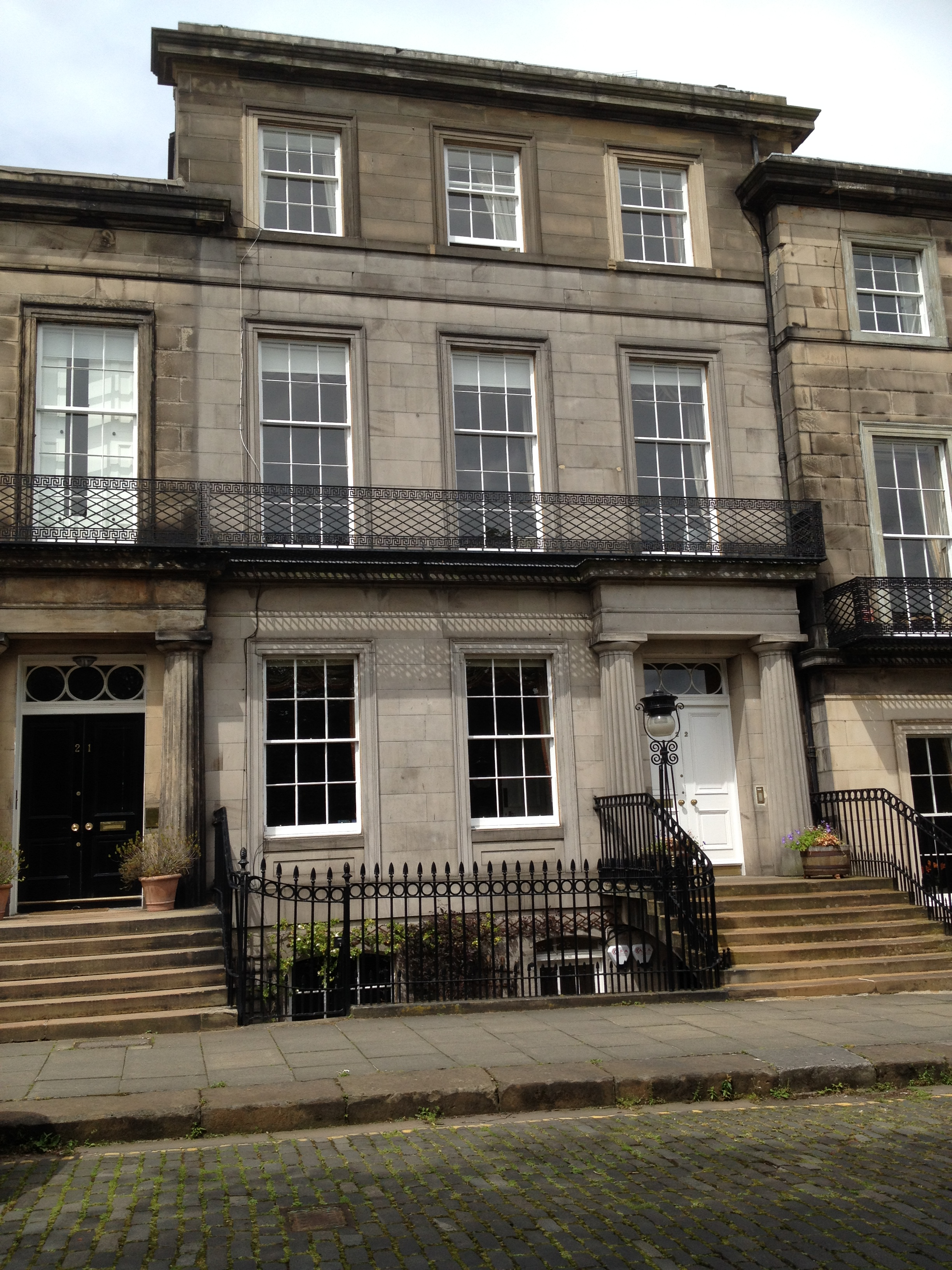
22 Regent Terrace, residence of the French royal family in exile (1830–1833)

The first resident was Isaac Bayley, a solicitor in the Supreme Courts of Scotland, who occupied number 13 Regent Terrace in 1826. Bayely's father-in-law Dr. George Husband Baird, principal of Edinburgh University, also lived there towards the end of his life. Louis Antoine, Duke of Angoulême (the elder son of Charles X of France, last king of the House of Bourbon and hence the last Dauphin of France) and his wife Madame Royale, (the daughter of Louis XVI and Marie Antoinette), moved into what is now 22 (then 21) Regent Terrace in 1830. The widowed duchesse de Berry, sister in law of the Duke of Angoulême, also lived at what is now 12 (then 11) Regent Terrace at that time. Her young son, Henri, Count of Chambord grandson of Charles X and next in line after the Duke of Angoulême, is said to have wept bitterly when his family left for Austria in 1832 as he had become very attached to Scotland.

The painter Sir George Harvey lived at 21 Regent Terrace from 1854 to 1876. Sir George was one of the founders of the Royal Scottish Academy, was elected president in 1864 and was knighted in 1867. The influential Scottish minister and author the Reverend Dr. Maxwell Nicholson lived at 3 Regent Terrace for most of his later life until 1874. The architect Duncan Menzies lived at 31 Regent Terrace from about 1891–1910.Sir James Puckering Gibson 1st Baronet of Regent Terrace was Lord Provost of Edinburgh from 1906 to 1909 and represented Edinburgh East in the House of Commons as a Liberal between 1909 and 1912. He lived at 33 Regent Terrace from 1880 and was created in the Baronetage of the United Kingdom on 23 November 1909. Sir James had no children so when he died in 1812 his title became extinct. Professor Sir Thomas Hudson Beare was Professor of Engineering Heriot-Watt University, Edinburgh, and University College, London. He was also Regius Professor of Engineering in Edinburgh University and lived at 10 Regent Terrace from 1901. The architect William Gordon Dey was born at 9 Regent Terrace in 1911 and went to the Royal High School which was close by. A Regius Professor of English at Edinburgh University Sir H. J. C. Grierson lived at 12 Regent Terrace from 1913 to 1933. His daughter Janet (married name Janet Teissier du Cros) was an author who later wrote Divided Loyalties about her years as a Scottish woman in the Cevennes in occupied France during the war when the French resistance was active. The painter Francis Cadell, one of the Scottish Colourists, lived in 30 Regent Terrace from 1930 to 1935. Lady Margaret Sackville, daughter of Reginald Windsor Sackville, 7th Earl De La Warr, and second cousin of Vita Sackville-West lived at 30 Regent Terrace from 1930 to 1932. Sir George Dick-Lauder, 10th Baronet, an Indian Civil Service Administrator, lived at 16 Regent Terrace and died there in 1936. Queen Mary used to visit Sir Hew Hamilton Dalrymple KCVO at Number 24. Sir Hew, brother of the Earl of Stair, Member of Parliament for Wigtownshire and Captain of the Royal Company of Archers, the King's Bodyguard for Scotland, lived there until he died in 1945. John Murray, 9th Earl of Dunmore lived at 14 Regent Terrace until his death in 1980. In 1993 Peter Fraser, Baron Fraser of Carmyllie, then Minister of State at the Scottish Office, was living in Regent Terrace.

The author and mathematician Ann Katharine Mitchell, who worked at Bletchley Park during World War II on the German Enigma cypher machines, lived for forty years at number 20 Regent Terrace. Sir Peter Maxwell Davies, composer, conductor and Master of the Queen's Music, lived at 13 Regent Terrace until 2000. The actor Sean Connery and the Argentinian footballer Claudio Caniggia reportedly bid for 17 Regent Terrace in 2001 but neither succeeded in buying it The diplomat Sir James Marjoribanks lived at 13 Regent Terrace, from 1966 until his death in 2003. Sir James was British Ambassador to the European Economic Community, presented Britain's application to join the European Community in 1967 and was instrumental in this application becoming successful. Sir Robert Russell Hillhouse, KCB, Permanent Under-Secretary of State, Scottish Office (head of the Scottish Civil Service), was living at 19 Regent Terrace in 2003.

=== Listed by address ===
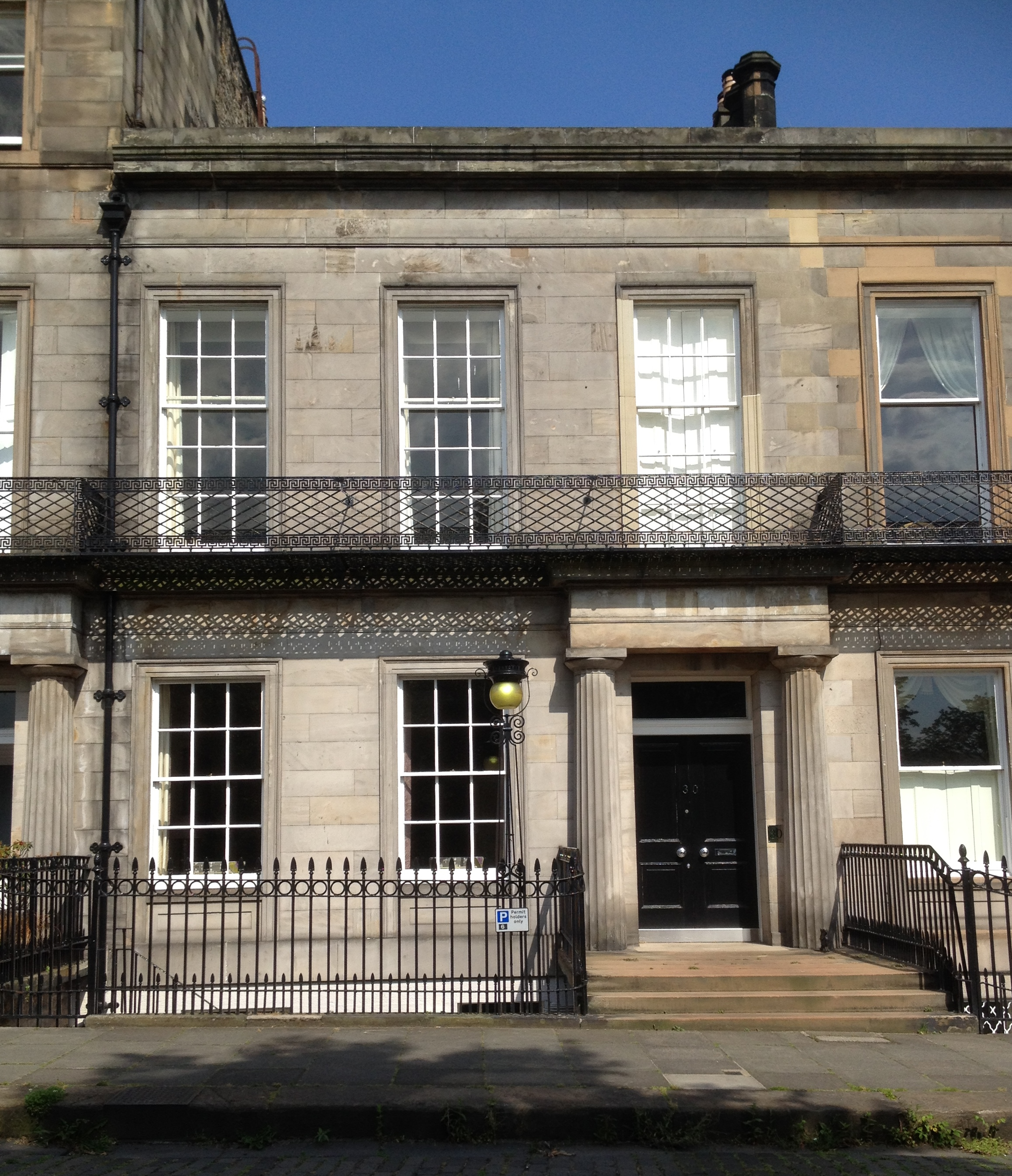
30 Regent Terrace, home of Francis Cadell, Scottish Colourist painter

- 3 – Rev Dr. Maxwell Nicholson (−1874)
- 5 – Robert Gibb and William Gibb artist brothers
- 9 – William Gordon Dey (1911–) FRIBA, architect and his father Alexander John Dey FRSE
- 10 – Alexander Adie (1852–1858), David Masson (1869–1882) and Professor Sir Thomas Hudson Beare (1904–1940)
- 11 – Thomas Jamieson Boyd of Oliver and Boyd, Lord Provost of Edinburgh
- 12 – Princess Caroline of Naples (1826–1832), Professor Sir H. J. C. Grierson (1913–1953) and his daughter the author Janet Teissier du Cros
- 13 – Sir Isaac Bayley SSC (1826–), George Husband Baird (1827–40), Rev Peter Hay Hunter 1896 -1900, Peter Maxwell-Davies (−2000), Sir James Marjoribanks (1966–2002)
- 14 – John Murray, 9th Earl of Dunmore (−1980)
- 16 – Sir George Dick-Lauder, 10th Baronet (−1936)
- 17 – Ronnie Selby Wright (1946–1995)
- 19 – Sir Robert Russell Hillhouse, Permanent Under-Secretary of State (2003)
- 20 – Ann Katharine Mitchell (1922–2020)
- 21 – Sir George Harvey (1854–1876), George Waterston (1959–1980)
- 22 – The French royal family (in exile) including Marie Therese of France (1830–1833), eldest child of Louis XVI and Marie Antoinette
- 24 – Sir Hew Hamilton Dalrymple (−1945)
- 25 Alan Stevenson, lighthouse engineer
- 26 – Lt Col Edward Madden FRSE botanist in the 1850s
- 28 – William Erskine (1773–1852) historian
- 28 – Very Rev Paton James Gloag, Moderator of the General Assembly of the Church of Scotland in 1889
- 30 – Lady Margaret Sackville (1930–1932), Francis Cadell (1930–1935)
- 31 – Dr John Fraser Commissioner of Lunacy for Scotland and later Duncan Menzies (c 1891–1910) architect
- 33 – Sir James Gibson, 1st Baronet of Regent Terrace (1880–1912)

== See also ==
- Carlton Terrace, Edinburgh
- Regent, Royal and Carlton Terrace Gardens
- Calton Hill
- Royal Terrace, Edinburgh
- William Henry Playfair

== Bibliography ==
- Mitchell, Anne (1993), The People of Calton Hill, Mercat Press, ISBN 1-873644-18-3
