= Portrait of a University =

History book by H. B. Charlton

Portrait of a University 1851–1951
- Title page for Portrait of a University 1851–1951 (1951)
- Author: H. B. Charlton
- Language: English
- Publisher: Manchester University Press
- Publication date: 1951
- Publication place: United Kingdom

Portrait of a University 1851–1951; to commemorate the centenary of Manchester University is a book written by H. B. Charlton to celebrate the 100 year anniversary of the founding of Owens College, and published by Manchester University Press. At the time of writing Henry Buckley Charlton (born 1890) had been John Edward Taylor Professor of English Literature since 1921. It includes a chapter by Samuel Alexander and an essay by Edward Fiddes on the admission of women to full university status.
