= Duncan Menzies =

Duncan Menzies may refer to:

- Duncan Menzies, Lord Menzies (born 1953), judge of the Supreme Courts of Scotland.
- Duncan Menzies (architect) (1837–1910), Scottish architect and civil engineer
- Duncan Menzies (curler) (born 1994), Scottish curler
