= On Philosophical Style =

1954 book by Brand Blanshard

- Author: Brand Blanshard
- Language: English
- Genre: Non-fiction
- Publisher: Manchester University Press
- Publication date: 1954
- Publication place: United Kingdom

On Philosophical Style is a short book by the American philosopher Brand Blanshard. It originated in 1953 as the Adamson Lecture, given at the University of Manchester, and was subsequently published in 1954 by Manchester University Press. (Note: The Manchester edition appeared simultaneously with publication by Indiana University Press.) His most-praised book, its thesis is that obscurity of style in philosophical writing is antithetical to the chief aim of philosophy: the elucidation and clarification of our most foundational and important concepts. Nevertheless, as several examples make only too apparent, a number of great philosophers were not notably great writers. Blanshard analyzes their most common shortcomings, and offers suggestions as to how these might be remedied.

Though On Philosophical Style can stand entirely on its own, it is perhaps best understood as part of Blanshard's greater metaphilosophical project which became clearer in 1962 with the publication of Reason and Analysis. In that book Blanshard critiqued contemporary trends in philosophy, and went on to offer his own views on the nature and scope of philosophy.

== Reviews ==
- Knox, T. M. (1955). "Review of On Philosophical Style, by Brand Blanshard". The Philosophical Quarterly. 5 (19). Oxford University Press: 189–190. doi:10.2307/2217157. ISSN 1467-9213. JSTOR 2217157.
- Threthowan, Dom Illytd (1955). "Review of On Philosophical Style, by Brand Blanshard". The Downside Review. 73 (233). SAGE: 294. doi:10.1177/001258065507323316. ISSN 0012-5806. S2CID 171774702 – via DeepDyve.
