= Saint-Hippolyte-du-Fort =

Saint-Hippolyte-du-Fort Sent Ipolit (Occitan)
- Commune
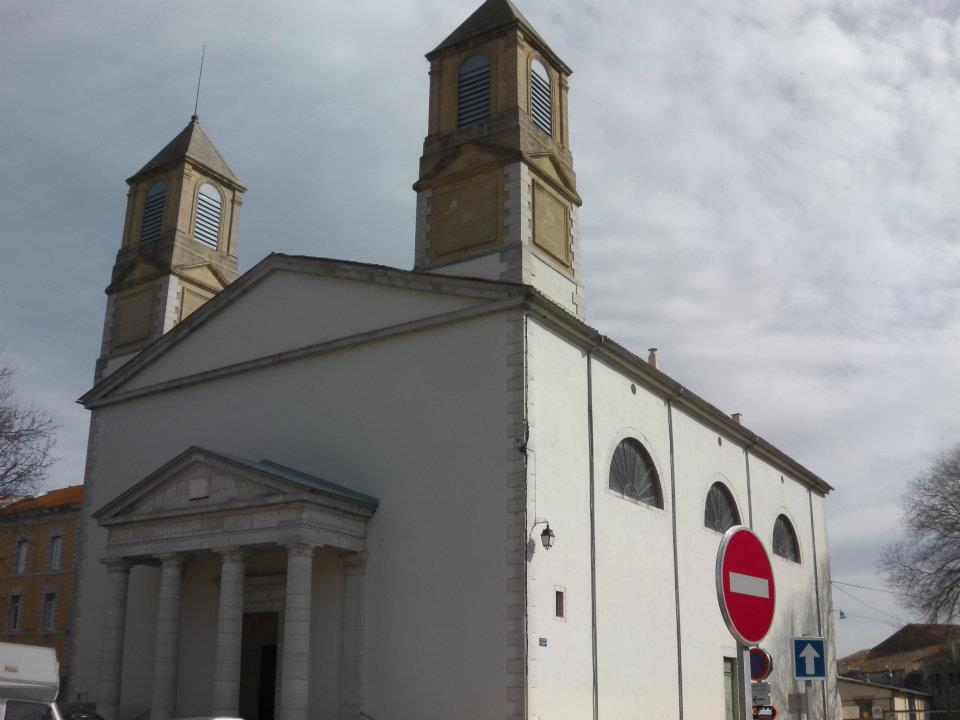
- The temple in Saint-Hippolyte-du-Fort

- Coat of arms
- Location of Saint-Hippolyte-du-Fort
- Location within France Location within Occitanie
- Coordinates: 43°58′00″N 3°51′24″E
- Country: France
- Region: Occitania
- Department: Gard
- Arrondissement: Le Vigan
- Canton: Le Vigan

Government
  - Mayor (2020–2026): Bruno Olivieri
- Area^{1}: 29.38 km^{2} (11.34 sq mi)
- Elevation: 170 m (560 ft)
- Highest elevation: 547 m (1,795 ft)
- Lowest elevation: 135 m (443 ft)
- Population (2023): 3,737
  - Density: 127.2/km^{2} (329.4/sq mi)
- Time zone: UTC+01:00 (CET)
  - Summer (DST): UTC+02:00 (CEST)
- INSEE/Postal code: 30263 /30170
- ^{1} French Land Register data, which excludes lakes, ponds, glaciers > 1 km^{2} (0.386 sq mi or 247 acres) and river estuaries.

Saint-Hippolyte-du-Fort (French: [sɛ̃t‿ipɔlit dy fɔʁ]; Occitan: Sent Ipolit; lit. 'Saint Hippolytus [of the Fort]') is a commune in the Gard department, Occitania, southern France. The town has a silk museum and barracks.

== Population ==
Historical population
Year	Pop.	±% p.a.
1968	3,547	—
1975	3,461	−0.35%
1982	3,400	−0.25%
1990	3,515	+0.42%
1999	3,391	−0.40%
2007	3,732	+1.20%
2012	3,857	+0.66%
2017	3,939	+0.42%
2023	3,737	−0.87%
Source: INSEE

== In literature ==
A book titled Divided Loyalties described life in the commune and the area during the Second World War as experienced by Janet Teissier du Cros and family.

== Notable people ==
- Pierre Billon (1901–1981), French film director and screenwriter
- Hinaupoko Deveze (born 2002), Miss France 2026
- Félix Bonfils (1831-1885), photographer

== See also ==
- Communes of the Gard department
