= Janet Teissier du Cros =

Scottish writer, broadcaster and pianist (1905 - 1990)

Janet Teissier du Cros

Janet Teissier du Cros (born Janet Sinclair Craigie Grierson; 26 January 1905 – 14 October 1990) was a writer, translator, broadcaster and pianist who was brought up in Scotland and then lived in France for sixty years. She wrote about her life in wartime France in Divided Loyalties:a Scotswoman in Occupied France.

== Personal life ==
Born Janet Sinclair Craigie Grierson on 26 January 1905 in Aberdeen, her parents were Mary and Herbert Grierson, scholar and academic. Janet was the youngest of five girls who grew up in a prosperous, literary household: living in Aberdeen until 1916 and then at 12 Regent Terrace, Edinburgh.

Her father wanted his daughters to be fluent in French and employed Swiss governesses for them. Her later education was at St George's School in Edinburgh. There she met the writer Janet Adam Smith who was a lifelong friend.

Her musical talent took her to study in Vienna. Back in Edinburgh, she met François Teissier du Cros, an engineer and physicist who had been educated at prestigious École polytechnique, and married him at the end of year 1930. They went to live near his family in the Cevennes, southern France, and this is where her wartime memoirs are set. In 1944, she hitch-hiked north on a US army vehicle to find her husband.

== Family ==
Janet and François Teissier du Cros and their four children lived in Paris for many years after the war, but moved back to the Teissier du Cros home at Mandiargues near Saint-Hippolyte-du-Fort in 1972. French economist André Teissier du Cros is one of her children, who had been married for twenty three years to the French actress and astrologer Élizabeth Teissier. Two of her sisters were writers: Molly Dickins, author of A Wealth of Relations, and Flora Grierson, who co-founded the Samson Press.

== Writing ==
Teissier du Cros’ book Divided Loyalties (1962) tells the story of her experiences as a British woman in occupied France, in the Cevennes where the Resistance was active. Her husband was away much of the time, initially with the army, and she was often uncertain about where he was and what he was doing. She lived in a small rural cottage with her young children, and struggled to get enough food for the family, while estranged from her in-laws because of disagreements about their support for Marshal Pétain. Reviewers praised the book for the quality of the writing as well as the compelling personal story of a strong woman dealing with an extraordinary situation. A few years later she was invited to write features about France for the Glasgow Herald.

In 1992, after her death, there was another edition of Divided Loyalties, with a foreword by Richard Cobb who said the author succeeded in relating "dramatic public events" to "everyday existence". Janet Adam Smith contributed an afterword which updated readers on the lives of people in the book. In 2014 a society, Les Amis de Janet (Friends of Janet), was formed in Saint-Hippolyte-du-Fort to promote her work. A memoir of Teissier du Cros’ early life in Aberdeen and Edinburgh, Cross currents: a childhood in Scotland, was published in 1997.

Teissier du Cros’ translation work included Maouno by Robert Crottet (1941), the story of a friendship between a boy and a reindeer, and commissions for the journal, Revue France-Asie.

== Broadcasting ==
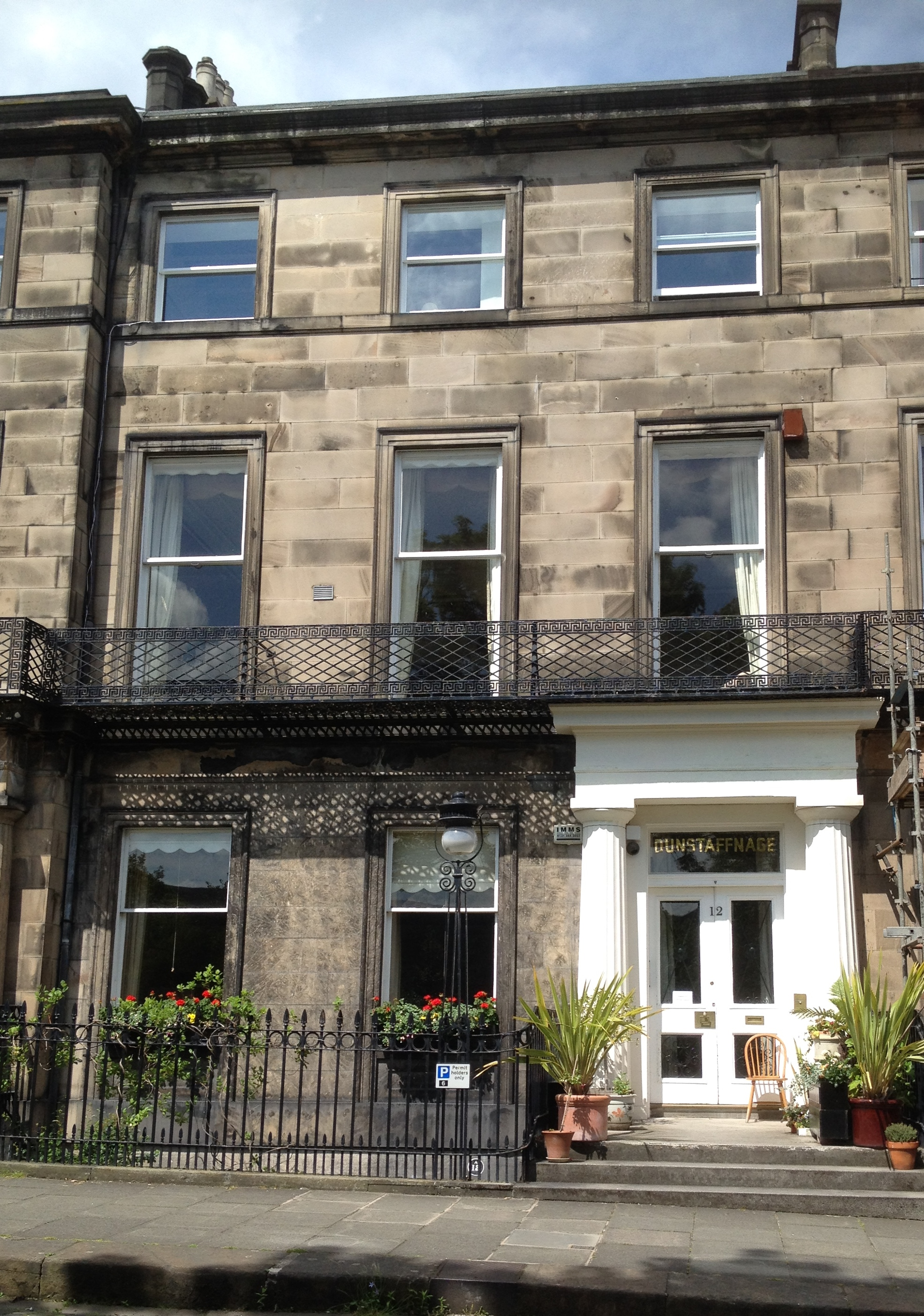
Her family home from about age 10, at 12 Regent Terrace, Edinburgh

In the 1950s she broadcast on BBC radio, notably in a regular slot on Woman's Hour where she contributed “lively vignettes of life in Paris and the Cevennes”.

== Music ==
Her talent for the piano was noted by the pianist-composer and family friend Donald Tovey who took her on as a pupil. With his encouragement, Teissier du Cros went to study music in Vienna in 1923. After marrying in 1930 and moving to France she performed very little in public, though she did play at the Usher Hall in Edinburgh in 1933. Music was always part of her life. She played chamber music with friends, and played the piano regularly until the last few weeks of her life.
