= H. J. C. Grierson =

British editor and critic (1866–1960)

Sir H. J. C. Grierson FBA
- Portrait by Walter Stoneman, 1924
- Born: Herbert John Clifford Grierson; 16 January 1866; Lerwick, Shetland, Scotland
- Died: 19 February 1960 (aged 94); Cambridge, Cambridgeshire, England
- Spouse: Mary Letitia Grierson (m. 1896)
- Children: 5

Academic background
- Education: King's College, Aberdeen; Christ Church, Oxford

Sir Herbert John Clifford Grierson, FBA (16 January 1866 – 19 February 1960) was a Scottish literary scholar, editor, and literary critic.

== Life and work ==
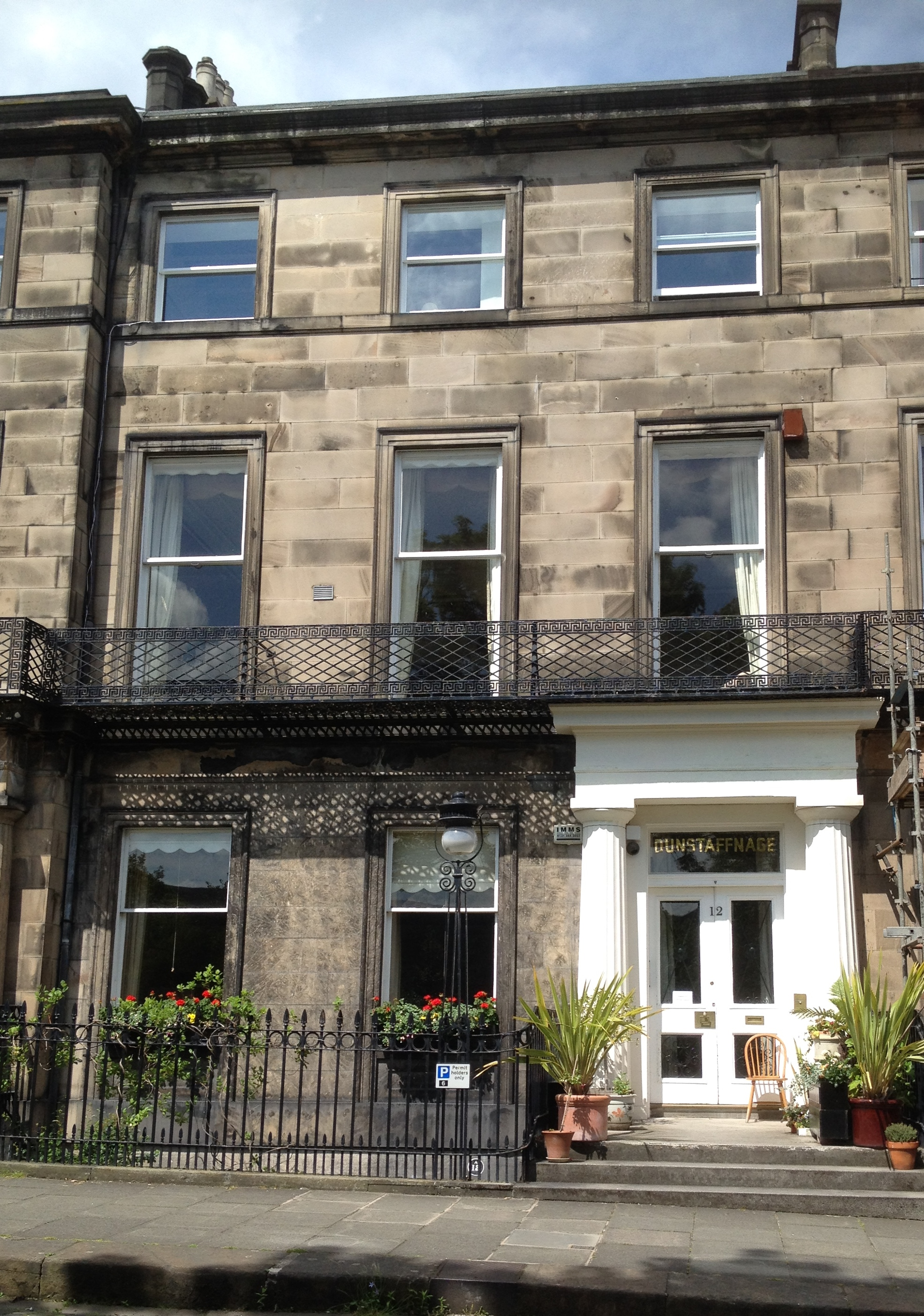
12 Regent Terrace, Edinburgh

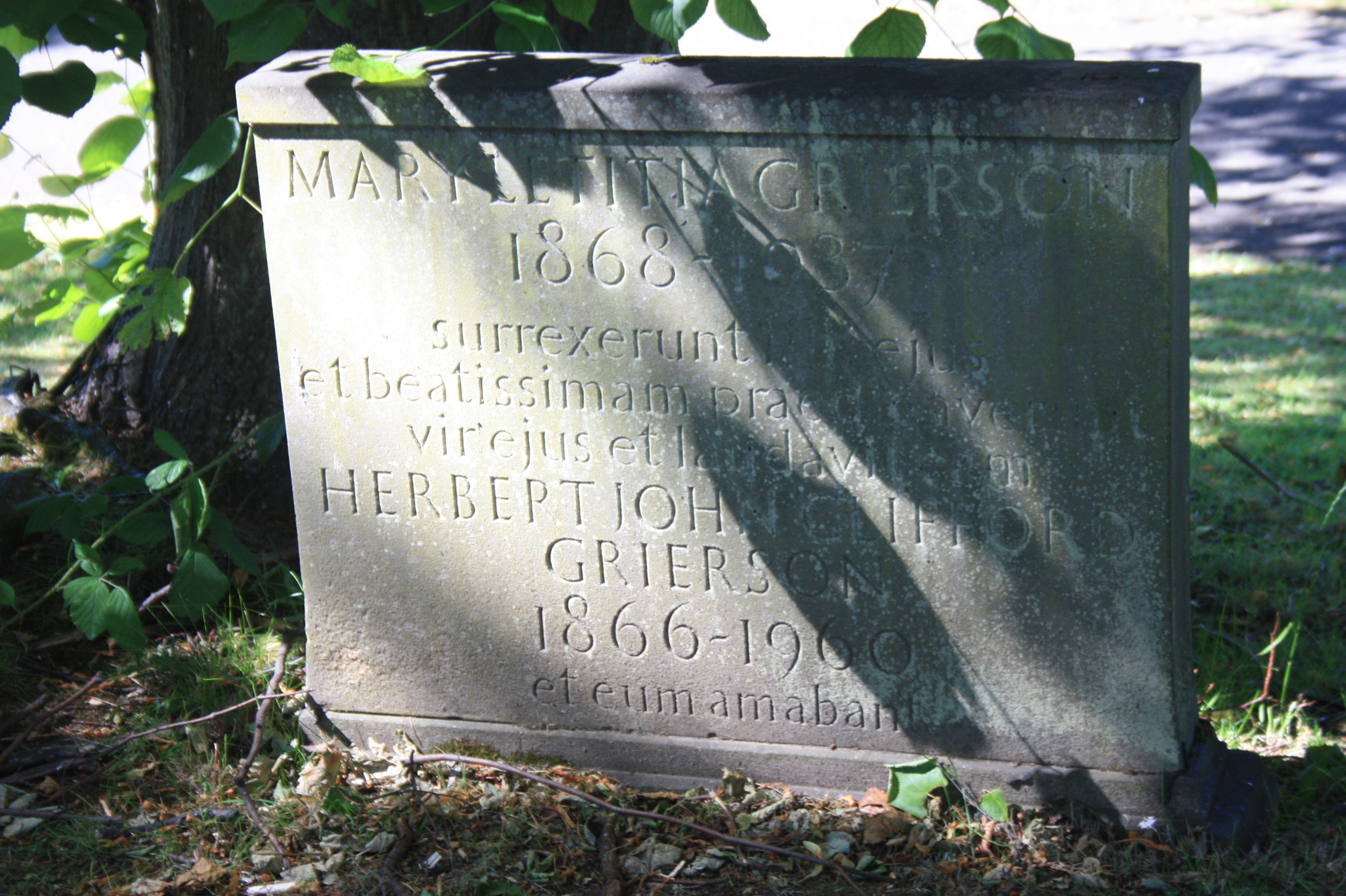
The grave of Herbert Grierson, Dean Cemetery

He was born in Lerwick, Shetland, on 16 January 1866. He was the son of Andrew John Grierson and his wife, Alice Geraldine (née Clifford) Grierson. In 1896 he married Mary Letitia (née Ogston) Grierson, daughter of Sir Alexander Ogston, Professor of Surgery at Aberdeen. They had five daughters including Molly Dickins, author of A Wealth of Relations, about family history, writer Flora Grierson who co-founded the Samson Press, and writer and pianist Janet Teissier du Cros.

He was educated at King's College, University of Aberdeen and Christ Church, Oxford. On graduating from the latter he was appointed Professor of English Literature at his Aberdeen alma mater, where he taught from 1894 to 1915, and subsequently became Knight Professor of English Literature at the University of Edinburgh (1915–1935). In 1938, he was a visiting professor on the William Allan Neilson foundation at Smith College.

In 1920 he delivered the British Academy's Warton Lecture on English Poetry.

He is known for promoting interest in the Metaphysical Poets especially John Donne, a revival supported by T. S. Eliot and Helen Gardner. He wrote in his memoir Vita Mea: ‘By [1909] I was launched on what was to be my magnum opus, the poems of John Donne. This grew quite directly out of my work on the seventeenth century. I had hardly finished this work and had contributed to a series a small selection from Tennyson with an introduction (1907), when I was asked by the editor of the Cambridge History of English Literature, the Master of Peterhouse, to write for the volume of the history then in preparation the chapters on John Donne and on the English Bible. Donne had been a growing interest to me while at work both on my lectures and on the volume just referred to, so for a short time I dallied with both proposals, but ultimately resolved to confine myself to the first. 'Editing Donne’s poems was not unlike editing the poems of one of the ancients, more so than would be the case in dealing with almost any other English poet after the Middle English period. None of his poems, except the two Anniversaries, had been printed during his lifetime. They were contained in a series of editions each of which tended in some degree to corrupt the text, and to add poems which might or might not be by Donne. My business was therefore to settle the canon and the text. Despite the interruptions involved by my work on the English Parnassus, I managed to complete the poems in two volumes in 1912 – text and commentary.’

His special field of research was English poetry of the 17th century, but he was also interested in Walter Scott, and in 1934, published the "Letters of Sir Walter Scott", in six volumes.

== Personal life ==
He lived at 12 Regent Terrace, Edinburgh from 1913 to 1953 and was a member of the Scottish Arts Club. In December 1938, after the death of his first wife, he married Margaret Storrs, former professor of philosophy at Smith College.

He died on 19 February 1960 in Cambridge. He is buried in the modern north extension to Dean Cemetery, off Queensferry Road in western Edinburgh with his wife, Mary Letitia (1868-1937).

== Works ==
- The First Half of the Seventeenth Century (New York: Charles Scribner's Sons, 1906). Vol. VII in the series Periods of European Literature, ed. Professor Saintsbury
- The English Parnassus (1909). An anthology of longer poems, editor with W. MacNeile Dixon
- Poems of Tennyson (1910)
- The Poems of John Donne 2 vols. (Oxford UP, 1912), editor
- Metaphysical Lyrics & Poems of the Seventeenth Century: Donne to Butler (1921)
- Don Quixote: Some War-time Reflections on Its Character and Influence (1921), pamphlet
- William Blake's Designs for Gray's Poems (1922)
- Poems of Lord Byron (1923)
- The Background Of English Literature and Other Collected Essays & Addresses (1925)
- Lyrical Poetry from Blake to Hardy (1928, Hogarth Press)
- Cross-Currents in 17th Century English Literature (1929)
- The Flute, with Other Translations and a Poem (Samson Press, 1931)
- Sir Walter Scott: Broadcast Lectures to the Young (1932)
- Sir Walter Scott To-Day: Some Retrospective Essays and Studies (1932), editor
- The Letters of Sir Walter Scott (from 1932), editor
- Carlyle and Hitler (1933), Adamson Lecture in the University of Manchester (1930)
- Oxford Book of Seventeenth Century Verse (1934), editor with G. Bullough
- Milton and Wordsworth (1937)
- The English Bible (1943)
- A Critical History of English Poetry (1944) with J. C. Smith
- The Personal Note, an Anthology of First and Last Words (1946), editor with Sandys Watson
- Criticism and Creation With Some other Essays (1949)
- Swinburne (1953)

== Sources ==
- Benet's Reader's Encyclopedia (Second edition, 1965)

Academic offices
Preceded by Viscount Allenby	Rector of the University of Edinburgh; 1936–1939	Succeeded by J. Donald Pollock
