= Maxwell Nicholson =

Scottish minister and author

Jonah Maxwell Nicholson (30 July 1818 – 30 December 1874) was a Scottish minister and author.

== Life ==
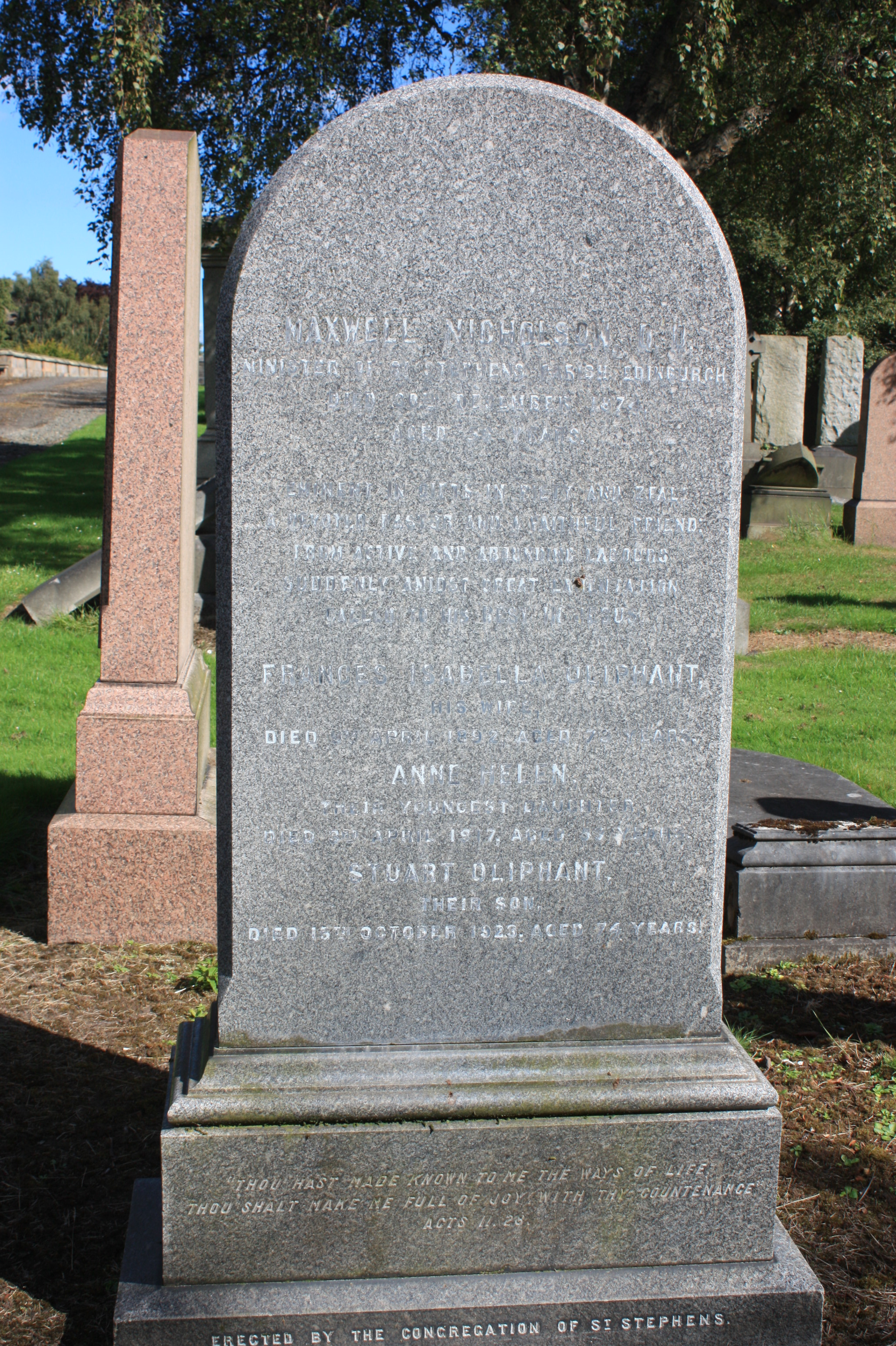
The grave of Maxwell Nicholson, Grange Cemetery, Edinburgh

He was born in Whithorn in south-west Scotland on 30 July 1818 He was the fourth of nine children of Mary Kirkpatrick and her husband, Rev Christopher Nicholson (1780–1867).

He studied divinity at the University of Edinburgh. In 1849 he was minister of Pencaitland in East Lothian. He was minister first of the Tron Kirk on the Royal Mile and latterly (from June 1867) of St Stephen's Church in Stockbridge, Edinburgh in replacement of Rev Dr Muir.

In 1866 he is noted as being seriously injured in a fall from his gig near Tranent railway station.

He lived at 3 Regent Terrace for most of his later life but moved to 7 Royal Circus in 1874. He died there in the early hours of 30 December 1874. He is buried in the south-west section of the original section of Grange Cemetery.

== Publications ==
- Preparation for the Coming of the Son of Man
- Baptism, its Nature, Efficacy and Improvement (1850)
- The Christian Conflict (1861)
- The Heavenly Jerusalem (1866)
- The Faithful Pastor (1869)
- Family Prayers (1874)
- Redeeming the Time and Other Sermons (1875)
- Rest In Jesus (posthumous 1877)
- Communion with Heaven and Other Sermons (posthumous 1877)

== Family ==
He was married to Frances Isabella Oliphant (1818–1892) daughter of James Stuart Oliphant. They had seven children.
