= Emergent evolution =

Evolutionary biology

Emergent evolution is the hypothesis that, in the course of evolution, some entirely new properties, such as mind and consciousness, appear at certain critical points, usually because of an unpredictable rearrangement of the already existing entities. The term was originated by the psychologist C. Lloyd Morgan in 1922 in his Gifford Lectures at St. Andrews, which would later be published as the 1923 book Emergent Evolution.

The hypothesis has been widely criticized for providing no mechanism to how entirely new properties emerge, and for its historical roots in teleology. Historically, emergent evolution has been described as an alternative to materialism and vitalism. Interest in emergent evolution was revived by biologist Robert G. B. Reid in 1985.

Emergent evolution is distinct from the hypothesis of emergent evolutionary potential (EEP) which was introduced in 2019 by Gene Levinson. In EEP, the scientific mechanism of Darwinian natural selection tends to preserve new, more complex entities that arise from interactions between previously existing entities, when those interactions prove useful, by trial-and error, in the struggle for existence. Biological organization arising via EEP is complementary to organization arising via gradual accumulation of incremental variation.

== Historical context ==
The term emergent was first used to describe the concept by George Lewes in volume two of his 1875 book Problems of Life and Mind (p. 412). Henri Bergson covered similar themes in his popular 1907 book Creative Evolution on the Élan vital. Emergence was further developed by Samuel Alexander in his Gifford Lectures at Glasgow during 1916–18 and published as Space, Time, and Deity (1920). The related term emergent evolution was coined by C. Lloyd Morgan in his own Gifford lectures of 1921–22 at St. Andrews and published as Emergent Evolution (1923). In an appendix to a lecture in his book, Morgan acknowledged the contributions of Roy Wood Sellars's Evolutionary Naturalism (1922).

== Origins ==
=== Response to Darwin's Origin of Species ===
Charles Darwin and Alfred Russel Wallace's presentation of natural selection, coupled to the idea of evolution in Western thought, had gained acceptance due to the wealth of observational data provided and the seeming replacement of divine law with natural law in the affairs of men. However, the mechanism of natural selection described at the time only explained how organisms adapted to variation. The cause of genetic variation was unknown at the time.

Darwin knew that nature had to produce variations before natural selection could act …The problem had been caught by other evolutionists almost as soon as The Origin of Species was first published. Sir Charles Lyell saw it clearly in 1860 before he even became an evolutionist…(Reid, p.3)

St. George Jackson Mivart's On the Genesis of Species (1872) and Edward Cope's Origin of the Fittest (1887) raised the need to address the origin of variation between members of a species. William Bateson in 1884 distinguished between the origin of novel variations and the action of natural selection (Materials for the Study of Variation Treated with Especial Regard to Discontinuity in the Origin of Species).

=== Wallace's further thoughts ===
Wallace throughout his life continued to support and extend the scope of Darwin's theory of evolution via the mechanism of natural selection. One of his works, Darwinism, was often cited in support of Darwin's theory. He also worked to elaborate and extend Darwin and his ideas on natural selection. However, Wallace also realized that, as Darwin himself had admitted, the scope and claim of the theory was limited:

the most prominent feature is that I enter into popular yet critical examination of those underlying fundamental problems which Darwin purposely excluded from his works as being beyond the scope of his enquiry. Such are the nature and cause of Life itself, and more especially of its most fundamental and mysterious powers - growth and reproduction ...

Darwin always ... adduced the "laws of Growth with Reproduction," and of "Inheritance with Variability," as being fundamental facts of nature, without which Natural Selection would be powerless or even non-existent ...

... even if it were proved to be an exact representation of the facts, it would not be an explanation... because it would not account for the forces, the directive agency, and the organising power which are essential features of growth …

In examining this aspect, excluded ab initio by Darwin, Wallace came to the conclusion that Life in its essence cannot be understood except through "an organising and directive Life-Principle." These necessarily involve a "Creative Power" possessed of a "directive Mind" working toward "an ultimate Purpose" (the development of Man). It supports the view of John Hunter that "life is the cause, not the consequence" of the organisation of matter. Thus, life precedes matter and infuses it to form living matter (protoplasm).

A very well-founded doctrine, and one which was often advocated by John Hunter, that life is the cause and not the consequence of organisation ... if so, life must be antecedent to organisation, and can only be conceived as indissolubly connected with spirit and with thought, and with the cause of the directive energy everywhere manifested in the growth of living things ... endowed with the mysterious organising power we term life ...

Wallace then refers to the operation of another power called "mind" that utilizes the power of life and is connected with a higher realm than life or matter:

evidence of a foreseeing mind which...so directed and organised that life, in all its myriad forms, as, in the far-off future, to provide all that was most essential for the growth and development of man's spiritual nature ...

Proceeding from Hunter's view that Life is the directive power above and behind living matter, Wallace argues that logically, Mind is the cause of consciousness, which exists in different degrees and kinds in living matter.

If, as John Hunter, T.H. Huxley, and other eminent thinkers have declared, "life is the cause, not the consequence, of organisation," so we may believe that mind is the cause, not the consequence, of brain development. ... So there are undoubtedly different degrees and probably also different kinds of mind in various grades of animal life ... And ... so the mind-giver ... enables each class or order of animals to obtain the amount of mind requisite for its place in nature ...

== Emergent evolution ==
=== Early roots ===
The issue of how order emerged from primordial chaos, by chance or necessity, can be found in classical Greek thought. Aristotle asserted that a whole can be greater than the sum of its parts because of emergent properties. The second-century anatomist and physiologist Galen also distinguished between the resultant and emergent qualities of wholes. (Reid, p. 72)

Hegel spoke of the revolutionary progression of life from non-living to conscious and then to the spiritual and Kant perceived that simple parts of an organism interact to produce a progressively complex series of emergences of functional forms, a distinction that carried over to John Stuart Mill (1843), who stated that even chemical compounds have novel features that cannot be predicted from their elements. [Reid, p. 72]

The idea of an entirely novel emergent quality was further taken up by George Henry Lewes (1874–1875), who reiterated Galen's distinction between evolutionary "emergent" qualities and adaptive, additive "resultants." Henry Drummond in The Descent of Man (1894) stated that emergence can be seen in the fact that the laws of nature are different for the organic or vital compared to inert inorganic matter.

When we pass from the inorganic to the organic we come upon a new set of laws - but the reason why the lower set do not seem to operate in the higher sphere is not that they are annhilated, but that they are overruled. (Drummond 1883, p. 405, quoted in Reid)

As Reid points out, Drummond also realized that greater complexity brought greater adaptability. (Reid. p. 73)

Samuel Alexander took up the idea that emergences had properties that overruled the demands of the lower levels of organization. And more recently, this theme is taken up by John Holland (1998):

If we turn reductionism on its head we add levels. More carefully, we add new laws that satisfy the constraints imposed by laws already in place. Moreover these new laws apply to complex phenomena that are consequences of the original laws; they are at a new level.

=== C. Lloyd Morgan and emergent evolution ===
Another major scientist to question natural selection as the motive force of evolution was C. Lloyd Morgan, a zoologist and student of T.H. Huxley, who had a strong influence on Samuel Alexander. His Emergent Evolution (1923) established the central idea that an emergence might have the appearance of saltation but was best regarded as "a qualitative change of direction or critical turning point."(quoted in Reid, p. 73-74) Morgan, due to his work in animal psychology, had earlier (1894) questioned the continuity view of mental evolution, and held that there were various discontinuities in cross-species mental abilities. To offset any attempt to read anthropomorphism into his view, he created the famous, but often misunderstood methodological canon:

In no case may we interpret an action as the outcome of the exercise of a higher psychical faculty, if it can be interpreted as the outcome of the exercise of one which stands lower in the psychological scale.

— Morgan, 1894, p. 53

However, Morgan realizing that this was being misused to advocate reductionism (rather than as a general methodological caution), introduced a qualification into the second edition of his An Introduction to Comparative Psychology (1903):

To this, however, it should be added, lest the range of the principle be misunderstood, that the canon by no means excludes the interpretation of a particular activity in terms of the higher processes, if we already have independent evidence of the occurrence of these higher processes in the animal under observation.

— Morgan, 1903, p. 59

As Reid observes,

While the so-called historiographical "rehabilitation of the canon" has been underway for some time now, Morgan's emergent evolutionist position (which was the highest expression of his attempt to place the study of mind back into such a "wider" natural history) is seldom mentioned in more than passing terms even within contemporary history of psychology textbooks.

Morgan also fought against the behaviorist school and clarified even more his emergent views on evolution:

An influential school of 'behaviorists' roundly deny that mental relations, if such there be, are in any sense or in any manner effective... My message is that one may speak of mental relations as effective no less 'scientifically' than... physical relations...

— Morgan, 1930, p. 72

His Animal Conduct (1930) explicitly distinguishes between three "grades" or "levels of mentality" which he labeled: 'percipient, perceptive, and reflective.' (p. 42)

=== Alexander and the emergence of mind ===
Morgan's idea of a polaric relationship between lower and higher, was taken up by Samuel Alexander, who argued that the mental process is not reducible to the neural processes on which it depends at the physical-material level. Instead, they are two poles of a unity of function. Further, the neural process that expressed mental process itself possesses a quality (mind) that the other neural processes don’t. At the same time, the mental process, because it is functionally identical to this particular neural process, is also a vital one.

And mental process is also "something new, "a fresh creation", which precludes a psycho-physiological parallelism. Reductionism is also contrary to empirical fact. At the same time Alexander stated that his view was not one of animism or vitalism, where the mind is an independent entity action on the brain, or conversely, acted upon by the brain. Mental activity is an emergent, new "thing" not reducible to its initial neural parts.

All the available evidence of fact leads to the conclusion that the mental element is essential to the neural process which it is said to accompany...and is not accidental to it, nor is it in turn indifferent to the mental feature. Epiphenomenalism is a mere fallacy of observation.

For Alexander, the world unfolds in space-time, which has the inherent quality of motion. This motion through space-time results in new “complexities of motion” in the form of a new quality or emergent. The emergent retains the qualities of the prior “complexities of motion” but also has something new that was not there before. This something new comes with its own laws of behavior. Time is the quality that creates motion through Space, and matter is simply motion expressed in forms in Space, or as Alexander says a little later, “complexes of motion.” Matter arises out of the basic ground of Space-Time continuity and has an element of “body” (lower order) and an element of “mind” (higher order), or “the conception that a secondary quality is the mind of its primary substrate.”

Mind is an emergent from life and life itself is an emergent from matter. Each level contains and is interconnected with the level and qualities below it, and to the extent that it contains lower levels, these aspects are subject to the laws of that level. All mental functions are living, but not all living functions are mental; all living functions are physico-chemical, but not all physico-chemical processes are living - just as we could say that all people living in Ohio are Americans, but not all Americans live in Ohio. Thus, there are levels of existence, or natural jurisdictions, within a given higher level such that the higher level contains elements of each of the previous levels of existence. The physical level contains the pure dimensionality of Space-Time in addition to the emergent of physico-chemical processes; the next emergent level, life, also contains Space-Time as well as the physico-chemical in addition to the quality of life; the level of mind contains all of the previous three levels, plus consciousness. As a result of this nesting and inter-action of emergents, like fluid Russian dolls, higher emergents cannot be reduced to lower ones, and different laws and methods of inquiry are required for each level.

Life is not an epiphenomenon of matter but an emergent from it ... The new character or quality which the vital physico-chemical complex possesses stands to it as soul or mind to the neural basis.

For Alexander, the "directing agency" or entelechy is found "in the principle or plan".

a given stage of material complexity is characterised by such and such special features…By accepting this we at any rate confine ourselves to noting the facts…and do not invent entities for which there seems to be no other justification than that something is done in life which is not done in matter.

While an emergent is a higher complexity, it also results in a new simplicity as it brings a higher order into what was previously less ordered (a new simplex out of a complex). This new simplicity does not carry any of the qualities or aspects of that emergent level prior to it, but as noted, does still carry within it such lower levels so can be understood to that extent through the science of such levels, yet not itself be understood except by a science that is able to reveal the new laws and principles applicable to it.

Ascent takes place, it would seem, through complexity.[increasing order] But at each change of quality the complexity as it were gathers itself together and is expressed in a new simplicity.

Within a given level of emergence, there are degrees of development.

... There are on one level degrees of perfection or development; and at the same time there is affinity by descent between the existents belonging to the level. This difference of perfection is not the same thing as difference of order or rank such as subsists between matter and life or life and mind ...

The concept or idea of mind, the highest emergent known to us, being at our level, extends all the way down to pure dimensionality or Space-Time. In other words, time is the “mind” of motion, materialising is the “mind” of matter, living the “mind” of life. Motion through pure time (or life astronomical, mind ideational) emerges as matter “materialising” (geological time, life geological, mind existential), and this emerges as life “living” (biological time, life biological, mind experiential), which in turn give us mind “minding” (historical time, life historical, mind cognitional). But there is also an extension possible upwards of mind to what we call Deity.

let us describe the empirical quality of any kind of finite which performs to it the office of consciousness or mind as its 'mind.' Yet at the same time let us remember that the 'mind' of a living thing is not conscious mind but is life, and has not the empirical character of consciousness at all, and that life is not merely a lower degree of mind or consciousness, but something different. We are using 'mind' metaphorically by transference from real minds and applying it to the finites on each level in virtue of their distinctive quality; down to Space-Time itself whose existent complexes of bare space-time have for their mind bare time in its empirical variations.

Alexander goes back to the Greek idea of knowledge being “out there” in the object being contemplated. In that sense, there is not mental object (concept) “distinct” (that is, different in state of being) from the physical object, but only an apparent split between the two, which can then be brought together by proper compresence or participation of the consciousness in the object itself.

There is no consciousness lodged, as I have supposed, in the organism as a quality of the neural response; consciousness belongs to the totality of objects, of what are commonly called the objects of consciousness or the field of consciousness ... Consciousness is therefore "out there" where the objects are, by a new version of Berkleyanism ... Obviously for this doctrine as for mine there is no mental object as distinct from a physical object: the image of a tree is a tree in an appropriate form...

Because of the interconnectedness of the universe by virtue of Space-Time, and because the mind apprehends space, time and motion through a unity of sense and mind experience, there is a form of knowing that is intuitive (participative) - sense and reason are outgrowths from it.

In being conscious of its own space and time, the mind is conscious of the space and time of external things and vice versa. This is a direct consequence of the continuity of Space-Time in virtue of which any point-instant is connected sooner or later, directly or indirectly, with every other... The mind therefore does not apprehend the space of its objects, that is their shape, size and locality, by sensation, for it depends for its character on mere spatio-temporal conditions, though it is not to be had as consciousness in the absence of sensation (or else of course ideation). It is clear without repeating these considerations that the same proposition is true of Time; and of motion ... I shall call this mode of apprehension in its distinction from sensation, intuition. ... Intuition is different from reason, but reason and sense alike are outgrowths from it, empirical determinations of it...

In a sense, the universe is a participative one and open to participation by mind as well so that mind can intuitively know an object, contrary to what Kant asserted. Participation (togetherness) is something that is “enjoyed” (experienced) not contemplated, though in the higher level of consciousness, it would be contemplated.

The universe for Alexander is essentially in process, with Time as its ongoing aspect, and the ongoing process consists in the formation of changing complexes of motions. These complexes become ordered in repeatable ways displaying what he calls "qualities." There is a hierarchy of kinds of organized patterns of motions, in which each level depends on the subvening level, but also displays qualities not shown at the subvening level nor predictable from it… On this there sometimes supervenes a further level with the quality called "life"; and certain subtle syntheses which carry life are the foundation for a further level with a new quality. "mind." This is the highest level known to us, but not necessarily the highest possible level. The universe has a forward thrust, called its "nisus" (broadly to be identified with the Time aspect) in virtue of which further levels are to be expected...

=== Robert G. B. Reid ===
Emergent evolution was revived by Robert G. B. Reid (March 20, 1939 - May 28, 2016), a biology professor at the University of Victoria (in British Columbia, Canada). In his book Evolutionary Theory: The Unfinished Synthesis (1985), he stated that the modern evolutionary synthesis with its emphasis on natural selection is an incomplete picture of evolution, and emergent evolution can explain the origin of genetic variation. Biologist Ernst Mayr heavily criticized the book claiming it was a misinformed attack on natural selection. Mayr commented that Reid was working from an "obsolete conceptual framework", provided no solid evidence and that he was arguing for a teleological process of evolution. In 2004, biologist Samuel Scheiner stated that Reid's "presentation is both a caricature of evolutionary theory and severely out of date."

Reid later published the book Biological Emergences (2007) with a theory on how emergent novelties are generated in evolution. According to Massimo Pigliucci "Biological Emergences by Robert Reid is an interesting contribution to the ongoing debate on the status of evolutionary theory, but it is hard to separate the good stuff from the more dubious claims." Pigliucci noted a dubious claim in the book is that natural selection has no role in evolution. It was positively reviewed by biologist Alexander Badyaev who commented that "the book succeeds in drawing attention to an under appreciated aspect of the evolutionary process". Others have criticized Reid's unorthodox views on emergence and evolution.

== See also ==
- The eclipse of Darwinism
- Emergentism is a corresponding belief in emergence.
- Evolutionary biology
- Orthogenesis
- Vitalism
