= Samson Press =

British private press

The Samson Press was a small letterpress printing business or private press run by Joan Mary Shelmerdine (1899–1994) and Flora Margaret Grierson (1899–1966). In its early years it was known for producing small editions of literary works with high quality artwork, and later for the production of greetings cards and ephemera to the same high standards.

== History ==
Shelmerdine and Grierson began printing in 1930, at a cottage in Stuart Road, Warlingham in Surrey, and produced a number of small books and a good deal of ephemera. They exhibited their work in Edinburgh: first at Grierson's family home in 1934 and then "books, woodcuts, lino-cuts, new Christmas cards" at Parsons' Gallery, Queen Street. The press was destroyed by fire in late 1936 and they subsequently moved to Woodstock in Oxfordshire, where they re-established the press in 1937. Their Woodstock premises in Park Street are now marked by a plaque. They ceased printing for a while during the war, but re-opened the press in 1946 and continued to work, mostly producing greetings cards and other ephemera, until 1967, when the press was formally closed (following the death of Grierson in the previous year). Shelmerdine subsequently presented the press's archive, along with its type and printing equipment, to the Bodleian Library in Oxford.

The Samson Press was unusual for being run by two women, on a commercial footing, at a time when women found it very hard to find practical employment in the printing industry. It was also notable for its patronage of young and unknown artists, who were commissioned to provide wood-engravings, linocuts and drawings for the press's publications. Iain Macnab was an early friend of the press, and produced numerous images for Grierson and Shelmerdine, and some of the other artists employed by the press, such as Tom Chadwick and Gwenda Morgan, were pupils at Macnab's Grosvenor School of Art.

Their distinctive books have been collected by libraries and private collectors, although their commercial success as printers and publishers was always limited. Art historian Sir John Boardman has said that "Samson Press was a very important place and had a wonderful Art Deco and Art Nouveau style at the beginning of the war." In the 1930s the press did some printing on vellum.

Some of Samson's authors were personal friends, like Edwin and Willa Muir. Edwin Muir expressed his gratitude for a "beautiful volume" of his work (Six Poems, 1932) in the preface to a later collection of poetry. In 1932 the press published 5 songs from the Auvergnat; done into Modern Scots, by Willa Muir. She and Flora Grierson co-authored an unpublished piece called Alas, We females! A Modest Proposal for the Solution of Many Problems by the Abolition of the Female Sex.

== Grierson and Shelmerdine ==
Flora Lucy Margaret Grierson (1899–1966) was one of five daughters born in Aberdeen to Mary and Herbert Grierson, a scholar and academic. The family moved to Edinburgh when Flora was about 16. Seen as the "brilliant" one in a literary household she went to Oxford University and "flourished" there, according to her sister, writer Janet Teissier du Cros. It was at Somerville College, Oxford that she met Joan Shelmerdine. Before moving to Surrey in 1930 they shared a flat in London. Grierson published her first book Haunting Edinburgh in 1929, with illustrations by Katharine Cameron, whose work was also used at the Samson Press. In 1933 her translation from Latin of Historia de Duobus Amantibus by Aeneas Sylvius Piccolomini (Pope Pius II) was published as The Tale of the Two Lovers. Her book The Story of Woodstock Gloves was published by Samson in 1962. She died in 1966.

Joan Mary Shelmerdine (1899–1994) was born in Lancashire and studied French at Somerville College, Oxford where she met Flora Grierson. In 1929 she published a translation with introduction to The Secret History of Henrietta, Princess of England, first wife of Philippe, Duc d'Orléans, together with Memoirs of the Court of France for the Years 1688-1689. In 1951 Samson published her Introduction to Woodstock, with drawings by Iain Macnab. When Shelmerdine died in 1994, the death announcement in The Times described her as "Founder of the Samson Press and lifelong friend of the late Flora Grierson".
