= Peter Hay Hunter =

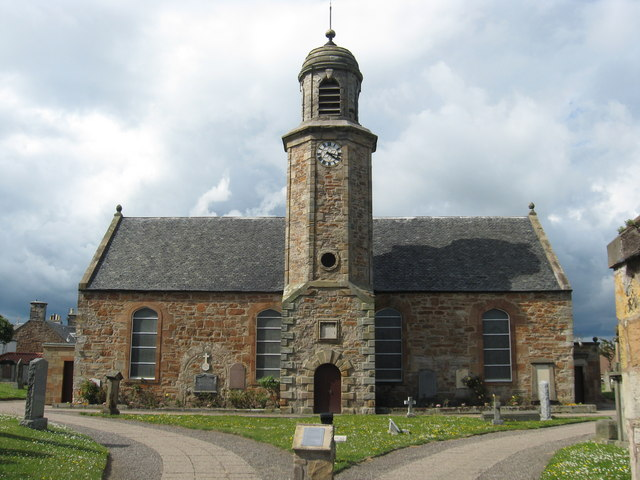
Elie Parish Church

Peter Hay Hunter (1854–1909) was a minister of the Church of Scotland and a prolific author.

== Life ==
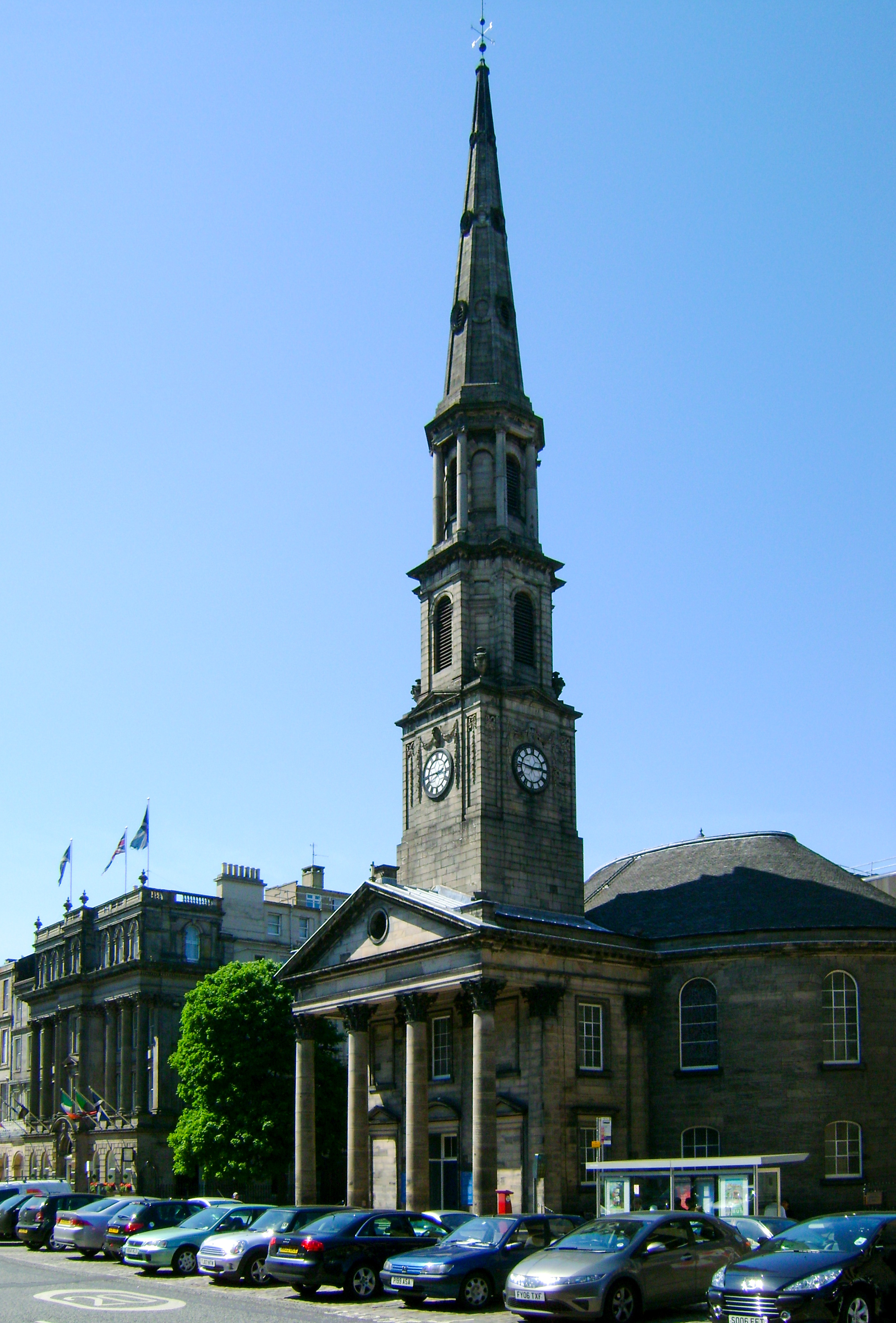
St Andrew's Church in Edinburgh

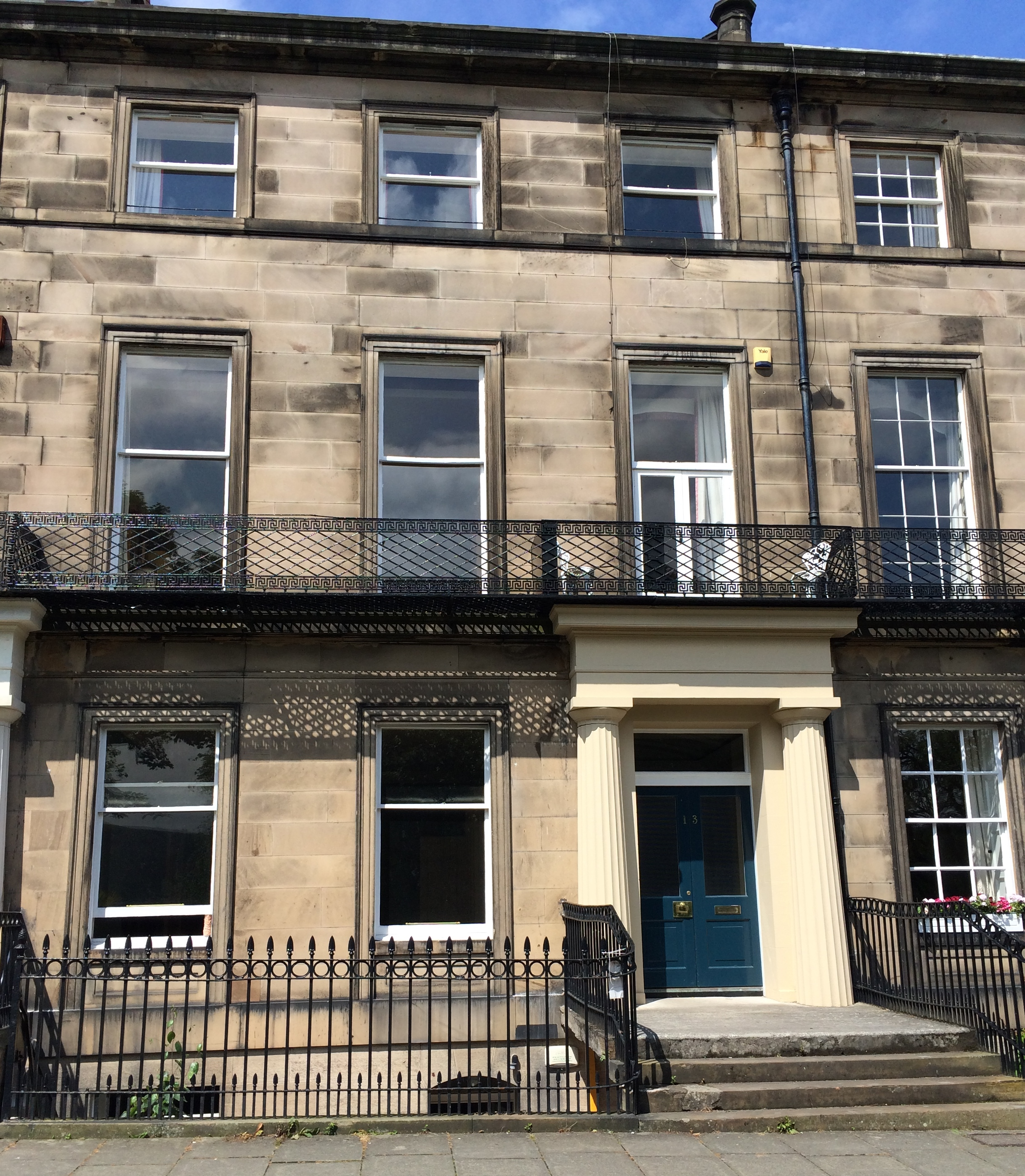
13 Regent Terrace, Edinburgh, home of Rev Hunter

He was born in Edinburgh on 10 September 1854 the son of Ann Hay and her husband James Hunter, a paper merchant. Hunter had a comprehensive university education including University of Edinburgh, Leipzig University in Germany and the Sorbonne University in Paris, France. He graduated with an MA from the University of Edinburgh in 1877. He was licensed by the Presbytery of Edinburgh in 1881.

His first role was as assistant at Elgin Parish Church. He was ordained as minister of Elie Parish Church on the Fife coast in April 1883, translating to Yester Parish Church in East Lothian in August 1886. This was almost certainly with the patronage of the Marquess of Tweeddale for whom he acted in the official capacity as Chaplain to the Lord High Commissioner for the periods 1890 to 1892 and 1896 to 1897.

In February 1896 he moved to the prestigious St Andrews Church in Edinburgh's New Town. He was then living at 13 Regent Terrace on Calton Hill in east Edinburgh. The University of Edinburgh gave him an honorary Doctor of Divinity (DD) in 1902.

He lived his final years at 35 Great King Street in a large Georgian house in Edinburgh's New Town.

Hunter died in Edinburgh on 26 December 1909. His position at St Andrews Church was filled by Rev George Christie.

== Family ==
In September 1886 he married Helen Dawson, daughter of James Dawson of Dalkeith.

== Publications ==
Hunter wrote a mix of religious subject matter and crime novels. Several of his books remain in print. As an author of crime he usually wrote as P. Hay Hunter.

- The Story of Daniel (1883)
- My Ducats and my Daughter (1884)
- The Crime of Christmas Day (1885)
- After the Exile: 100 Years of Jewish History and Literature (1889)
- Sons of the Croft (1893)
- James Inwick: Ploughman and Elder (1894)
- The Silver Bullet (1894)
- John Armiger's Revenge (1897)
- Bible and Sword (1904)

Hunter had two periods of writing serials for Life and Work: "Gruppy Davy" in 1895 and "The Tacksman of Uavaig" in 1903.
