= Forrest Hill drill hall =

Former drill hall in Edinburgh, Scotland

- Edinburgh, Scotland
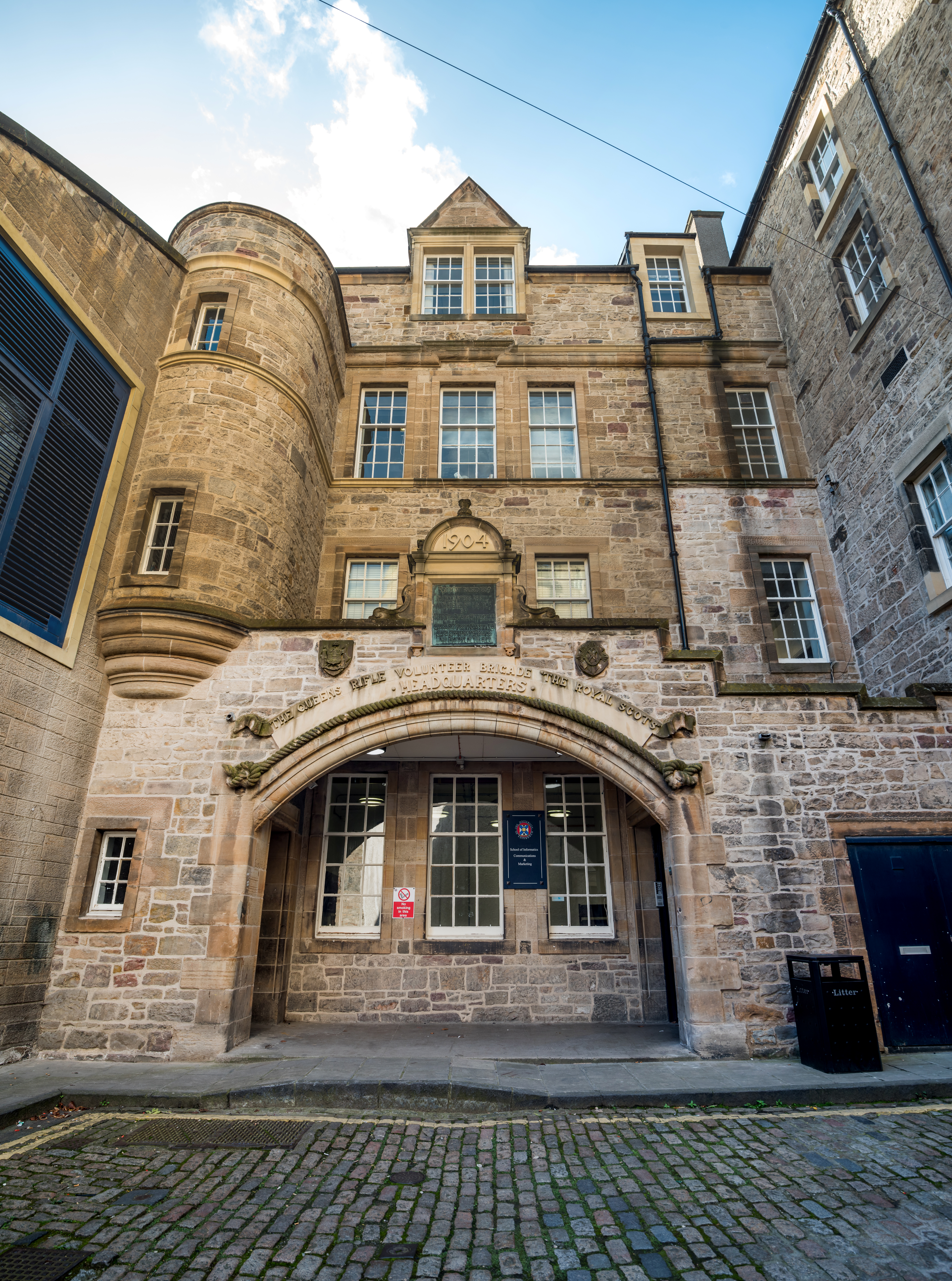
- Forrest Hill drill hall

Site information
- Type: Drill hall

Location
- Location in Edinburgh
- Coordinates: 55.94590°N 3.19203°W

Site history
- Built: 1872
- Built for: War Office
- Architect: Duncan Menzies
- In use: 1872 – 1993

Listed Building – Category B
- Designated: 8 May 1975
- Reference no.: LB27773

The Forrest Hill drill hall is a former military installation in Edinburgh, Scotland. The building is now owned by the University of Edinburgh.

== History ==
The building was designed by Duncan Menzies as the headquarters of the Queen's Edinburgh Rifles and completed in 1872. Following extensive refurbishment work the building was re-opened by the Duke of Connaught in May 1905.

The Queen's Edinburgh Rifle Volunteer Brigade became the 4th and 5th (Queen's Edinburgh Rifles) Battalions, the Royal Scots in 1908. The battalions were mobilised at the drill hall in August 1914 before being deployed to Gallipoli and then to the Western Front. The 4th and 5th battalions amalgamated to form the 4th/5th (Queen's Edinburgh Rifles) Battalion, with its headquarters at the Forrest Hill drill hall in 1922. In 1939 the battalion converted to manning searchlights and, in 1940, became an anti-aircraft regiment of the Royal Artillery.

The drill hall was the home of the Edinburgh University Officers' Training Corps and its successors, the Edinburgh and Heriot-Watt Universities OTC and the City of Edinburgh Universities OTC, from 1957 until the Universities OTC moved to Duke of Edinburgh House in Colinton Road, Edinburgh in 1993. The building was decommissioned and taken over by the University of Edinburgh in the mid-1990s. The building then became the location of the Department of Artificial Intelligence.
