= Norman Kemp Smith =

Scottish philosopher

Norman Kemp Smith FBA FRSE
- Smith, photographed in 1947 by Walter Stoneman
- Born: Norman Duncan Smith; 5 May 1872; Dundee, Scotland
- Died: 3 September 1958 (aged 86); Edinburgh, Scotland

Education
- Education: University of St Andrews
- Academic advisor: Robert Adamson

Philosophical work
- Era: 20th-century philosophy
- Region: Western philosophy
- School: Kantianism
- Institutions: Princeton University; University of Edinburgh
- Notable students: John Anderson; John McIntyre; Thomas F. Torrance
- Main interests: History of philosophy Philosophy of religion

Norman Kemp Smith (born Norman Duncan Smith; 5 May 1872 – 3 September 1958) was a Scottish philosopher who was Professor of Psychology (1906–1914) and Philosophy (1914–1919) at Princeton University and was Professor of Logic and Metaphysics at the University of Edinburgh (1919–1945).

Smith is noted for his 1929 English translation of Immanuel Kant's Critique of Pure Reason, which for a long time was considered the standard version.

== Early life and education ==
Norman Smith was born on 5 May 1872 in Dundee, Scotland, the son of a cabinet-maker on the Nethergate. He was educated in Dundee and then studied mental philosophy at the University of St Andrews, graduating with an MA with first-class honours in 1893. He received his doctorate (PhD) in 1902.

== Career ==
Smith lectured in philosophy and psychology at Princeton University from 1906 to 1916, and at the University of Edinburgh from 1919 until his retirement in 1945. He was elected a Fellow of the Royal Society of Edinburgh in 1921. His proposers were Ralph Allan Sampson, Thomas John Jehu, Charles Glover Barkla and Charles Sarolea. In 1932 he delivered the Adamson Lecture of the Victoria University of Manchester.

In 1938 he moved to 14 Kilgraston Road in south Edinburgh, a house designed by Sir Robert Matthew.

His translation of Immanuel Kant's Critique of Pure Reason is often used as the standard English version of the text. His commentaries on the Critique are also well regarded, as are his works on David Hume and other philosophers. He was president of the Aristotelian Society from 1947 to 1948. A portrait by the Edinburgh artist Adam Bruce Thomson is held by the University of Edinburgh's Fine Art Collection.

Kemp Smith died on 3 September 1958 in Edinburgh.

== Family ==
In 1910 he married Amy Kemp (d.1936), and thereafter became known as Norman Kemp Smith.

== Legacy ==
The Kemp Smith Room in the University of Edinburgh's Philosophy Department is named in his honour.

== Books and articles ==
- Studies in the Cartesian Philosophy (New York: Macmillan, 1902)
- "The Naturalism of Hume (I)" and "The Naturalism of Hume (II)", Mind, 14 (1905) Nos. 54 and 55: 149–73 and 335–47
- "Subjectivism and Realism in Modern Philosophy", The Philosophical Review, 17 (1908) No. 2: 138–48
- "How Far Is Agreement Possible in Philosophy?", The Journal of Philosophy, Psychology, and Scientific Methods, 9 (1912) No. 26: 701–11
- "Kant’s Relation to Hume and Leibniz", The Philosophical Review, 24 (1915) No. 3: 288–96 doi:10.2307/2178334
- A Commentary to Kant's 'Critique of Pure Reason (London: Macmillan, 1918)
- Prolegomena to an Idealist Theory of Knowledge (London: Macmillan, 1924)
- The Philosophy of David Hume: A Critical Study of Its Origins and Central Doctrines. London: Macmillan. 1941. ISBN 978-0-8240-5412-0 – via Internet Archive.
- New Studies in the Philosophy of Descartes (1951)
- The Credibility of Divine Existence. The Collected Papers of Norman Kemp Smith, edited by A. J. D. Porteous, R. D. MacLennan, and G. E. Davie (1967)
