= C. Lloyd Morgan =

British ethologist and psychologist (1852–1936)

C. Lloyd Morgan FRS
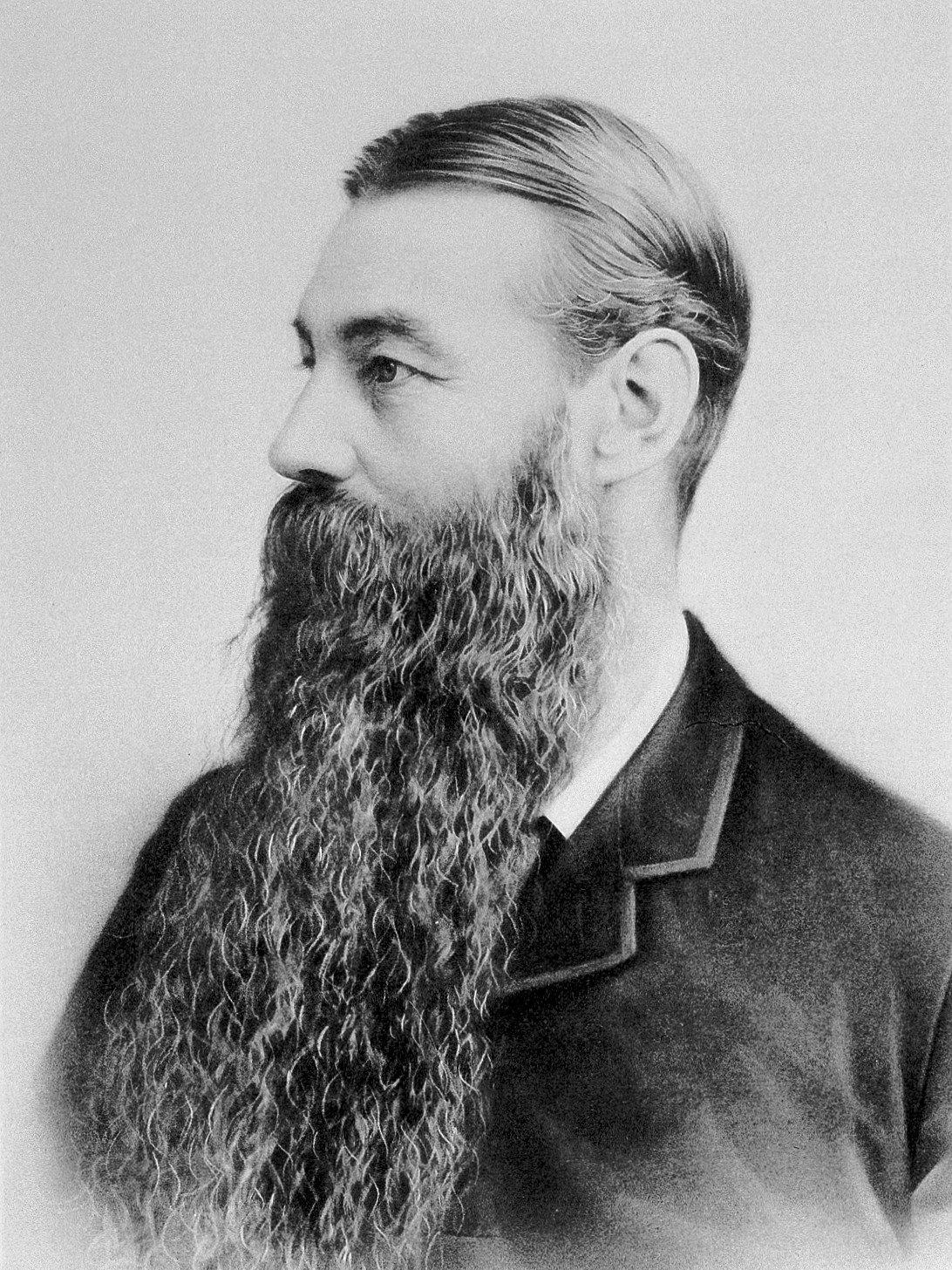
- Morgan in 1898
- Born: Conwy Lloyd Morgan; 6 February 1852; London, England
- Died: 6 March 1936 (aged 84); Hastings, England
- Education: Royal School of Mines
- Employer: University College, Bristol
- Known for: Morgan's Canon

Conwy Lloyd Morgan, FRS (6 February 1852 – 6 March 1936) was a British ethologist and psychologist. He is remembered for his theory of emergent evolution, and for the experimental approach to animal psychology now known as Morgan's Canon, a principle that played a major role in behaviourism, insisting that higher mental faculties should only be considered as explanations if lower faculties could not explain a behaviour.

== Life ==
Conwy Lloyd Morgan was born in London and studied at the Royal School of Mines and subsequently under T. H. Huxley. He taught in Cape Town, but in 1884 joined the staff of the then University College, Bristol as Professor of Geology and Zoology, and carried out some research of local interest in those fields. However, he quickly became interested in the field he called "mental evolution", the borderland between intelligence and instinct, and in 1901 moved to become the college's first Professor of Psychology and Education. He was elected a Fellow of the Royal Society in 1899, and gave the Croonian Lecture in 1901, titled Studies in visual sensation.

In addition to his scientific work, Lloyd Morgan was active in academic administration. He became Principal of the University College, Bristol, in 1891, playing a central role in the campaign to secure it full university sltatus. In 1893, he enrolled his son, C. Lloyd Morgan, at Bristol's Clifton College. In 1909, when, with the award of a Royal Charter, the University College, Bristol became the University of Bristol and he was appointed as its first Vice-Chancellor, an office he held for a year before deciding to become Professor of Psychology and Ethics until his retirement in 1919. He was president of the Aristotelian Society from 1926 to 1927.

Following his retirement, Lloyd Morgan delivered a series of Gifford Lectures at St. Andrews in 1921 and 1922 in which he discussed the concept of emergent evolution.

Conwy Lloyd Morgan died in Hastings.

== Ethology ==
=== Morgan's Canon ===
Morgan's Canon played a critical role in the growth of behaviourism in twentieth century academic psychology. The canon states: In no case may we interpret an action as the outcome of the exercise of a higher mental faculty, if it can be interpreted as the exercise of one which stands lower in the psychological scale. For example, Morgan considered that an entity should only be considered conscious if there is no other explanation for its behaviour.

W. H. Thorpe commented as follows:

The importance of this was enormous... [but] to the modern ethologist dealing with higher animals and faced as he is with ever-increasing evidence for the complexity of perceptual organisation... the very reverse of Morgan's canon often proves to be the best strategy.

The development of Morgan's Canon derived partly from his observations of behaviour. This provided cases where behaviour that seemed to imply higher mental processes could be explained by simple trial and error learning (what we would now call operant conditioning). An example is the skilful way in which his terrier Tony opened the garden gate, easily imagined as an insightful act by someone seeing the final behaviour. Lloyd Morgan, however, had watched and recorded the series of approximations by which the dog had gradually learned the response, and could demonstrate that no insight was required to explain it.

=== Instinct versus learning ===
Lloyd Morgan carried out extensive research to separate, as far as possible, inherited behaviour from learnt behaviour. Eggs of chicks, ducklings and moorhens were raised in an incubator, and the hatchlings kept from adult birds. Their behaviour after hatching was recorded in detail. Lastly, the behaviour was interpreted as simply as possible. Lloyd Morgan was not the first to work on these questions. Douglas Spalding in the 1870s had done some remarkable work on inherited behaviour in birds. His early death in 1877 led to his work being largely forgotten until the 1950s, but Lloyd Morgan cited Spalding's observations in his own work.

== Quotations ==
- Given two different minds and the same facts, how different are the products! – Animal Life and Intelligence (1891), page 335

== Books ==
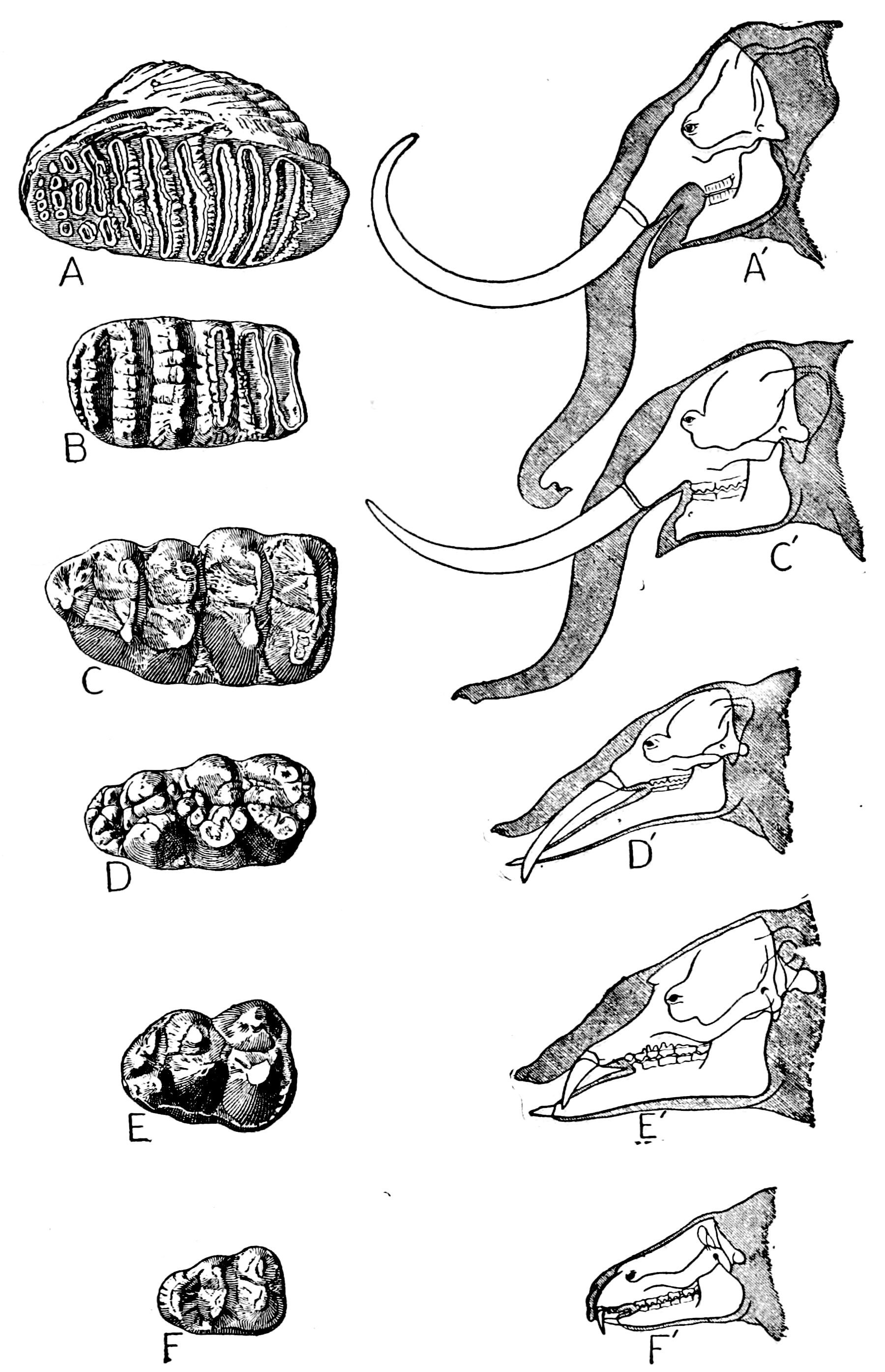
Creation by evolution

- The springs of conduct: an essay in evolution. (1885). Kegan Paul, London.
- Animal biology. (1887). Rivington, London.
- Animal sketches. [1891]. Arnold, London.
- Animal life and intelligence. (1891). Arnold, London.
- Introduction to comparative psychology. (1894). Routledgethoemmes, London.
- Psychology for teachers. (1894). Arnold, London.
- Habit and instinct. (1896). Arnold, London.
- Animal behaviour. (1900). Arnold, London.
- The interpretation of nature. (1906).
- Instinct and experience. (1912). Methuen, London.
- Spencer's Philosophy of Science. (1919). Oxford University Press.
- Emergent evolution. (1923). Henry Holt.
- Life, mind, and spirit. (1925). Henry Holt.
- Creation by Evolution. (1928). The Macmillan Company, New York.
- Mind at the crossways. (1929).
- Animal Mind. (1930). Arnold, London
- The emergence of novelty. (1933).

Preceded by (None)	Vice-Chancellor of the University of Bristol; 1909	Succeeded by Sir Isambard Owen
