= Samuel Alexander =

Australian-born British philosopher (1859-1938)

Samuel Alexander OM FBA
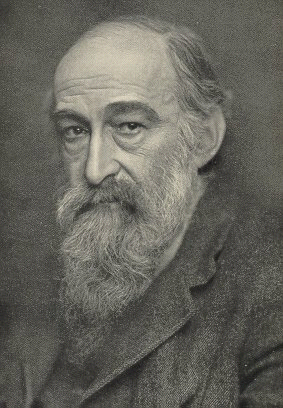
- Born: 6 January 1859; Sydney, New South Wales, Australia
- Died: 13 September 1938 (aged 79); Manchester, England

Education
- Education: Wesley College, Melbourne; University of Melbourne; Balliol College, Oxford
- Academic advisors: F. H. Bradley; Hugo Münsterberg

Philosophical work
- Era: 20th-century philosophy
- Region: Western philosophy
- School: British new realism
- Institutions: Lincoln College, Oxford; Owens College, Manchester
- Main interests: Metaphysics, theology, aesthetics
- Notable ideas: Emergent evolution

Samuel Alexander OM FBA (6 January 1859 – 13 September 1938) was an Australian-born British philosopher. He was the first Jewish fellow of an Oxbridge college. He is now best known as an advocate of emergentism in biology.

== Early life ==
He was born into a Jewish family at 436 George Street, Sydney, Australia, the third son of Samuel Alexander, a prosperous saddler, and Eliza née Sloman. His father died around the time he was born, of tuberculosis. Eliza moved the family to St Kilda, Victoria in 1863 or 1864, and Alexander was tutored, and placed at a private school. In 1871, he was sent to Wesley College, Melbourne, then under the headmastership of Martin Howy Irving.

Alexander matriculated at the University of Melbourne on 22 March 1875. He completed the first two years with distinction, but then left without taking a degree.

== Academic career ==
In May 1877, Alexander sailed for England in an attempt to win a scholarship at Oxford or Cambridge. He was successful at Balliol College, Oxford, and matriculated there on 28 January 1878. He graduated B.A. in 1881, was elected a Fellow of Lincoln College in 1882, and graduated M.A. in 1884. He remained as philosophy tutor at Lincoln College to 1893. It was during this period that he developed his interest in psychology, then a neglected subject. He travelled on the continent of Europe, and in the winter of 1890–91 was in Germany working on experimental psychology at the laboratory of Hugo Münsterberg at Freiburg.

Alexander for much of his life was deaf, which acted as a handicap. For some time, he wanted to obtain a professorship. He made three unsuccessful attempts before he was appointed at Owens College, Manchester in 1893. Among his colleagues there was the educational theorist Catherine Isabella Dodd, whom he admired. Another educationalist he found impressive was Esther Lawrence, a cousin.

Robert Mackintosh (1858–1933) owed his appointment as lecturer in 1904 to the new Manchester theological faculty in 1904 to Alexander, he believed. Alexander introduced experimental psychology at Manchester in 1907, in unorthodox fashion, with the appointment of Tom Pear (1886–1972), later a professor. Pear was recruited while still an undergraduate, but was backed by Charles Sherrington, who had brought William George Smith as a lecturer to the University of Liverpool in 1905. He invited John Macmurray to be a lecturer in the philosophy department in 1919.

Alexander was president of the Aristotelian Society from 1908 to 1911, and again from 1936 to 1937. In 1913, he was made a Fellow of the British Academy. R. G. Collingwood met Alexander in 1917, when both were working for the United Kingdom, and they kept in touch on philosophy for the rest of Alexander's life. Collingwood later contended that Alexander had "philosophical genius of very high order". Alexander influenced A. N. Whitehead, and mentored others who went on to become major figures in 20th-century British philosophy. One such was John Anderson.

In 1924 Alexander retired from his chair, and was succeeded by John Leofric Stocks.

== Awards and honours ==
He was given the Hon. LLD of St Andrews in 1905, and in later years he received Hon. Litt. D. degrees from Durham, Liverpool, Oxford and Cambridge.

In 1924, Alexander sat for the sculptor Jacob Epstein, who made two copies of a bust. One copy went to the Ben Uri Gallery & Museum, and the other to the University of Manchester. He was elected to membership of the Manchester Literary and Philosophical Society on 13 April 1926. He was Herbert Spencer lecturer at Oxford in 1927, and in 1930 the Order of Merit was conferred on him, the first to a native of Australia.

== Death and legacy ==
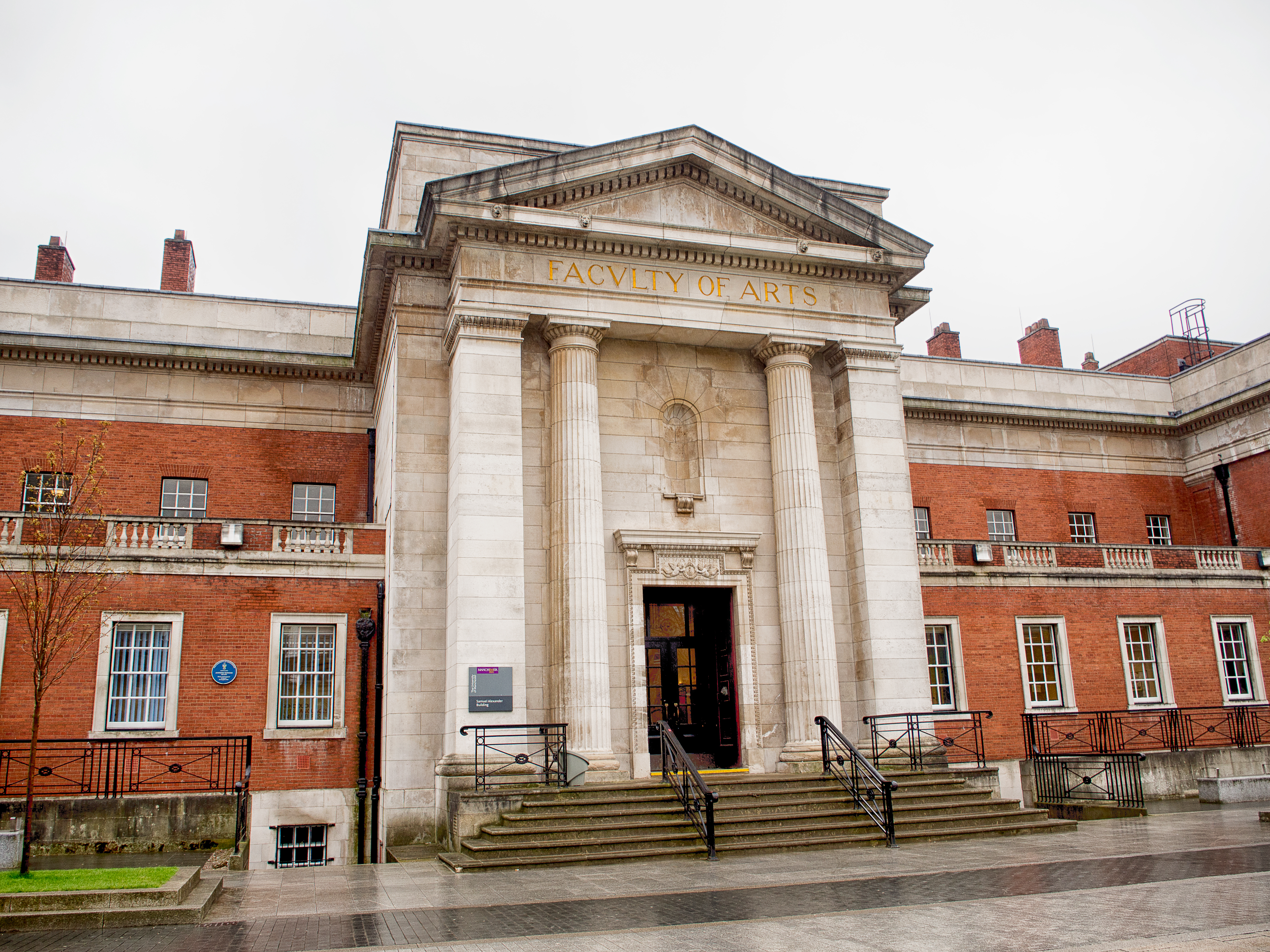
The Samuel Alexander Building at the University of Manchester

Alexander died on 13 September 1938. He was unmarried and his ashes lie in Manchester Southern cemetery (British Jewish Reform Congregation section). He left money to the University of Jerusalem and the University of Manchester. John Laird, his literary executor, edited Philosophical and Literary Pieces (1939). His papers were left to the John Rylands Library.

The building formerly known as Humanities Lime Grove at the University of Manchester was renamed the Samuel Alexander Building, in 2007. A theatre at Monash University, Melbourne, and a conference room at Wesley College, Melbourne are also named for him.

== Works ==
Alexander contributed articles on philosophical subjects to Mind, the Proceedings of the Aristotelian Society, and the International Journal of Ethics. In 1887, he won the Green moral philosophy prize with an essay on the subject "In what direction does Moral Philosophy seem to you to admit or require advance?" It was the basis of his volume Moral Order and Progress, which was published in 1889 and went into its third edition in 1899. Alexander credited A. C. Bradley with introducing him to ethics, and his brother F. H. Bradley helped him with the book. He was influenced by T. H. Green, in whose memory the prize had been set up, but diverged from his views in pursuing evolutionary ethics.

Alexander was appointed Gifford lecturer at Glasgow in 1915, and delivered his lectures in the winters of 1917 and 1918. They drew on preliminary papers he had written from 1908 onwards. These materials he developed into his major work Space, Time, and Deity, published in two volumes in 1920. John Laird called it "the boldest adventure in detailed speculative metaphysics attempted in so grand a manner by any English writer between 1655 and 1920". His Arthur Davis Memorial Lecture on Spinoza and Time, in the nature of an annexe to Space, Time, and Deity, was published in 1921.

In 1933, Alexander published Beauty and Other Forms of Value, mainly an essay in aesthetics. It incorporated passages from papers that had appeared in the previous ten years. Compared to his systematic work, it was rather closer to the mainstream of British thought, and was praised highly by R. G. Collingwood.

== Philosophical ideas ==
Two key concepts for Alexander are those of an "emergent quality" and the idea of emergent evolution:

As existents within Space-Time, minds enter into various relations of a perfectly general character with other things and with one another. These account for the familiar features of mental life: knowing, freedom, values and the like. In the hierarchy of qualities the next higher quality to the highest attained is deity. God is the whole universe engaged in process towards the emergence of this new quality, and religion is the sentiment in us that we are drawn towards him, and caught in the movement of the world to a higher level of existence.

— Space, Time and Deity [1920] Vol. II, p. 428

His idea was to start with space and time, each of which he regarded as inconceivable without the other, in fact mutually equivalent. His thinking, as he said, originated in Instinct and Experience (1912) by C. Lloyd Morgan; who went on in 1922 to give an exposition of emergent properties. Pure spacetime emerges, through a process Alexander describes simply as "motion", the stuff and matter that make up our material world:

Space-Time, the universe in its primordial form, is the stuff out of which all existents are made. It is Space-Time with the characters which we have found it to reveal to experience. But it has no 'quality' save that of being spatio-temporal or motion.

— Space, Time and Deity [1920] Vol. I, p. 342

Motion is not a succession of point-instants, but rather a point-instant is the limiting case of a motion.

— Space, Time and Deity [1920] Vol. I, p. 321

Point-instants are real but their separateness from one another is conceptual. They are in fact the elements of motion and in their reality are inseparable from the universe of motion; they are elements in a continuum.

— Space, Time and Deity [1920] Vol. I, p. 325

Time makes Space distinct and Space makes Time distinct... Space or Time, may be regarded as supplying the element of diversity to the element of identity supplied by the other.

— Space, Time and Deity [1920] Vol. I, p. 195

Alexander absolutizes spacetime, and even speaks of it as an "Entity|stuff" of which things are made. At the same time he also says that spacetime can be called "Motions" – not motion in the singular, but complexes of motions with kaleidoscopic changes within a continuum. In other words, for Alexander motion is primitive, and space and time are defined through relations between motions.

In Space, Time, and Deity Alexander held that an object may be before a consciousness, but is not in it; consciousness of an object is not the same as consciousness of one's consciousness of the object. For example, an object such as a chair may be apprehended by a consciousness, but the chair is not located within that consciousness; and, the contemplation of the chair is distinct from thinking about the act of contemplating the chair. Further, since the contemplation of an object is itself an action, in Alexander's view it cannot be "contemplated", but only subjectively experienced, or "enjoyed".

Alexander asked the question:

How far a science of order could be founded on this bare conception of ordered parts of Space-Time I do not know. But at any rate the more comprehensive theorems of speculative mathematics at the present time do not thus proceed. They appear to use the conception of Space and Time not as being stuffs, as we have taken them to be, within which there are relations of the parts of Space and Time themselves, but as relational in the sense that they are relations between things or entities. This is the antithesis between absolute and relational

— Space, Time and Deity [1920] Vol. I, p. 168

Alexander's views have been described as panentheistic.

== Family ==
A change in Alexander's home life occurred in 1902 when the whole of his family—his mother, an aunt, two elder brothers and his sister—came from Australia to live with him. His sister became his hostess and on Wednesday evenings there were informal social gatherings.

Alexander was an "unofficial godfather" to writer Naomi Mitchison née Haldane, born in 1897. He took an interest in her studies, and wrote her long letters. Mitchison devoted a chapter in her autobiographical work You May Well Ask to Alexander, recounting affectionate anecdotes and quoting extensively from his letters.

== Books ==
- Moral Order and Progress (1889)
- Locke (1908), a short study in the Philosophies Ancient and Modern Series.
- Space, Time, and Deity (1920), Macmillan & Co., reprinted 1966 by Dover Publications, reprinted 2004 by Kessinger Publications: "volume one" : ISBN 0-7661-8701-2 online version, "volume two" : ISBN 0-7661-8702-0
- Spinoza and Time (1921)
- Art and the Material (1925); Adamson Lecture for 1925
- Art and instinct (1927)
- Artistic creation and cosmic creation (1927)
- Beauty and Other Forms of Value (1933)
- Spinoza : an address delivered at the Liberal Jewish synagogue, London, on Sunday, March 13, 1927
- Spinoza : an address in commemoration of the tercentenary of Spinoza birth (1933)
- Philosophical and Literary Pieces (1939), (posthumous)
