= Edward Madden (botanist) =

Irish-born botanist

Lt Col Edward Madden FRSE (1805-1856) was an Irish-born botanist specialising in the mountain plants of the Himalayan passes.

== Life ==
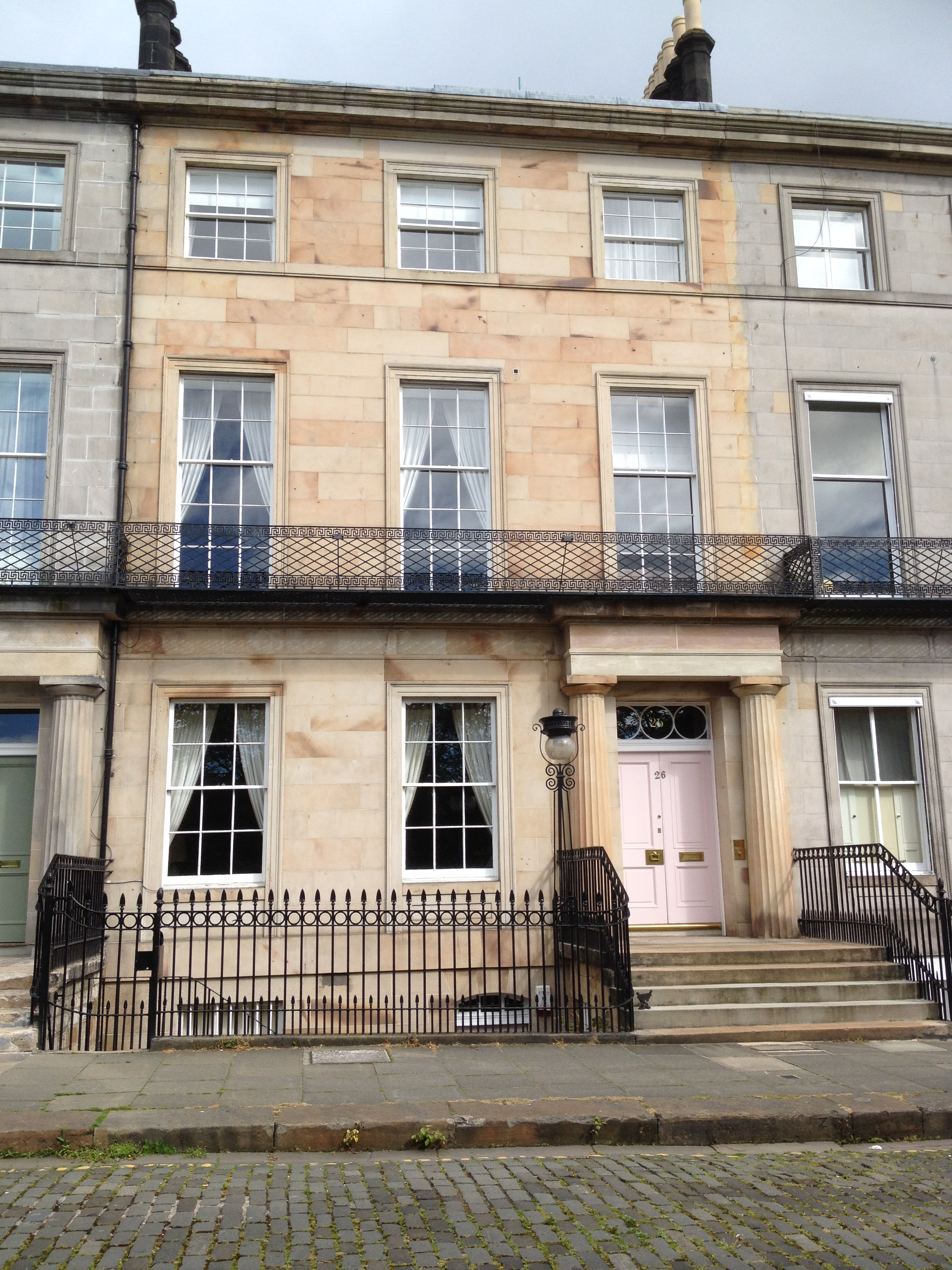
Madden's house at 26 Regent Terrace, Edinburgh

He was born in Ireland in 1805.

Trained as a soldier he joined the army attached to the artillery in the East India Company around 1820.

He travelled extensively in India in the 1820s and 1830s and believed he saw Biblical associations to the local flora. He did later tours in the company of Dr Hugh Falconer, basing themselves at Saharunpore. They also met and befriended the brothers Henry and Richard Strachey.

He retired to Edinburgh in 1849, living at 26 Regent Terrace, an elegant Georgian townhouse on Calton Hill.

In 1853 he was elected a Fellow of the Royal Society of Edinburgh, his proposer being John Fleming. He was also President of the Botanical Society of Edinburgh for 1855–56.

He died in Edinburgh in 1856.

== Family ==
He is known to have married as "Mrs Madden" continues to live at 26 Royal Terrace after his death.

== Publications ==
- On the Coniferae of the Himalaya
- On the Plants of the Turaee and Outer Mountains of the Kumaoon
