= Ann Katharine Mitchell =

British cryptanalyst and psychologist (1922–2020)

Ann Katharine Mitchell (née Williamson; 19 November 1922 – 11 May 2020) was a British cryptanalyst and psychologist who worked on decrypting messages encoded in the German Enigma cypher at Bletchley Park during the Second World War. After the war she became a marriage guidance counsellor, then studied for a Master of Philosophy at the University of Edinburgh. She worked at the university's Department of Social Administration and wrote several academic books about the psychological effects of divorce on children, including Someone to Turn to: Experiences of Help Before Divorce (1981) and Children in the Middle: Living Through Divorce (1985).

== Early life and education ==
Ann Williamson was born in Oxford on 19 November 1922, to Herbert Stansfield Williamson and Winifred Lilian Williamson (née Kenyon). Herbert had previously worked in the Indian Civil Service; Winifred had helped organise one of the first family planning clinics in Britain.

Mitchell gained a scholarship to Headington School, Oxford, from 1930 to 1939, before winning a place to study mathematics at Lady Margaret Hall, University of Oxford, between 1940 and 1943. At the time relatively few women went to Oxford and even fewer studied maths. There were only five women in her year at Oxford and she remarked that the men coming to university had been taught maths much better at school than the girls. Indeed, it was suggested to her by the headmistress of her school that studying maths was "unladylike"; her parents had to overrule her school to allow her to take up her place at Oxford.

== Career ==
=== Second World War ===
Mitchell was recruited to work at Bletchley Park in September 1943 after she graduated from Oxford, and until May 1945 she worked in Hut 6 on German Army and Air Force Enigma decryptions. She was recruited as a temporary worker with the Foreign and Commonwealth Office on an annual salary of £150 (increased to £200 after her 21st birthday). Much of her work involved converting 'cribs' into 'menus', the operating instructions for the Bombe decryption devices, to identify what that day's Enigma settings might be. The Germans changed their code every night at midnight, so Mitchell and the others had then to restart trying to crack the codes. Stuart Milner-Barry, the head of Hut 6, had difficulty recruiting enough men due to war demands and British civil service rules prevented men and women from working together on night shifts, so Mitchell worked solely with women in Hut 6. After the war, like others who worked at Bletchley, she was instructed to forget about her work there and never to talk about it. Once the work at Bletchley became public and the ban was lifted she gave many illustrated talks and interviews about her wartime role.

Her story is included in the book The Bletchley Girls: War, Secrecy, Love and Loss: The Women of Bletchley Park Tell Their Story (2015) by the historian Tessa Dunlop.

=== Academic and social policy work ===
In the 1950s Mitchell worked as a marriage guidance counsellor with the Scottish Marriage Guidance Council (now known as Relate Scotland). In the 1970s she returned to university to study social policy and in 1980, she graduated with a Master of Philosophy from the University of Edinburgh. In the early 1980s she was research associate at the Department of Social Administration at the University of Edinburgh.

Mitchell worked and published extensively on the subject of marriage breakup and divorce, and in particular on children's experience of family breakup. Her books include Someone to Turn To: Experiences of Help before Divorce (1981); When Parents Split Up (1982); Children in the Middle (1985); Coping with Separation and Divorce (1986); and Families (1987). They have been translated into a number of languages. Mitchell's work is referred to in several works on divorce in Scotland and further afield, (Note: Mitchell's studies are used in the following works: The Journal of the Law Society of Scotland. Edinburgh: The Law Society of Scotland. 1981. p. 262.; Maclean, Mavis (1991). Surviving Divorce: Women's Resources after Separation. Basingstoke, Hampshire: Macmillan. p. 20. ISBN 978-1-349-21341-2.; Mullan, Bob (1987). Are Mothers Really Necessary?. Boxtree Limited. pp. 59, 151. ISBN 978-1-85283-200-1.; Pryor, Jan; Rodgers, Bryan (10 October 2001). Children in Changing Families: Life After Parental Separation. Wiley. p. 114. ISBN 978-0-631-21576-9.; Richardson, C. James (1988). Divorce and family mediation research study in three Canadian cities: a report prepared for Department of Justice Canada. Fredericton, NB: J & J Research Associates. p. 33. ISBN 978-0-662-16122-6.; Velleman, J. David (2015). Beyond Price: Essays on Birth and Death. Cambridge, Cambridgeshire: Open Book Publishers. p. 65. ISBN 978-1-78374-167-0.) and was used as supporting evidence in two reports by the Scottish Law Commission, "Family Law: Report on Aliment and Financial Provision" (1981) and "Report on Reform of the Ground for Divorce" (1989). In 2014, in an article in the Scots Law Times, the family law barrister Janys Scott QC reviewed Mitchell's work on the workings of the Scottish divorce court. Scott concluded that "Mitchell has had a profound influence on family law in Scotland", and that her 1985 book Children in the Middle was "a seminal work" in the field.

=== Historical research ===
In her seventies Mitchell researched and wrote about the history of Edinburgh. She published two books, The People of Calton Hill (1993) and No More Corncraiks: Lord Moray's Feuars in Edinburgh's New Town (1998).

== Personal life ==
She married John Angus Macbeth Mitchell, known as Angus, on 13 December 1948; they had four children and lived in Edinburgh. He died on 26 February 2018, having retired as a senior civil servant in 1984, after which Ann and he worked for many years in the voluntary sector and academia. During his life in the army, civil service and in the voluntary sector, he was awarded Companion of the Bath, Commander of the Royal Victorian Order, the Military Cross, Knight of the Order of Orange-Nassau (Netherlands), and Chevalier of the Légion d'honneur (France) .

Mitchell died on 11 May 2020, aged 97, in Edinburgh. She tested positive for COVID-19 during the COVID-19 pandemic in Scotland shortly before her death.
