= Creation by Evolution =

1928 collection of essays

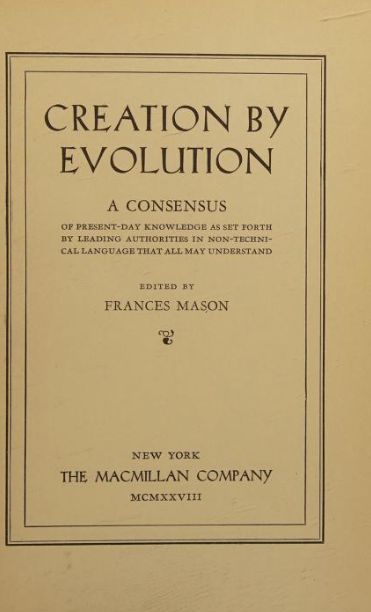
- Title page for Creation by Evolution (1928)
- Editor: Frances Mason
- Publisher: The Macmillan Company
- Publication date: 1928
- Text: Creation by Evolution at Wikisource

Creation by Evolution is a 1928 book edited by Frances Mason. Aimed at a general audience, the book is a collection of 24 essays supporting the theory of evolution. Among its contributors were Edward Wilber Berry, Edwin Grant Conklin, Samuel Jackson Holmes, Herbert Spencer Jennings, Richard Swann Lull, George Howard Parker, and William Berryman Scott.
