= List of Adamson Lectures =

The Adamson Lectures was a series of annual lectures held at the Victoria University of Manchester on the subject matter of logic and philosophy.

They were named in honour of Robert Adamson.

== Lectures ==
- 1907 — On the Light Thrown by Recent Investigations on Electricity on the Relation Between Matter and Ether (1908) by J. J. Thomson
- 1909 — English Poetry and German Philosophy in the Age of Wordsworth (1909) by A. C. Bradley
- 1910 — Leibniz as a Politician (1911) by Adolphus William Ward
- 1913 — The Distinction between Mind and Its Objects (1913) by Bernard Bosanquet
- 1920 — Satanism and the World Order (1920) by Gilbert Murray
- 1925 — Art and the Material (1925) by Samuel Alexander
- 1932 — John Locke (1632-1704) (1933) by Norman Kemp Smith
- 1933 — Carlyle and Hitler (1933) by Herbert John Clifford Grierson
- 1972 — The Waste Land (1972) by Helen Gardner
