= Duncan Menzies (architect) =

Scottish architect and civil engineer

Duncan Menzies (1837–1910) was a Scottish architect and civil engineer. His best known work is the Turnberry Hotel in Ayrshire. His grandest scheme is Murrayfield Avenue in west Edinburgh.

== Life ==
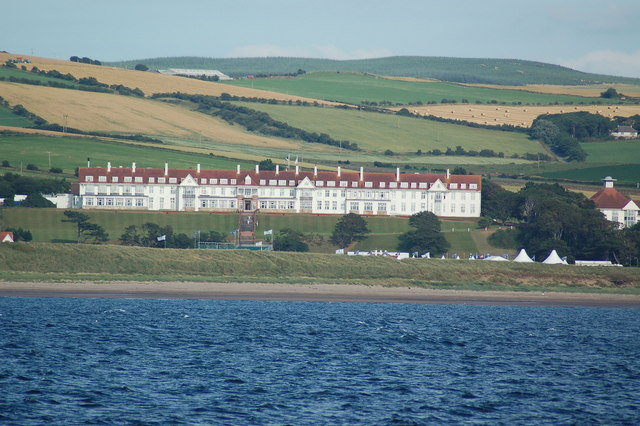
Turnberry Hotel

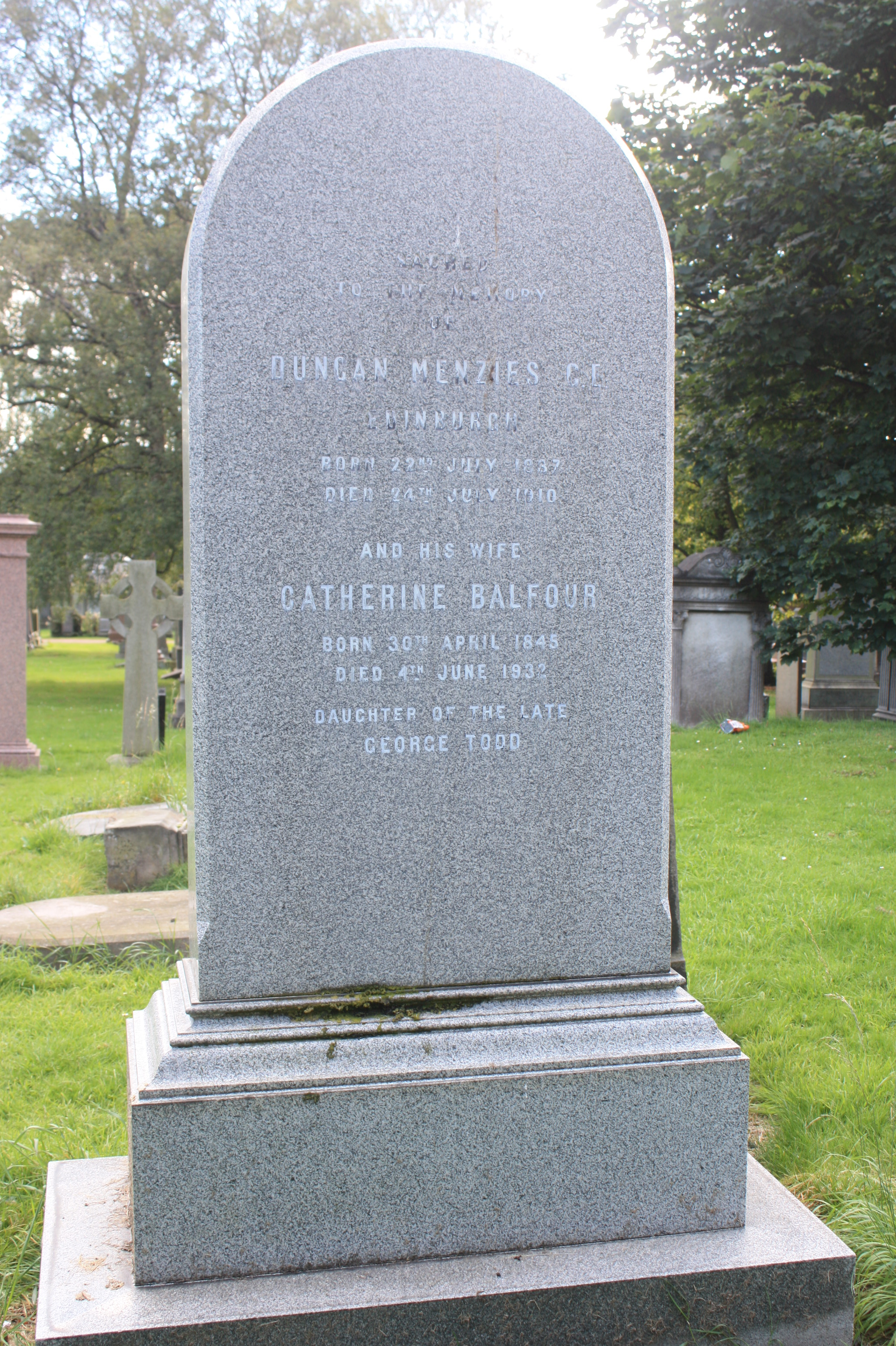
The grave of Duncan Menzies, Grange Cemetery, Edinburgh

He was born on 22 July 1837 the son of Duncan Menzies a spirit dealer at 28 Canal Street in southwest Edinburgh. Around 1852 he was articled to Robert Bell, an architect based at 25 St Patrick Square in Edinburgh's South Side and specialising in farm steadings. When Bell died in 1859 he succeeded to his practice, aged only 21. Changing the company to Bell & Menzies he relocated to 13 Young Street in the New Town, Edinburgh before merging with the more experienced James W. Stewart to create Stewart & Menzies. The firm moved to 39 York Place in 1878. The partnership ended in 1881. After a period of sole practice he joined with Alex W Cockburn around 1901 to create Menzies & Cockburn taking new premises at 33 York Place. At this time he lived in a substantial Georgian townhouse at 31 Regent Terrace on Calton Hill.

In late life he lived at 23 Upper Grove Place in south-west Edinburgh.

He died on 24 July 1910. He is buried south of the south-west section of Grange Cemetery in south Edinburgh. on the path that leads over the central vaults.

== Family ==
He married Catherine Balfour (née Todd) (1845–1932).

== Known works ==
- Stable courtyard, Inzievar House in Fife (1863)
- Cockburnspath School and Schoolhouse (1870)
- Buildings at East Pilton (probably Lauriston Farm) (1872)
- Easter Drylaw Cottages (possibly the Dalry Colonies) (1872)
- Forrest Hill drill hall (1872)
- Hallyards Farm (1872)
- North Gyle Cottages (1872)
- Gogar Mains Cottages (1878)
- Windsor Place United Presbyterian Church (1878)
- The Ship Hotel on The Shore, Leith (1888)
- Ticket centre for Waverley Station on the corner of Waverley Bridge and East Market Street (1889)
- A large stepped terrace of house at 2-60 Murrayfield Avenue (1889–1891)
- A much shorter terrace opposite the above, 1-9 Murrayfield Avenue (1893)
- Crichton Church, Cumnock (1897)
- Line of shops, Ayr Road, Cumnock (1897)
- Turnberry Hotel (1906)
- Terraced houses, 1-18 and 28-32 Mayfield Road (1910)
