= James MacGregor (minister) =

New Zealand presbyterian minister (1829–1894)

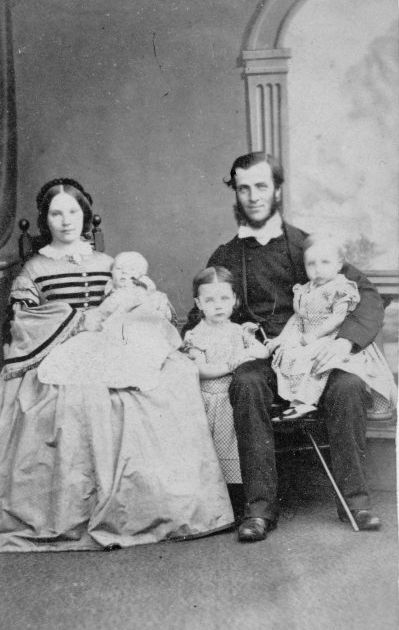
MacGregor with family in 1862

James Macnaughton MacGregor (6 January 1829 – 8 October 1894) was a Scottish and New Zealand Presbyterian minister and theologian. He was born in Callander, Perthshire, Scotland on 6 January 1829. (Callander is now in the Stirling council area.)

== Service in Scotland ==
After serving in Barry (1856–1861) and Paisley (1861–1868) as a minister in the Free Church of Scotland, he was elected and succeeded Professor James Buchanan as the Chair of Systematic Theology at New College, Edinburgh.

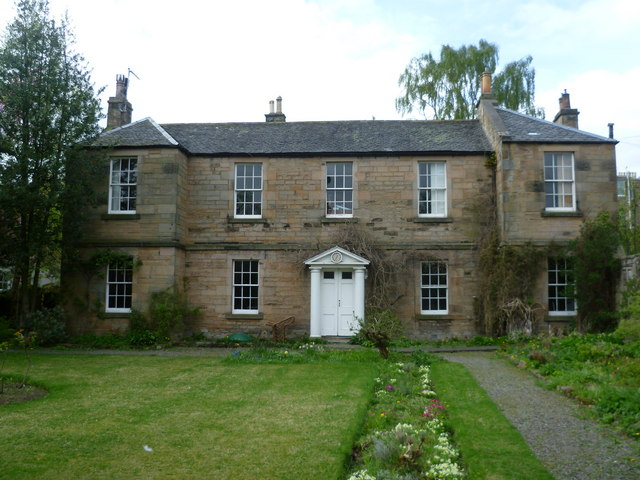
Their house at number 8, Eden Lane, Morningside; image from Geograph "House in Eden Lane by kim traynor"

== With family to New Zealand ==
In 1881, MacGregor and his family migrated to New Zealand after 13 years in that chair in Edinburgh. He carried on his ministry in Oamaru until he died there in 1894. A son, William Cunningham MacGregor (1862–1934), became solicitor-general in 1920.
