= Hugh Watt (disambiguation) =

Hugh Watt was interim Prime Minister of New Zealand in 1974.

Hugh Watt may also refer to:

- Hugh Watt (Canadian politician) (c. 1841–1914), physician and political figure in British Columbia
- Hugh Watt (British politician) (1848–1921), Scottish merchant and Member of the House of Commons
- Hugh Watt (moderator) (1879–1968), Scottish minister and historian

== See also ==
- Hugh Watts (1922–1993), English cricketer
- Watt (disambiguation)
- Hugh (disambiguation)
