= Hugh Martin (minister, born 1822) =

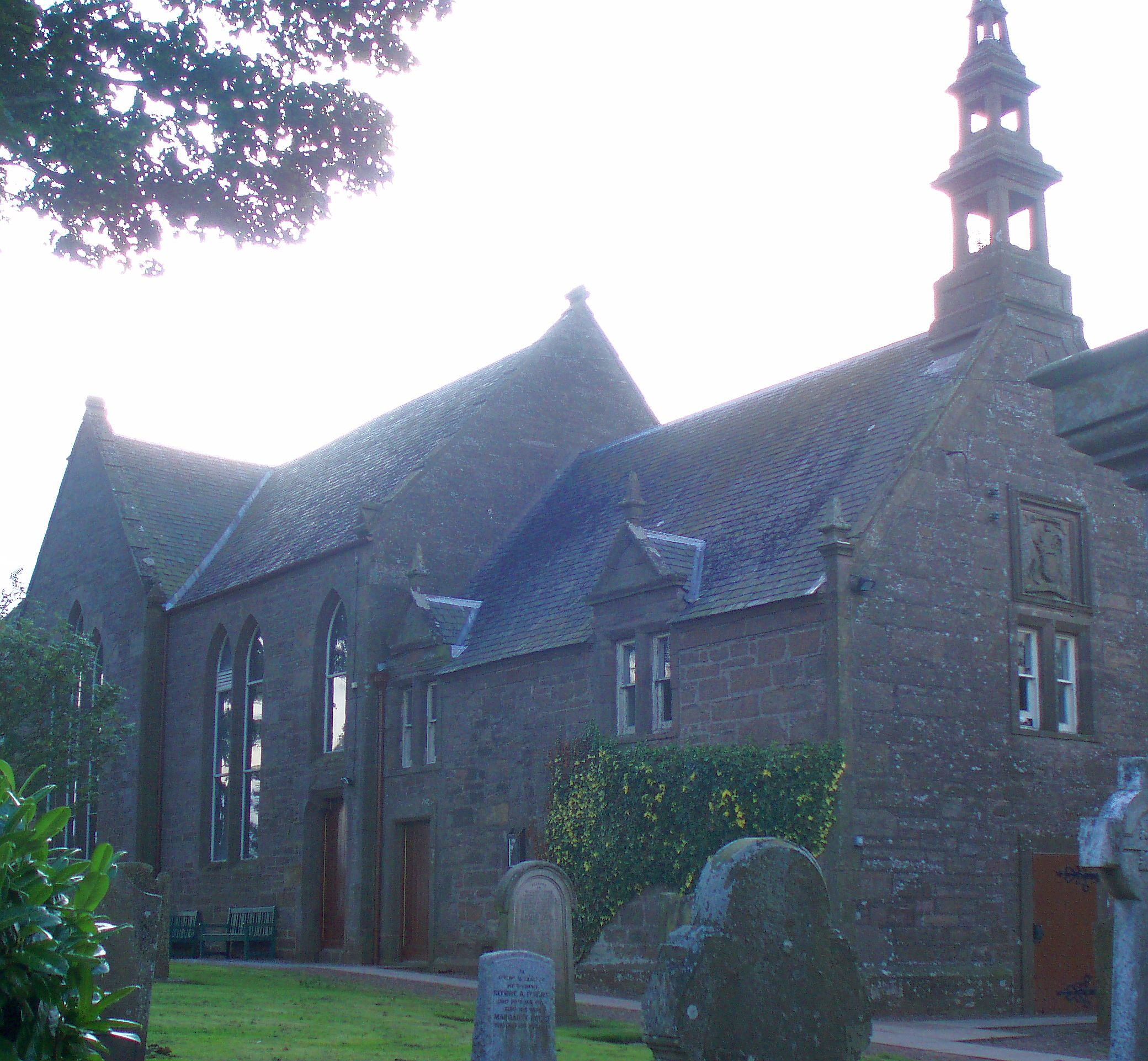
Panbride Kirk

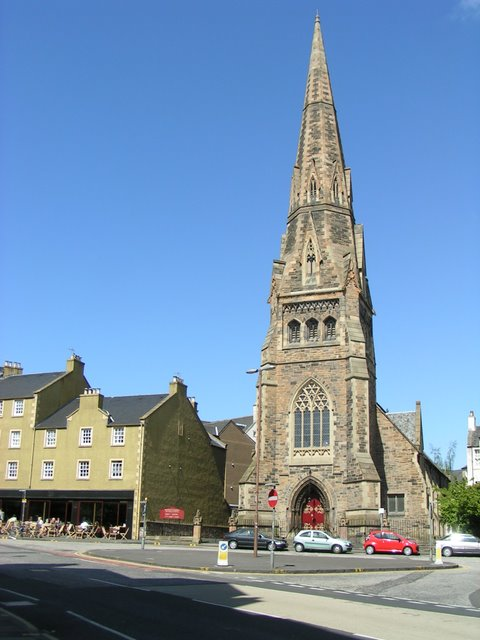
Buccleuch and Greyfriars Free Church of Scotland

Hugh Martin (11 August 1822 – 14 June 1885) was a Scottish minister of the Free Church of Scotland and a theological author.

== Life ==
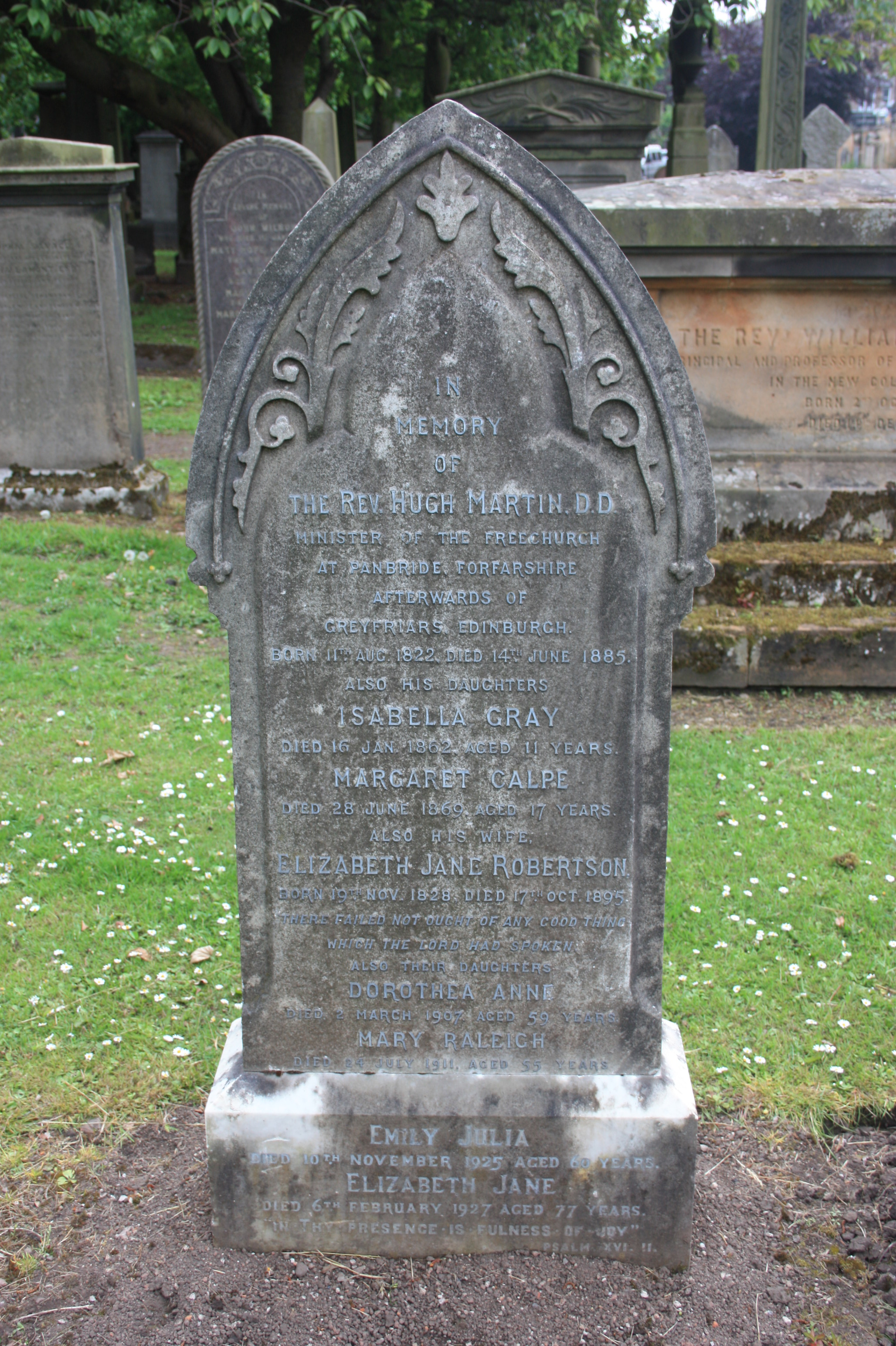
The grave of Rev Hugh Martin, Grange Cemetery

Born in Aberdeen on 11 August 1822, Hugh was the son of Alexander Martin, a clothier and haberdasher living at 79 Gallowgate. He studied at Aberdeen Grammar School then later took an arts degree at Marischal College, where he graduated with an MA in 1839. He then took a second degree in theology at King's College, Aberdeen.

In 1842, Hugh was converted to the principles of the Free Church of Scotland by Rev Dr William Cunningham, who became his life-long mentor. In the Disruption of 1843, he joined the Free Church faction and was one of the first ministers ordained directly into that faction without transfer from the Church of Scotland. Licensed to preach by the Free Church in 1843, he was thereafter ordained as a minister of Panbride near Carnoustie.

In 1858, he left Panbride to take on the role as minister of Greyfriars Free Church in Edinburgh (on West Crosscauseway), one of the Free Church's newly built and more impressive city monuments. He lived in a villa on Findhorn Place.

He retired to Lasswade, south of Edinburgh in 1865 due to ill-health. He, however, continued to lecture at the University of Edinburgh and was later awarded an honorary doctorate DD by the university in 1872. In his retiral, he spent much effort in campaigning for free education for all children in Scotland, and was one of the non-political forces who brought about the 1872 Education Act in Scotland.

He died in Lasswade on 14 June 1885. He is buried with his family in Grange Cemetery in south Edinburgh. The grave lies in the north-west section.

== Publications ==
- Christ's Presence in the Gospel History (1860)
- The Prophet Jonah (1866)
- A Study of Trilinear Co-ordinates (1867) - mathematics
- Simon Peter (1869)
- The Atonement (1870)
- National Education 8 volumes (1872)
- Mutual Eligibility 8 volumes (1872)
- Relationships Between Christ's Headship over Church and State (1875)
- The Shadow of Calvary 8 volumes (1875)
- The Westminster Doctrine of the Inspiration of Scripture 8 volumes (1877)

== Family ==
He was married to Elizabeth Jane Robertson (1828–1895). Six daughters are recorded on his gravestone and his son Alexander was the Principal of New College, Edinburgh 1918–1935, as well as one of the architects of the union of the United Free Church of Scotland and Church of Scotland in 1929.
