= James Mackey (theologian) =

Catholic theologian (1934–2020)

- Born: 9 February 1934; Dungarven
- Died: 25 January 2020 (aged 85); Waterford

Education
- Education: National University of Ireland; Pontifical University of Maynooth; Queen's University, Belfast

Philosophical work
- Institutions: New College, Edinburgh; University of Edinburgh; Queen's University Belfast; St John's College seminary University of San Francisco; Trinity College, Dublin
- Doctoral students: Heather Widdows

James P. Mackey was a liberal Catholic theologian who held the Thomas Chalmers chair of theology at the University of Edinburgh from 1979 until his retiral in 1999.

== Early life, education and career ==
James Patrick Mackey was born in County Waterford, Ireland on 9 February 1934, the eldest child of Peter Mackey and Esther Morrissey. He attended the Christian Brothers School in his home town of Dungarvan before completing his secondary education at the Cistercian College in Roscrea. He studied as an undergraduate at the National University of Ireland where he received his Bachelor of Arts degree with first class honours, before continuing his studies at St Patrick's College, Maynooth where he received his Licentiate in Philosophy, Bachelor of Divinity, Licentiate of Sacred Theology and Doctor of Divinity degrees.

On completing his doctorate in divinity in 1960 he moved to Belfast to lecture in Theology at Queen's University Belfast. While working at Queen's he also completed a PhD in Philosophy under the supervision of Professor James Haire, his thesis being on the nature of evil as understood in modern philosophy and theology. He moved back to Waterford in 1966 to teach at St John's seminary and went on to work as Professor of Systematic and Philosophical Theology at the University of San Francisco from 1973 to 1979.

== Appointment to the University of Edinburgh ==
For much of the 20th century, the Faculty of Divinity of the University of Edinburgh, situated at New College on The Mound was primarily considered to be a seminary for the training of ministers in the Church of Scotland. The Chair of Christian Dogmatics, held by Thomas Torrance since the merging of New College and the Faculty of Divinity in 1952, was due to become vacant on his retiral in September 1979 and had been renamed the Thomas Chalmers Chair of Theology in honour of the liberal theologian and first moderator of the Free Church of Scotland. The post was advertised and applicants considered by a nominating committee made up of six representatives each from the university and Church of Scotland.

The committee recommended Mackey for the position to the University Court in May 1979, a move that was met with some acrimony. A motion was tabled at the General Assembly of the Church of Scotland, led by former moderator the Very Reverend John R. Gray and signed by 33 commissioners of the Assembly, expressing "grave disquiet" at the possibility of the appointment of a Roman Catholic to the role. Some Church leaders threatened to withdraw candidates for the Church of Scotland ministry from New College, and Gray stated that presbyterian students could not in conscience attend the lectures of a Catholic

Nevertheless, the appointment was confirmed. At his inaugural lecture in October 1979, Mackey assured his detractors that they had nothing to fear and treated the situation with humour, joking that he "could have gone down in history as perhaps the only man to be dismissed from a Chair three days before he was appointed to it". At the accompanying press conference, the Very Reverend Dr Andrew Ross, Dean of the Faculty of Divinity and Principle of New College, was strongly critical of Gray, stating Gray believed education to be brainwashing, adding "We do not brainwash anyone here. We teach them to think for themselves."

Mackey went on to serve as Dean of the Faculty of Divinity from 1984 to 1988 and retired from the university in 1999.

== Bibliography ==
- Jesus the Man and the Myth: A Contemporary Christology. London: SCM Press. 1979. ISBN 978-1859310250.
- The Christian Experience of God as Trinity. London: SCM Canterbury Press. 1983. ISBN 978-0334019374.
- Religious Imagination. Edinburgh: Edinburgh University Press. 1986. ISBN 978-0852245125.
- Modern Theology: A Sense of Direction. Oxford: Oxford University Press. 1987. ISBN 978-0192192202.
- An Introduction to Celtic Christianity. Edinburgh: T&T Clark Ltd. 1989. ISBN 978-0567095077.
- Power and Christian Ethics. Cambridge: Cambridge University Press. 1994. ISBN 978-0521426114.
- The Critique of Theological Reason. Cambridge: Cambridge University Press. 2000. ISBN 978-0521169233.
- Christianity and Creation: The Essence Of The Christian Faith And Its Future Among Religions. Continuum. 2007. ISBN 978-0826419071.
