= Elizabeth Templeton =

Elizabeth Anne Templeton
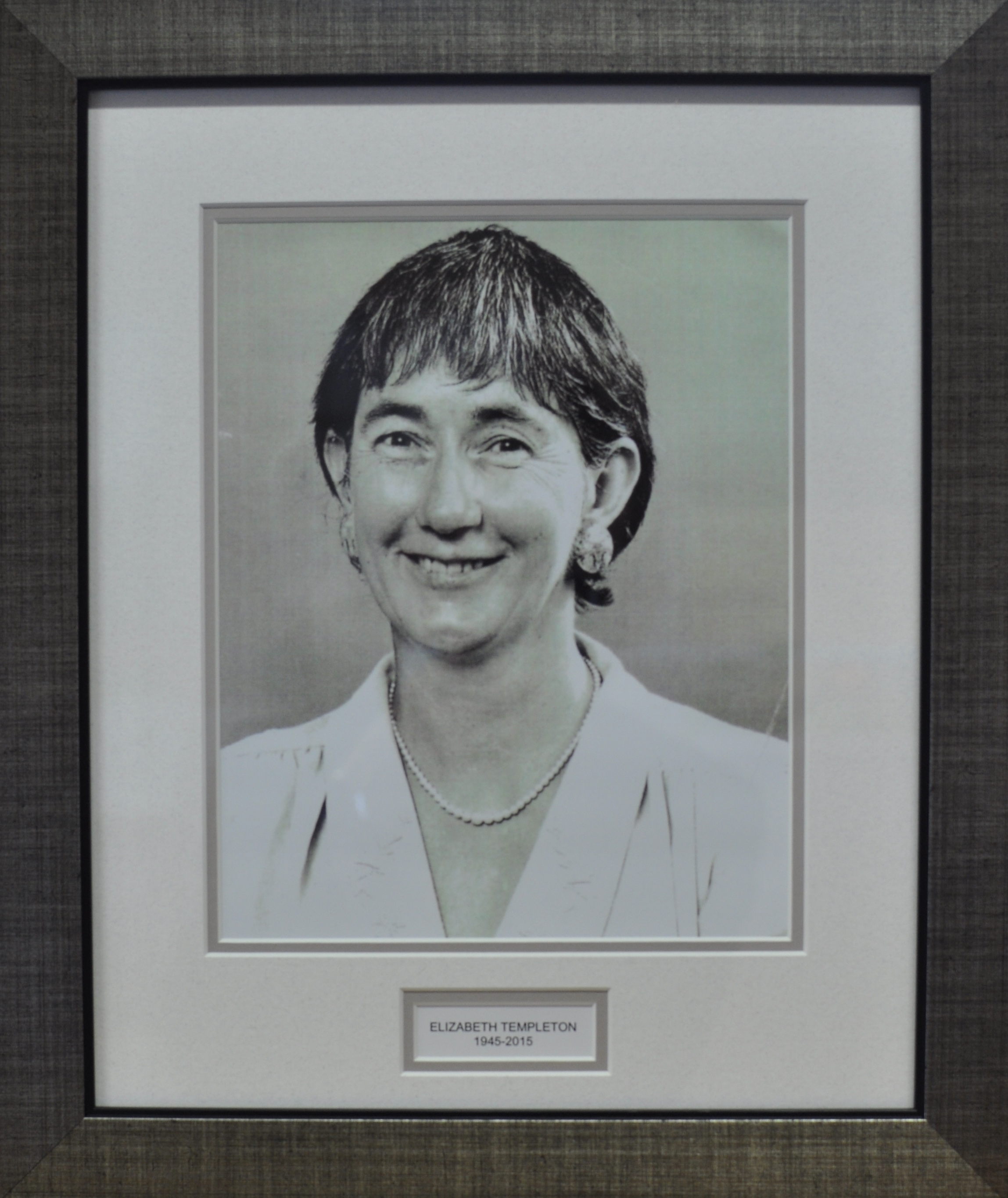
- Born: 8 June 1945; Drumoyne, Glasgow, Scotland
- Died: 11 April 2015 (aged 69)
- Known for: Theologian and Educator

Elizabeth Anne Templeton (8 June 1945 – 11 April 2015) was a Scottish freelance theologian and educationalist.

== Early life and education ==
Templeton was born 8 June 1945 in Drumoyne in Glasgow. Her father was a clerk, who became a teacher and was a conscientious objector and mother a primary school teacher in Govan.

She first studied Philosophy and English literature at Glasgow University before moving to Edinburgh to study theology at New College. The latter studies had a significant impact on her thinking and she was a logical positivist and radical theologian.

In 1970 she was appointed as Lecturer in the Philosophy of Religion and was the first woman to hold a full-time lecturer post in the Faculty of Divinity, New College.

== Career and legacy ==
Templeton was committed to providing education, not for theologians, but for ordinary everyday people and after 10 year of teaching theology at New College in Edinburgh, opened a centre where people could talk about everyday problems in relation to theology. She supported the idea that education was a relational process between teacher and student and it was essential to recognise a diversity of values, ideas and cultural backgrounds. She argued that the purpose of religious education was to enable dialogue between communities. Acknowledging the plurality of faiths enabled learners to be sensitive and empathise with a faith community.

In September 2016, one of the lecture halls in New College was renamed in her honor.

== Family ==
In 1977 she married Douglas Templeton, who lectured in New Testament, and in 1980 she left her academic post to bring up their young family.
