= Ruth Page (theologian) =

Theologian

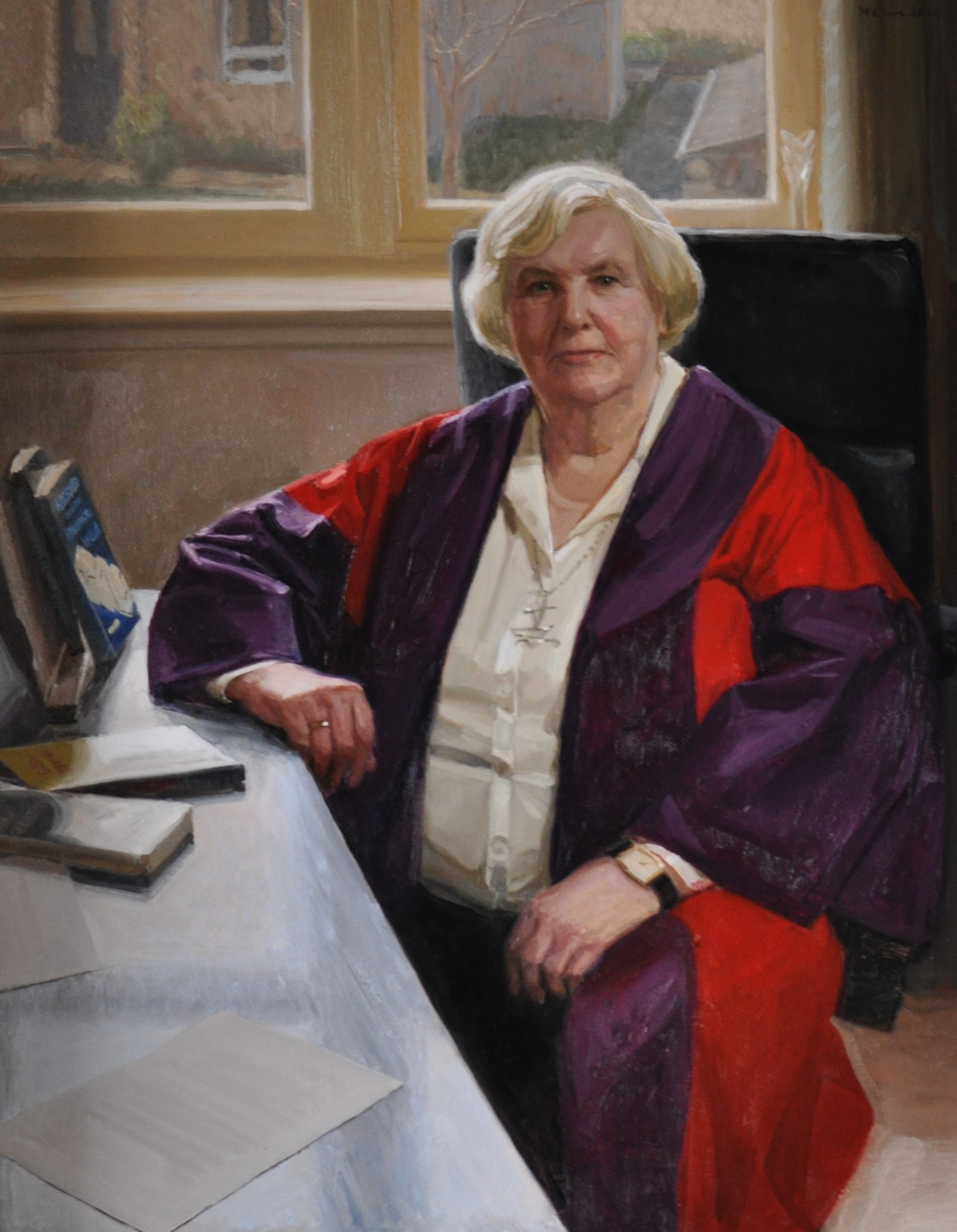
- Portrait hung in the Senate Room of New College, Edinburgh
- Born: 15 September 1935; Dundee, Scotland
- Died: 22 September 2015 (aged 80); Colinton, Scotland
- Known for: first woman principal of New College, Edinburgh

Academic background
- Education: Harris Academy; Stirling High School; University of St Andrews; University of Otago; University of Oxford

Ruth Page (15 September 1935 – 22 September 2015) was the first female principal of New College, Edinburgh (1996–99). She had been teaching in New College since 1979, until her retirement in 2000.

Her prominent work includes God and the Web of Creation (1996) and Ambiguity and the Presence of God (1985).

== Biography ==
Born in Dundee, she educated at Harris Academy and Stirling High School. She obtained her BA of English and French with honours at University of St Andrews in 1956, and then taught in Tauranga in New Zealand from 1957 to 1968, before she studied for the ministry at University of Otago, obtaining a BD in 1971, and a DPhil at the University of Oxford in 1975. That year, she was ordained by the Presbytery of Dunedin and started her academic career as a lecturer at the Theological Hall in University of Otago. In 1979, she would return to Scotland to become a lecturer in the Faculty of Divinity at New College, Edinburgh and become a minister of the Church of Scotland. She became the principal of New College in 1996, and worked until her retirement in 2000.

== Theology in the God and the Web of Creation ==
In light of ecological crisis caused by humanity, Page suggests that the problems should be viewed from a Christian perspective to care about the natural world. This concerns God's relationship with the natural world, for how the divine involves in all creatures, influenced by Celtic spirituality that highlights God's engagement with all living, farming and fishing. For Page, a doctrine of creation should be about how God is involved in, and not only about human's action. Humans are considered as the web of likenesses, because humans are in a pattern of interconnection, with both humans and non-humans. Emphasising the importance of the doctrine of creation, Page urges Christians to re-think the relationship between God, humanity and all the natural world. Thus, with God's immanent action with the world, both human and non-human can be gathered like a web of creation.

== Writings ==
- Ambiguity and the Presence of God (1985). London: SCM Press. ISBN 033400022X.
- God and the Web of Creation (1996). London: SCM Press. ISBN 0334026539.
- God with Us: Synergy in the Church (2011). London: SCM Press. ISBN 0334027969.
- The Incarnation of Freedom and Love (2012). London: SCM Press. ISBN 0334024900.
