= Alexander Thomson of Banchory =

Scottish advocate, agriculturalist, antiquary, author, philanthropist and traveller

Alexander Thomson
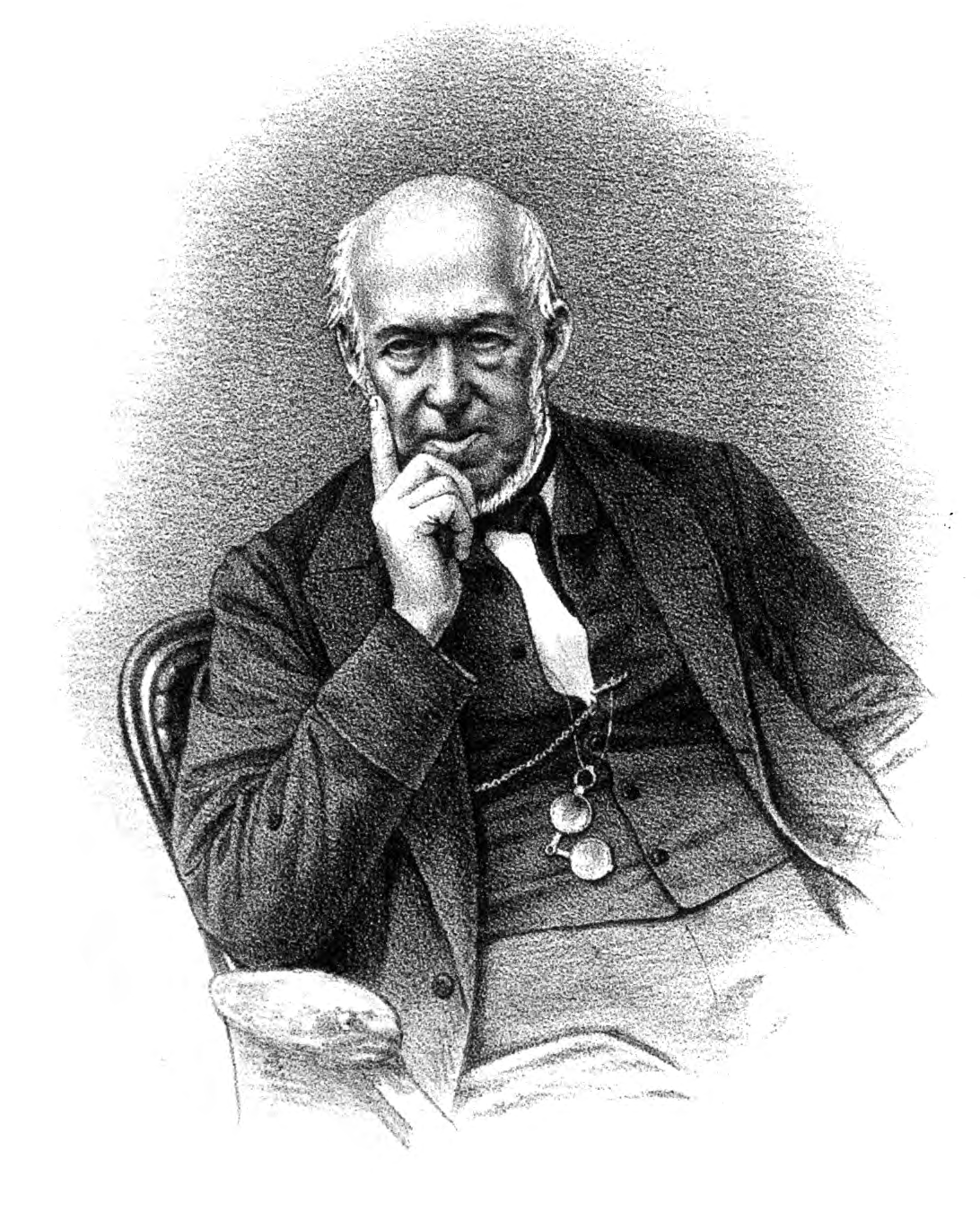
- Alexander Thomson of Banchory from Memoir

Personal details
- Born: 21 June 1798
- Died: 20 May 1868 (aged 69)

Dean of Faculty of Law

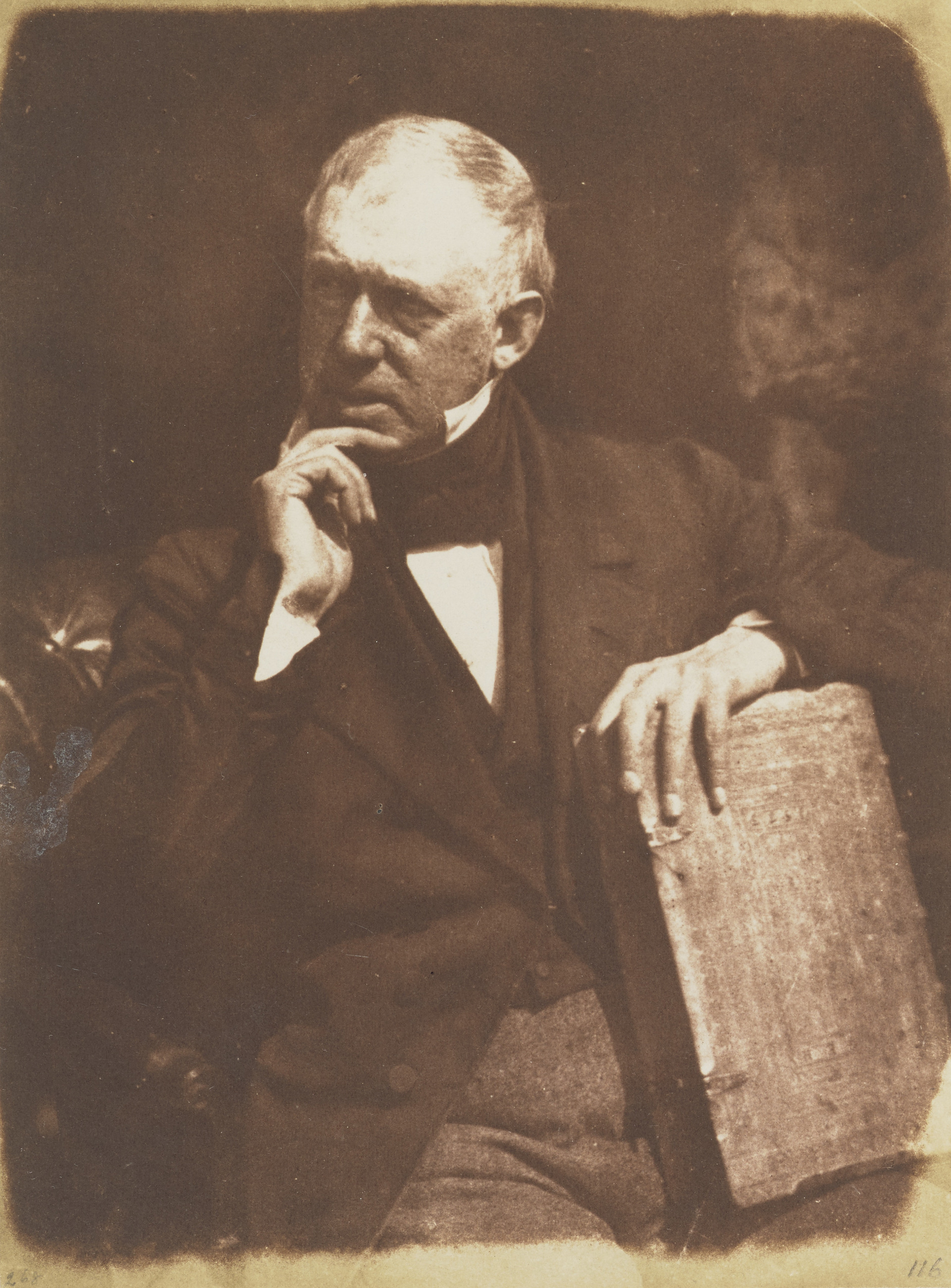
Alexander Thomson of Banchory with book by Hill & Adamson

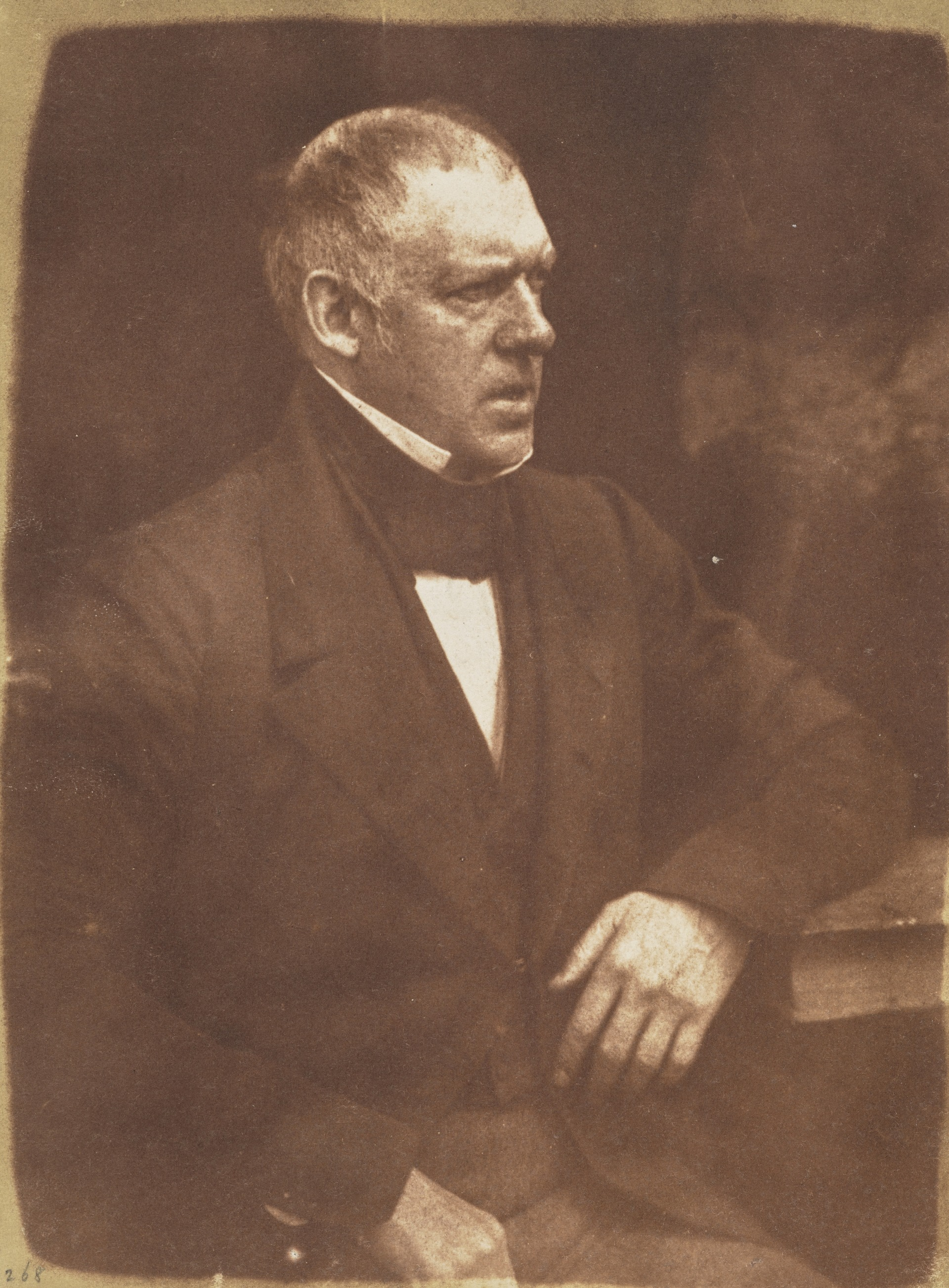
Alexander Thomson of Banchory from National Galleries Scotland

Alexander Thomson of Banchory FRSE (1798–1868) was a 19th-century Scottish advocate, agriculturalist, antiquary, author, philanthropist and traveller. He owned an estate at Banchory-Devenick in Aberdeenshire. After qualifying as an advocate in Edinburgh he returned to the estate and did not pursue a career at the bar preferring to follow the life of a country gentleman. He travelled extensively in Europe, spending many years studying overseas. He settled crofters on his estate and planted many trees. His position in life allowed to give time to many interests including antiquarian studies, geology, biology and social reform. He attempted to unite Marischal and King's Colleges in Aberdeen University. At the Disruption he sided with the Free Church and was a prominent leader in that cause. He died in 1868 and bequeathed a sizeable museum and collection of books to the church. He also gave a substantial amount of money to set up a Free Church College in Aberdeen.

== Early life and education ==
He was born on 21 June 1798, the son of Andrew Thomson of Banchory, and his wife, Helen Hamilton. Thomson's mother Helen, was a daughter of Dr. Robert Hamilton, Professor of Natural Philosophy in Marischal College. His father, Andrew, died in 1806, aged thirty-two years, and was succeeded by his son, Alexander, a boy of eight years. Alexander was educated at the Grammar School of Aberdeen, and Marischal College, and graduated in arts in 1816. He then proceeded to Edinburgh, and studied for the Scottish Bar. He joined the Speculative Society, and took a share in the debates. He passed Advocate in 1820, but never practised at the bar. Besides his legal and cognate studies, Mr Thomson, whilst in Edinburgh, began the study of Italian. To the close of his life he retained a fondness for that language and for Italian literature. He also formed friendships which were lasting, with, among others of note, Alexander Dunlop, Sir William Hamilton, and John Hamilton. On attaining majority, Mr Thomson was appointed a Deputy-Lieutenant for Aberdeenshire and Kincardineshire; he was elected Dean of Marischal College; and he began to devote attention to the improvement of his estates, and to county business. He erected a mansion house of Banchory on the site of the old one. The house stands on a fine elevated position, and is a large and commodious structure, with the front and entrance towards the south. The gardens are large, and enclosed with very high walls. There are two approaches to the house — one on the east and the other on the west — and the pleasure grounds are extensive. In 1823 he was elected a Fellow of the Royal Society of Edinburgh. His proposer was Sir William Hamilton, 9th Baronet.

== Marriage and grand tour ==
From 1818 to 1863 he travelled extensively in Europe and kept a diary of his travels. In 1825 Mr Thomson was married to Jessy, daughter of Alexander Fraser, Esq., an ex-Lord Provost of Aberdeen. The following year Mr and Mrs Thomson visited Holland, Germany, Switzerland, and Italy. During the journey, Mr Thomson made copious notes of his observations on the state of education in these countries, and their social and moral condition. They spent about three years in Florence, Rome, and Naples, Antiquities, the geology and vegetation of the country, and more particularly its social and religious state, engaged his attention; and he carefully studied the doctrines and practices of Roman Catholicism. Mr and Mrs Thomson returned to Banchory in 1829.

== Activities at home ==
In 1826 he returned to Aberdeen as Dean of the Faculty of Law. Resuming his public duties and literary and scientific pursuits, Mr Thomson shewed a deepened seriousness and increased interest in religious objects. He withdrew from attendance on the ministrations of the parish clergyman, a Moderate, and attended the Evangelical preaching of ministers in Aberdeen such as Alexander Dyce Davidson. In 1833 Mr Thomson spent a few months in Edinburgh, and having heard the discussions about patronage, as a Conservative, his fears were aroused "lest anything rash should be done." He came within the influence of the Church Extension movement, became an enthusiastic supporter, and on his return home, got an auxiliary society formed in Aberdeen, and secured the erection of a church in a destitute part of his own district. In 1834 he published "Facts from Rome; " and contributed a sketch of Dr Hamilton to the Encyclopoedia Britannica. In 1835 he visited Belgium; and brought before the Highland Society the plan followed in that country for reclaiming waste land, and for cultivating flax and chicory. He originated schemes for organising a county police force, and for improving prison discipline. He is reported to have planted over a million trees in less than two decades.

== The ten years' conflict ==
During the first half of the ten years' conflict Mr Thomson took no share in the discussions and deliberations which engrossed some of the Church of Scotland. In December 1839 his friend, John Hamilton, advocate, sent to him his pamphlet, " Our Present Position; " and from the time he perused that pamphlet Mr Thomson became deeply interested in the question. As a leading Aberdeenshire Conservative, and an intimate friend of Lord Aberdeen, Mr Thomson was the medium of conveying to his lordship a copy of that publication, and of others issued by the Evangelical party in the Church. He also corresponded frankly with Lord Aberdeen on the question.

== At the Disruption ==
In the Disruption of 1843, Mr. Thomson took an active part, and spent time and means in promoting the cause of the Free Church. Thomas Chalmers visited Thomson at Banchory House in September, 1843 and on 10 September, Chalmers preached on the lawn to a great assemblage. In the General Assembly of the Free Church of 1844, Mr. Thomson proposed a scheme for providing manses to the ministers; and the institution of a Theological Hall in Aberdeen was warmly supported by him.

== Other pursuits ==
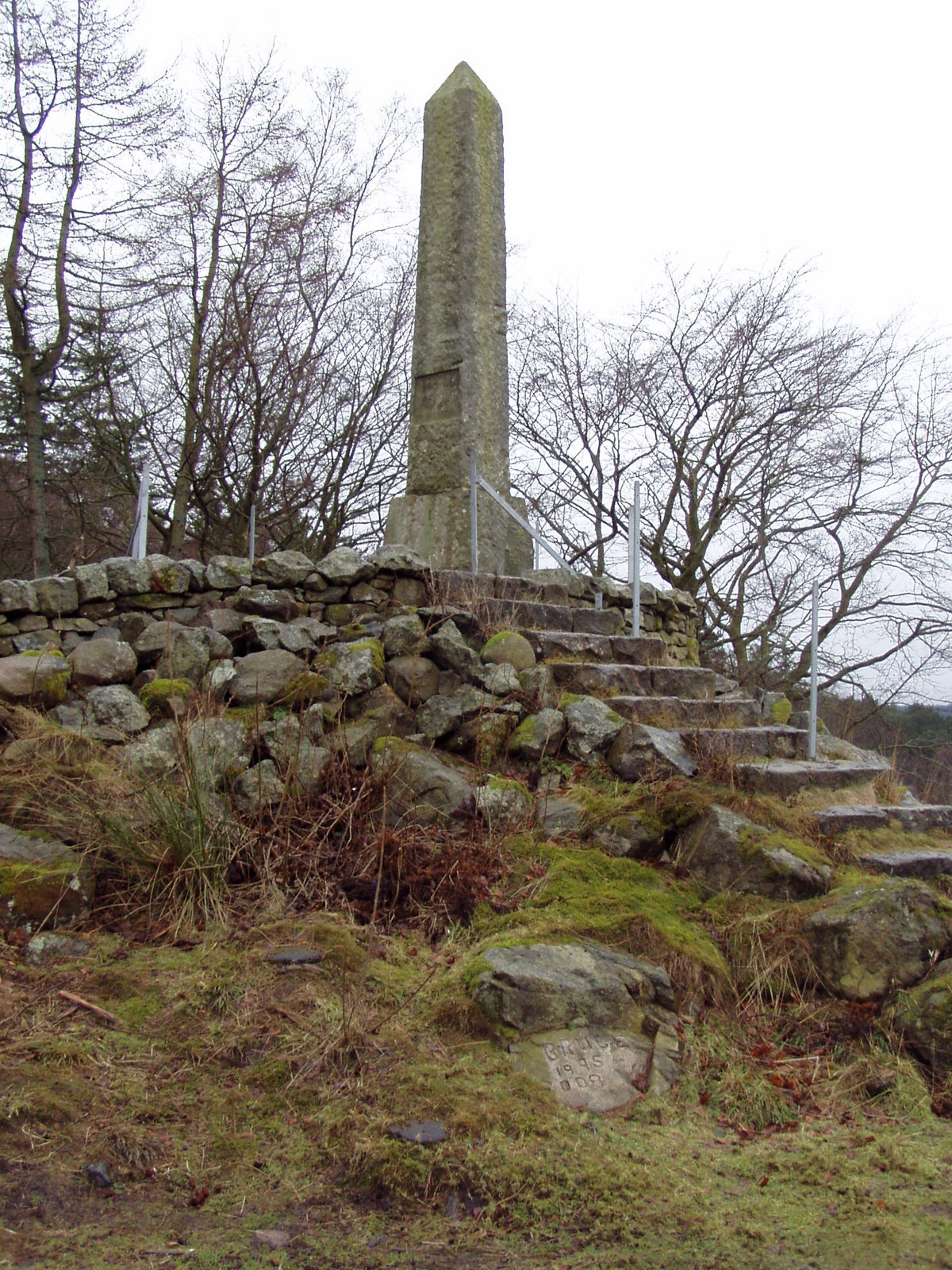
Obelisk in Tollohill Wood

In 1852 Thomson published Social Evils: Their Causes and Their Cure. In 1855 Aberdeen University awarded him an honorary doctorate (LLD). He occasionally directed his attention to antiquarian and geological subjects, and also inquiries touching the social condition of the people. He had co-operated with Sheriff Watson in planting in Aberdeen the first "Ragged School" attempted in Scotland; and he continued to help the Sheriff in extending the experiment. In 1859, when Albert, Prince Consort presided at the meeting of the British Association held at Aberdeen, Thomson entertained the Prince at Banchory House. In commemoration of this event, he erected a granite obelisk on the Cotcraig Rock at Tollo Hill. Though his health began to fail, he still continued to pursue the subjects which interested him, and published a number of pamphlets on antiquarian and scientific subjects.

== Death and legacy ==
He died on the 20 May 1868, at the age of seventy years. Under his trust settlement he bequeathed to the Free Church College of Aberdeen, £16,000, and also the very valuable Library and Museum which he had collected at Banchory House. He was the founder of the Thomson Science Lectureship in the College.

He bequeathed over 1600 books and 6000 pamphlets to the Free Church College in Aberdeen. These are now held by Aberdeen University.

His memoirs were collected and published by Rev George Smeaton in 1869.

== John Knox's watch ==
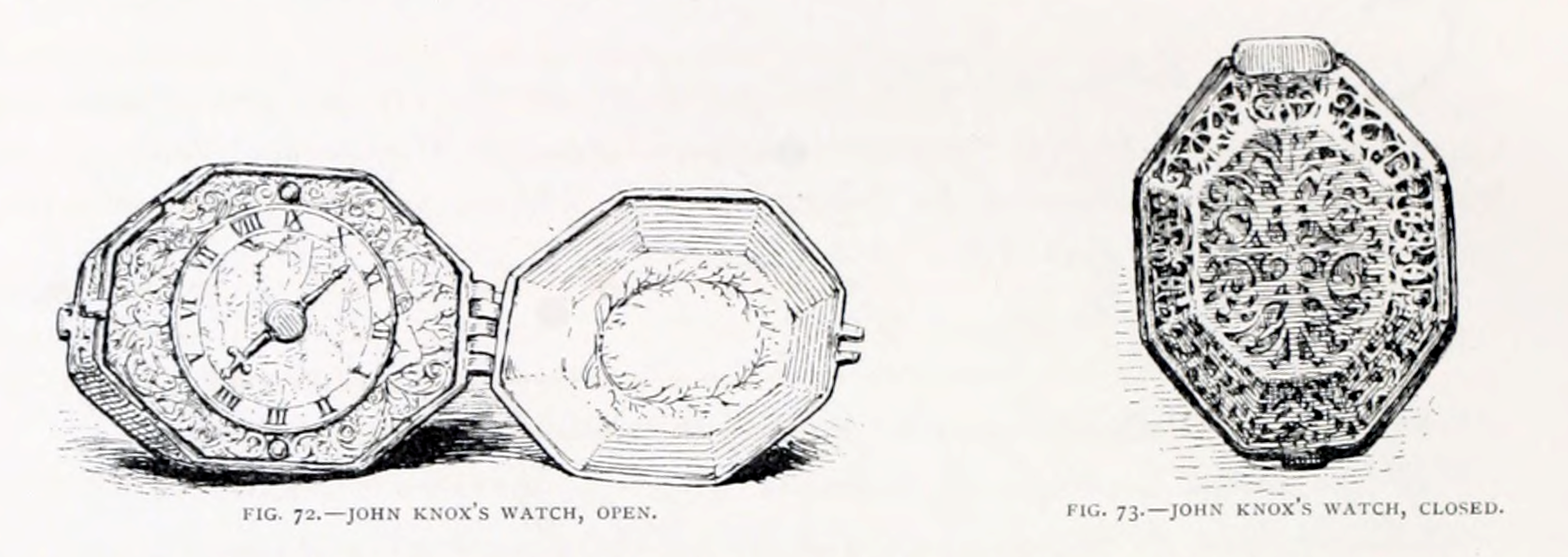
John Knox's watch

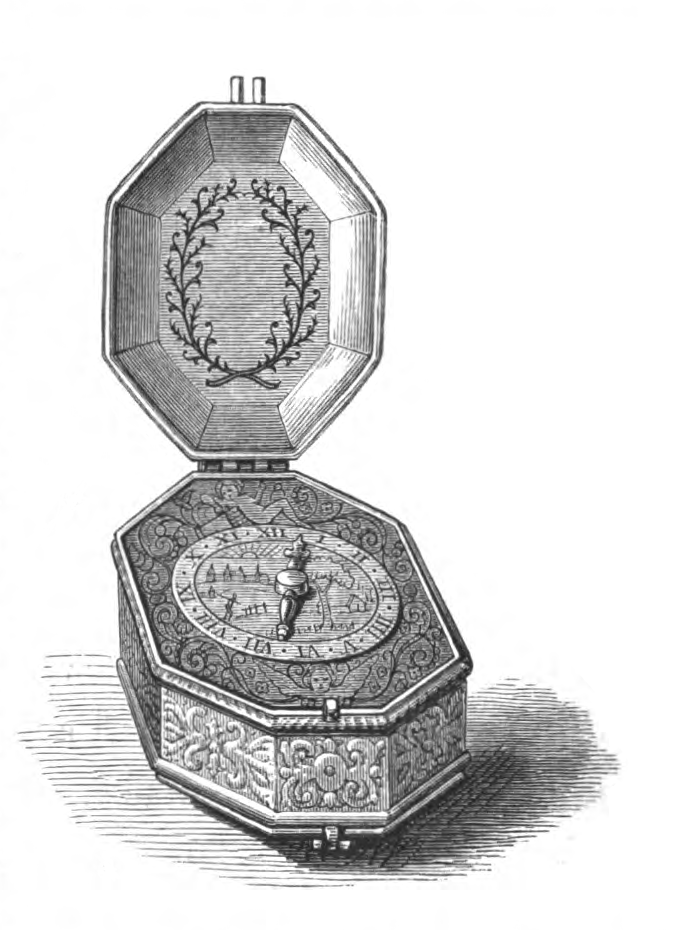
John Knox's watch from Memoir

In the museum of Free Church College, Aberdeen there is deposited an antique watch which Mr Thomson possessed as an heirloom from his ancestor: John Knox. Thomson wrote: "The unvarying tradition is that the watch was the property of the great Reformer, and, further, that it was presented to him by Queen Mary on some occasion when she wished to show favour to him, and that it has even since been preserved as an heirloom in the family. In those days watches were rare, and such an one was no unsuitable gift even from Royalty."

The familial connection with Knox is given in Murdoch-Lawrance:

Alexander Thomson was born 21 June 1798, at Banchory House, near Aberdeen. The family from which he sprang traced its descent from John Knox, the Scottish Reformer. John Knox left three daughters, one of whom was married to Mr George Baillie, of the Jerviswoode family, and by him had a daughter, Elizabeth (Grissel) (died 1697) who was married to James Kirkton, of Edinburgh. By the latter marriage there was a daughter, Margaret, who was married to Dr Andrew Skene, of Aberdeen. Dr Skene left several children, the eldest of whom, Dr Andrew Skene, had by his wife, Margaret Lumsden, daughter of Lumsden of Cushnie, three sons and four daughters. One of the daughters — Mary — married in 1769 Andrew Thomson of Banchory, who had issue by her — Margaret, Andrew, and Alexander. Andrew Thomson married Helen Hamilton, daughter of Dr Robert Hamilton, of Marischal College, Aberdeen and by her had a son Alexander. At an early age Alexander was sent to the Aberdeen Grammar School. From the Grammar School he proceeded to Marischal College, where his grandfather. Dr Robert Hamilton, above mentioned, was Professor of Mathematics. He graduated in April, 1816. He married on 14 February 1825, Janet (more frequently called Jessy) Fraser (born 14 February 1799; died 8 August 1870), daughter of Provost Alexander Fraser.

== Publications ==
- On the Settlement of Crofters
- On the Cultivation of Chicory and Flax in Belgium
- Our Treatment of the Lower and Lowest Classes of Society
- Prevention is Better than Cure
- On the Materials used in Buildings by the ancient Romans
- On the Hills and Valleys, and the Walls and Gates of Rome
- On the Ancient Tombs of Rome and its immediate vicinity
- Punishment and prevention (1857)
- The Water Works of the Ancient Romans, the Natural Springs, Aqueducts, Reservoirs, Baths, and Drains of Rome
- On the Triumphal and Monumental Pillars and Arches of Rome
- Scottish Episcopacy past and present (1860)
- Report on the Aberdeen Industrial Feeding Schools

== Artistic recognition ==
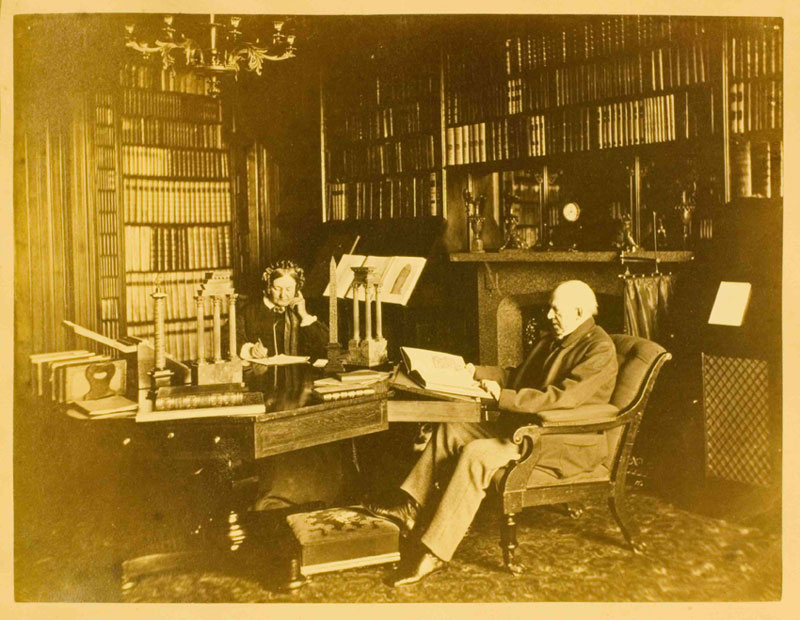
Alexander Thomson of Banchory and his wife Jessie

His photographic portrait, by Hill & Adamson, is held by the Scottish National Portrait Gallery.

== Family ==
In 1825 he married Jessie Fraser (1799–1870). They had no children.
