= Heather Widdows =

British philosopher (born 1972)

- Born: 29 August 1972 (age 54)
- Spouse(s): Professor Matthew Hilton, Vice-Principal for Humanities and Social Sciences, Queen Mary University of London
- Awards: Charles Beale Award for Policy Advancement (2013)

Education
- Education: University of Edinburgh (BD, PhD)

Philosophical work
- Institutions: University of Edinburgh; Imperial College, London; University of Birmingham; University of Warwick
- Main interests: Ethics, Policy and governance issues in particular: • Beauty, Everyday Lookism, Public health Crises • Global Ethics, Moral Theory • Feminist Theory, Women's rights • Bioethics, Reproductive Technologies, Medical Tourism, Genetic Ethics and Governance • War on Terror, Global Justice
- Notable works: Perfect Me: Beauty as an Ethical Ideal
- Website: https://warwick.ac.uk/fac/soc/philosophy/people/summaries/widdows/ https://everydaylookism.bham.ac.uk

Heather Widdows (born 29 August 1972) is a British philosopher, specialising in applied ethics. She was at the University of Birmingham for 22 years, beginning as research fellow and finishing as Pro-Vice-Chancellor (Research and Knowledge Transfer). She is currently a professor in the Department of Philosophy at the University of Warwick. Her research is in the areas of global ethics, feminist philosophy, and philosophy of health and bioethics. In 2005, she was awarded a visiting fellowship at Harvard University.

Her most recent book, Perfect Me: Beauty as an Ethical Ideal (Princeton University Press, 2018), explores how the nature of the beauty ideal is changing - becoming more dominant, demanding and global than ever before. Widdows argues that to address the harms caused by the beauty ideal, we must first understand its ethical nature. Vogue described the book as "groundbreaking", and writer and journalist Bri Lee included Perfect Me in her article Books That Changed Me.

== Education and career ==
Widdows did her undergraduate degree Systematic Theology first class and PhD at the University of Edinburgh. She completed her PhD thesis in 1999 on "The relationship of morality and religion : an investigation of the issue in modern anglophone philosophy". She was supervised by Professor James P. Mackey and Ronald Hepburn. Following the completion of her PhD, spent a year as a post-doctoral research fellow at Imperial College London. She became part of the Department of Philosophy at the University of Birmingham as a research fellow in the Centre for the Study of Global Ethics in 2001. Widdows continued to work there until 2022, becoming a lecturer in 2003, senior lecturer in 2005, and professor of global ethics in 2009. She became the deputy Pro-Vice Chancellor for Research Impact in 2017, and Pro-Vice Chancellor for Research and Knowledge transfer in 2021. In 2022 became a professor in the Department of Philosophy at the University of Warwick.

Widdows is currently the deputy chair of the REF2021 Philosophy sub-panel. Previously she was a member of the REF2014 Philosophy sub-panel.

== Policy Work ==
Heather served as a member of the Nuffield Council on Bioethics from 2014 to 2020 and previously on the UK Biobank Ethics and Governance Council from 2007 to 2013, and a member of Nuffield Council on Bioethics Working Party on Cosmetic Procedures from 2015 to 2016.

Heather's work on appearance-based discrimination, or lookism, was also cited in the Women and Equalities Committee inquiry into 'Changing the perfect picture: an inquiry into body image'.

== Research ==
She has published four sole-authored books: The Moral Vision of Iris Murdoch (Ashgate Publishing Ltd., 2006); Global Ethics: An Introduction (Acumen, 2011); The Connected Self: The Ethics and Governance of the Genetic Individual (Cambridge University Press, 2013) and most recently Perfect Me: Beauty as an Ethical Ideal (Princeton University Press, 2018).

=== Perfect Me ===
Perfect Me: Beauty as an Ethical Ideal (Princeton University Press) was published in 2018. Widdows was supported in writing this book by a Leverhulme Major Research Fellowship. In Perfect Me Widdows argues that beauty is functioning as ethical ideal, transforming our understandings of the world, our judgements of others and ourselves. Perfect Me was also voted one of the 19 best books of 2018 by The Atlantic, and one of the 100 best books to read in a lifetime by Edarabia. Perfect Me has also been mentioned in Vogue, Vogue Japan and Paper Magazine.

=== Beauty Demands Network ===
Widdows is a co-founder of the Beauty Demands Network. The project began with an AHRC Network Grant on 'The Changing Requirements of Beauty' which finished in June 2016. Beauty Demands publishes a blog every two weeks (co-run by Widdows and Dr Fiona MacCallum, University of Warwick), and in 2016 published a Briefing Paper. The briefing paper contains key findings of the network in ethics, psychology and law, and makes policy recommendations based upon these. The briefing paper was launched at the Nuffield Council on Bioethics in June 2016.

== Media ==
Heather has been quoted in The Guardian, the New York Times, Vogue, BBC Newsround, Seventeen. and Le Monde. She has also appeared on BBC Two's Victoria Derbyshire programme, and been interviewed by BBC Radio 4 and ABC Radio (Australia).

== Select bibliography ==
In addition to her books, Widdows has published numerous articles in peer-reviewed journals and chapters in edited collections.

=== Books ===
- Perfect Me: Beauty as an Ethical Ideal (Princeton University Press, 2018)
- The Connected Self: The Ethics and Governance of the Genetic Individual (Cambridge University Press, 2013).
- Global Ethics: An Introduction (Acumen, 2011).
- The Moral Vision of Iris Murdoch (Ashgate Publishing Ltd., 2006).

=== Edited collections ===
- Handbook of Global Ethics, Edited with Darrel Moellendorf (Routledge, 2014)
- Global Social Justice, Edited with Nicola Smith (Routledge, 2011).
- The Governance of Genetic Information: Who Decides?, Edited with Caroline Mullen (Cambridge University Press, 2008).
- Women's Reproductive Rights, Edited with Itziar Alkorta Idiakez and Aitziber Emaldi Cirión (Palgrave, 2006).
