= David F. Wright =

English-born historian

David F. Wright (1937–2008) was an English-born historian, who taught for almost a half-century at University of Edinburgh's New College.

== Biography ==
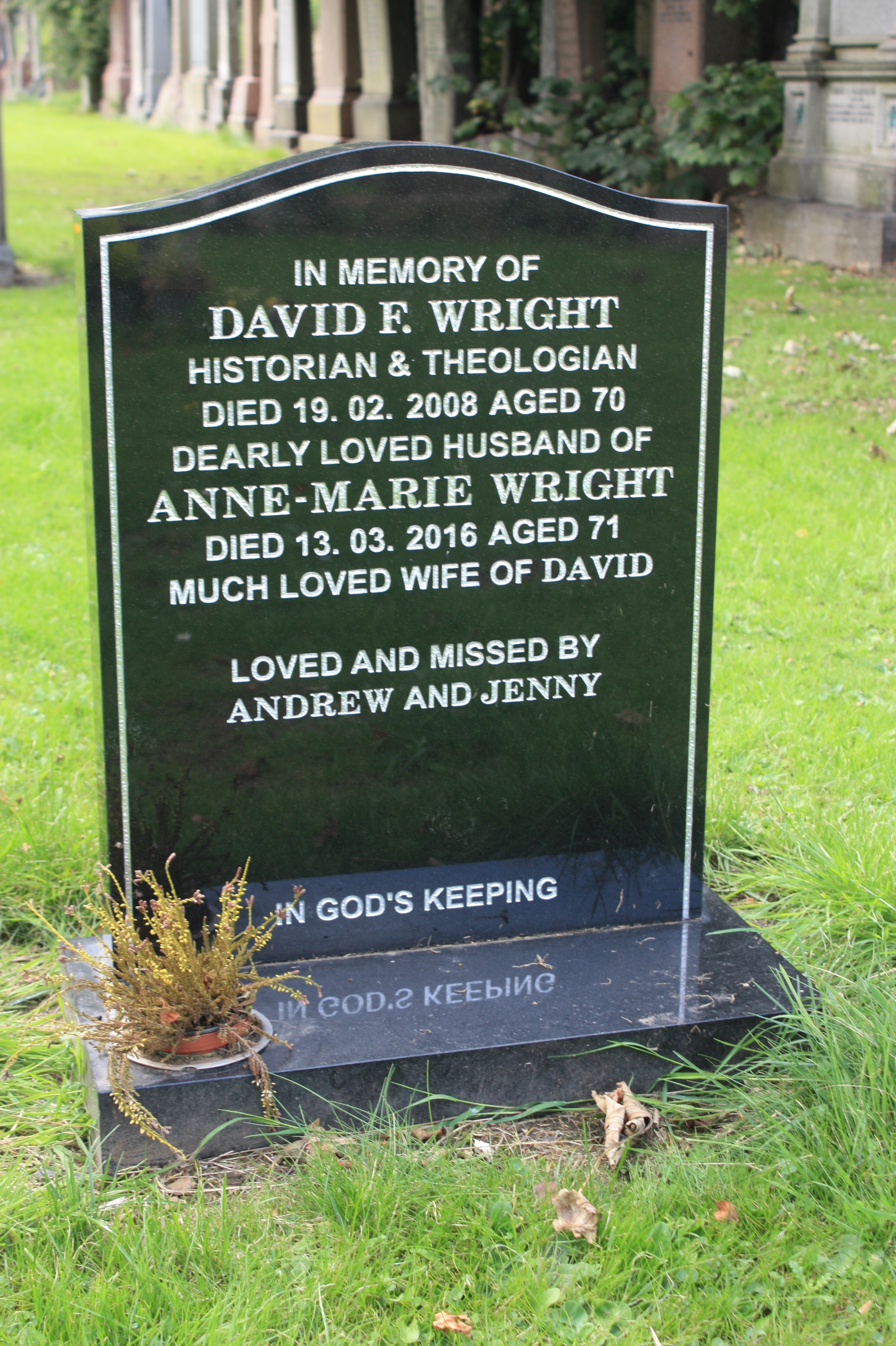
The grave of David F. Wright, Grange Cemetery, Edinburgh

He was born on 2 October 1937 in Hayes, Kent.

Wright received a first in Theology and History from the University of Cambridge and, when finished, did further postgraduate studies at Lincoln College, Oxford, from 1961 to 1964.

He then took a post as lecturer in Ecclesiastical History at New College, Edinburgh in 1964. Although he held views that were theologically conservative, he related well throughout his career with those on the faculty whose positions differed from his own. He was Dean of the Faculty of Divinity from 1988 to 1992, and curator of New College Library from 1994 to 2003.

Wright's broad-ranging scholarship won him acclaim on both sides of the Atlantic, being "internationally distinguished for his contributions in three main fields," namely, Early Church studies, the Reformation, and the question of reception. The significance of his scholarly reputation is further attested by the publication of a Festschrift in honour of his contribution to academic scholarship, which was published in 1997. Edinburgh University awarded him an honorary doctorate (DD) in the same year.

Wright's first research interests were in early Christianity, principally the life and writings of Augustine. He also had a lifelong interest in Christian baptism. He later became fascinated with the Reformation, writing on Martin Bucer, John Calvin, and Peter Martyr Vermigli among others. He lectured in numerous countries, wrote articles, book chapters, dictionaries, and encyclopaedias. He was also a meticulous PhD supervisor of students from Europe, the United States, and Asia.

He died of cancer at the Marie Curie Hospice in Edinburgh on 19 February 2008. He is buried in Grange Cemetery in south Edinburgh.

== Family ==
He was married to Anne-Marie MacDonald (1944-2016). They had two children, Andrew and Jenny.

== Publications ==
- In Understanding be Men with T. C. Hammond (revisor and editor) (1968)
- Common Places of Martin Bucer (translated and annotated) (1972)
- Essays in Evangelical Social Ethics (editor) (1978)
- The Bible in Scottish Life and Literature (editor) (1988)
- New Dictionary of Theology (editor) (1988)
- Chosen by God (editor) (1989)
- Dictionary of Scottish Church History and Theology (editor) (1993)
- What has Infant Baptism done to Baptism (2005)
- Infant Baptism in Historical Perspective (2007)
- Baptism: Three Views (editor) (2009)
