= Norman Porteous =

Norman Walker Porteous (9 September 1898 in Haddington, East Lothian, Scotland – 3 September 2003 in Edinburgh, Scotland) was a noted theologian and writer on Old Testament issues, and the last surviving military officer of the First World War.

== Education ==
Porteous entered the University of Edinburgh as first bursar in 1916, but his studies were interrupted by World War I service in France, where he served as a subaltern in the 13th (Service) Battalion, The Royal Scots.

He graduated from the university with first class honours in Classics in 1922. After time spent studying and teaching in Oxford, St Andrews and Germany, he rejoined the university in 1935 when he was appointed to the Chair of Old Testament Language, Literature and Theology. In 1954, Porteous was president of the Society for Old Testament Study.

== Early career ==
In 1937 Porteous was appointed to the Chair of Hebrew and Semitic Languages at the University of Edinburgh. He was Principal of New College and also Dean of the Faculty from 1964 until his retirement in 1968. He had been commissioned into the Edinburgh University Officers' Training Corps in 1941, but resigned his commission as a Lieutenant in 1945.

== Contributions ==
Norman Porteous was one of the panel of translators of the New English Bible and latterly Dean of the University of Edinburgh, where he was also Senior Professor Emeritus; he may also have been its oldest graduate.

In 1965, Porteous postulated that an anonymous writer wrote the Book of Daniel during the persecution under Antiochus IV Epiphanes. According to this theory the anonymous author attributed events that were witnessed by this writer in the 2nd century BCE to Daniel as prophecies. Paul Roche agreed with Porteous. Since the writer's incomplete and erroneous view of historical details in the second half of the sixth century support the theory of a late date of writing. Porteous and Roche agree that the book is composed of folktales used to fortify the Jewish faith during a time of persecution and oppression by the Hellenized Seleucids four centuries after the Babylonian captivity.

== Death ==
Porteous died at the age of 104.
