= Alexander Martin (Scottish minister) =

Scottish minister (1857–1946)

Alexander Martin (1857 – 1946) was a Scottish minister, successively of the Free Church of Scotland (1843–1900), the United Free Church of Scotland and the Church of Scotland. He was Principal of New College, Edinburgh 1918-1935 and one of the architects of the union of the United Free Church of Scotland and the Church of Scotland in 1929.

== Life ==
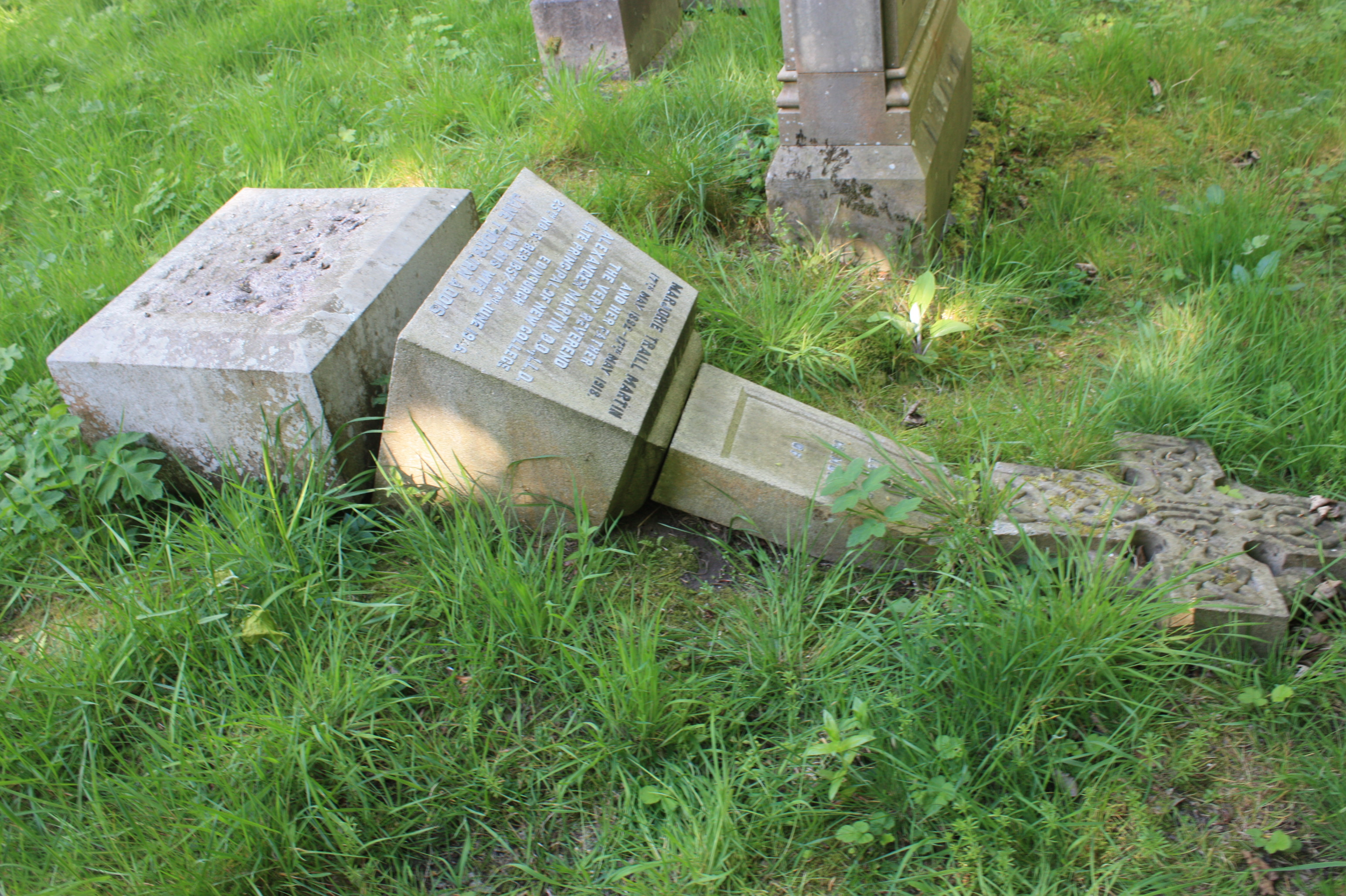
The grave of Very Rev Alexander Martin, Warriston Cemetery

Alexander Martin was born in Panbride near Carnoustie in 1857, the son of the Rev Dr Hugh Martin, the local Free Church of Scotland minister, and his wife, Elizabeth Jane Robertson. He was educated at George Watson's College in Edinburgh.

Martin studied at the University of Edinburgh and New College, Edinburgh. From 1880 to 1883 he served as assistant to the Professor of Moral Philosophy at Edinburgh University.

In 1884 he was ordained to the Morningside congregation of the Free Church of Scotland, Edinburgh. He lived at 3 Merchiston Bank Avenue.

In 1897 he became Professor of Apologetics and Pastoral Theology in New College, Edinburgh, and moved to 4 Albert Terrace, an attractive house in the Morningside district. By 1910 he had moved to 16 Eildon Street in the Inverleith area.

He succeeded Alexander Whyte as Principal of New College from 1918 in the United Free Church of Scotland which continued till 1935 in the reunited Church of Scotland. During his time at New College, he served as Moderator of the General Assembly of the United Free Church of Scotland twice; in 1920 and 1929. He was appointed Cunningham Lecturer for 1928, and the subject of his lectures was Apologetics. The lectures were published in 1933 with the title The Finality of Jesus for Faith.

In 1929 Principal Martin guided the United Free Church of Scotland into union with the Church of Scotland, serving as Moderator of the last General Assembly of the old United Free Church. He was appointed Chaplain to the King in Scotland in 1929.

He retired from New College in 1935, and died on 14 June 1946. He is buried in Warriston Cemetery. His gravestone is toppled and broken.

Alexander contributed to his father's entry in the Dictionary of National Biography, 1885-1900, Volume 36.

== Artistic recognition ==
His sketch portrait by David Foggie is held by the Scottish National Portrait Gallery.

== Family ==
In 1887 he married Jane Thorburn, the daughter of the Rev Dr Thomas Addis DD, whom he assisted as minister of the Morningside congregation.

== Publications ==
Volumes

- Winning the Soul. (1896)
- The Finality of Jesus for Faith. (1933)

Pamphlets

- Christ the Centre of Christianity. (1883)
- Man's Debt to Man. (1888)
- The Problem of Apologetic. (1897)
- United Free Church Assembly Addresses. (1920)
- Church Union in Scotland: The First Phase. (1923)
- Church Union in Scotland: The First Stage Completed. (1925)
- Church Union: Nearing the Goal. (1928)
- The Re-union of the Scottish Church. (1929)
- Presbyterian Orders and the Admission of Ministers from other Churches. (1941)
