= George Smeaton (theologian) =

Scottish theologian and Greek scholar

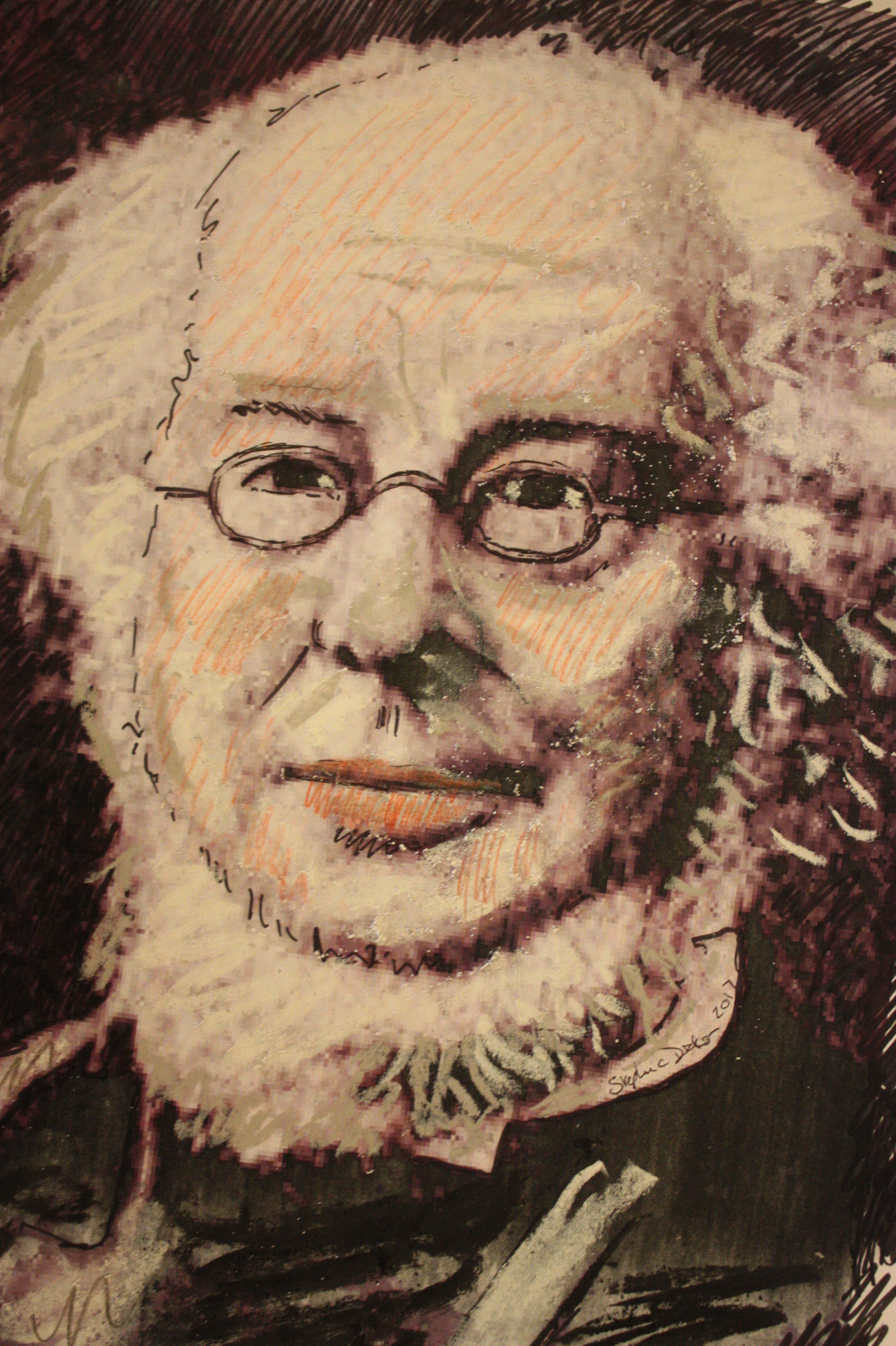
Pastel drawing of Smeaton

George Smeaton (8 April 1814 – 14 April 1889) was a 19th-century Scottish theologian and Greek scholar.

== Life ==
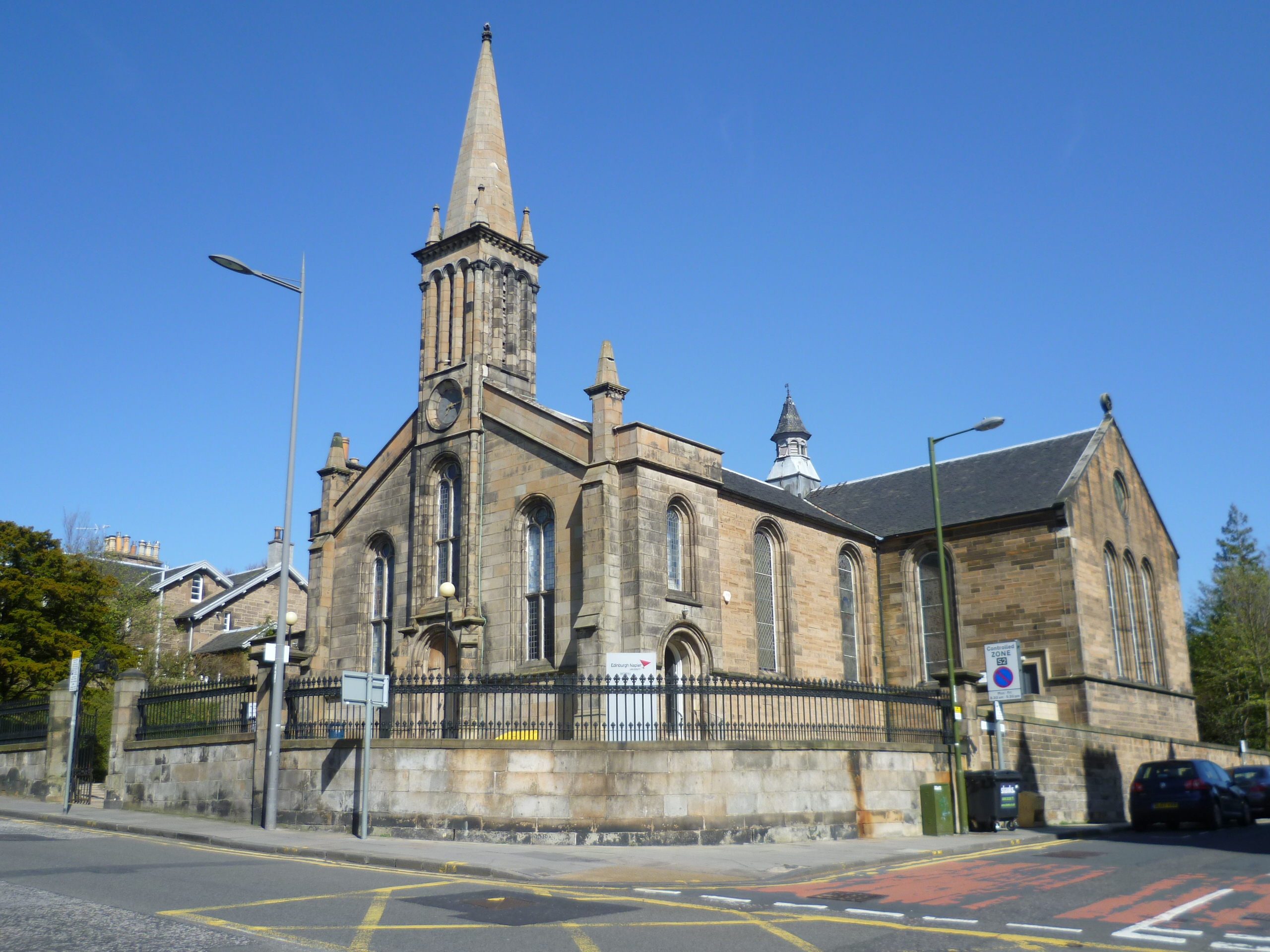
Former Morningside Parish Church, Edinburgh

He was born in Greenlaw, Berwickshire on 8 April 1814.

He studied Theology at Edinburgh University and Divinity Hall in Edinburgh. From around 1835 he operated as an urban missionary in North Leith, the harbour area of Edinburgh.

He was ordained by the Church of Scotland as first minister of the newly completed Morningside Parish Church in south Edinburgh in 1839, with Thomas Chalmers as one of his church elders.

He was translated to Falkland in Fife in 1840. He left the established Church of Scotland in the Disruption of 1843 to become one of the founders of the Free Church of Scotland. His first charge was Auchterarder Free Church. Although this might look a remote and irrelevant posting, Auchterarder was central to the entire Disruption, so the post actually had a kudos at the time, and could be viewed as important as a posting to one of the major cities at that time.

He served as professor of theology at the Free Church College in Aberdeen from 1854 to 1857, and then as Professor of New Testament Exegesis at New College, Edinburgh from 1857 until his death.

He died at home, 13 South Mansionhouse Road in Edinburgh on 14 April 1889 and is buried in the Grange Cemetery with his wife Janet Helen Goold (d. 1893).

== Family ==
In 1840 he married Janet Helen Goold, daughter of Rev William Goold of 28 Buccleuch Place in Edinburgh. She was sister to Rev William Henry Goold.

They had three daughters and two sons. William Smeaton emigrated to New Zealand and worked as an editor.

== Works ==
- The Doctrine of the Atonement, As Taught by Christ Himself (1868)
- Memoir of Alexander Thomson of Banchory (1869)
- The Doctrine of the Atonement, As Taught by the Apostles (1870)
- The Doctrine of the Holy Spirit (1882).

== Gallery ==
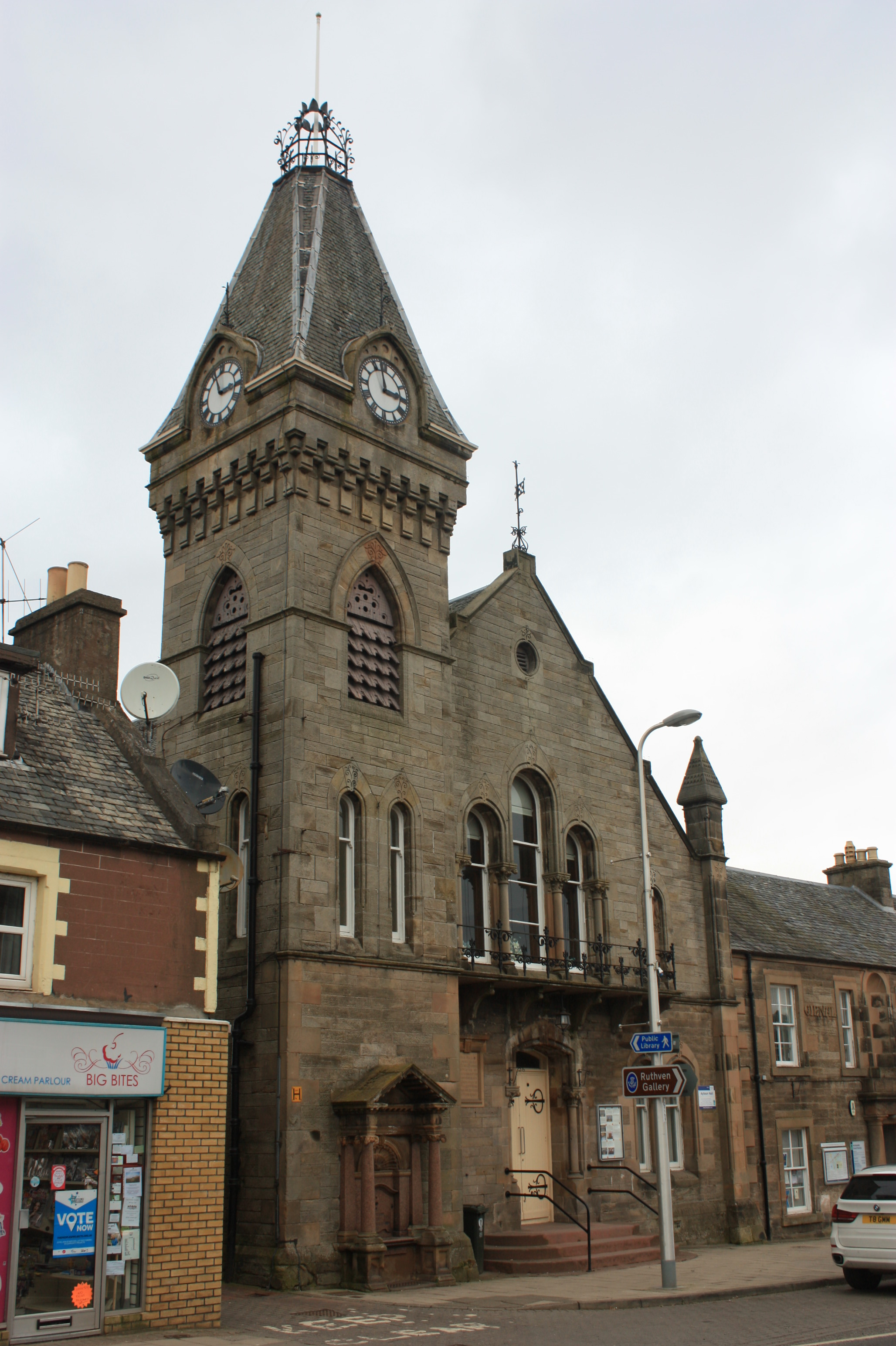
Auchterarder Free Church

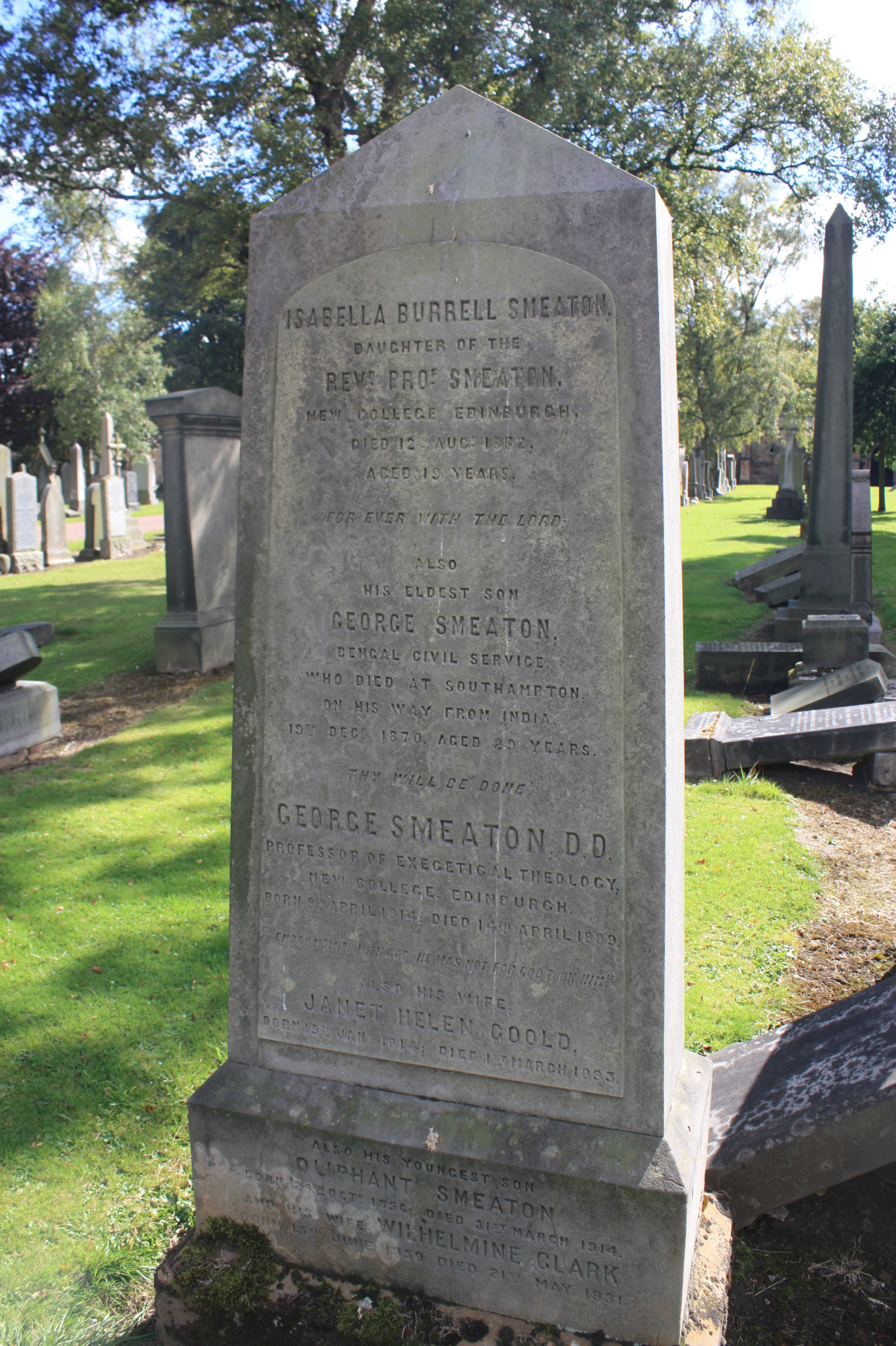
The grave of Rev Prof George Smeaton, Grange Cemetery, Edinburgh
