= Alexander Campbell Cheyne =

The Rev. Professor Alexander Campbell Cheyne (1 June 1924 – 31 March 2006), commonly known as A. C. Cheyne, was one of the foremost Scottish scholars of Church History, teaching at New College, Edinburgh from 1958 until his retirement in 1986.

Alec Cheyne helped students gain a nuanced appreciation of key personalities in Scottish history which rose above the polarities of Scottish ecclesiastical conflict.

== Works ==
Among his major publications are:

- The Transforming of The Kirk (1983) on Church in Scotland during the Victorian Era
- The Practical and the Pious (1985), on the life and work of Thomas Chalmers
- The Ten Years' Conflict and the Disruption (1993) on the secession of the Free Church of Scotland from the Church of Scotland in 1843.

The festschrift Scottish Christianity in the Modern World (2000) was recently compiled in his honour.
