= Hugh Watt (moderator) =

Scottish minister and historian

Hugh Watt (12 December 1879 – 5 September 1968) was a Scottish minister and historian. He served as Moderator of the General Assembly of the Church of Scotland in 1950. He was president of the Scottish Church History Society 1938 to 1941.

== Life ==
He was born on 12 December 1879 at Knocklandside near Kilmaurs in Ayrshire, the son of John Watt (1849–1930) and his wife Agnes Taylor Dickie.

He is thought to have studied divinity at Glasgow University and was living in the Bearsden district in 1914 with his wife and first child.

In 1919 he was appointed professor of church history at New College, Edinburgh. He became principal of the college in 1946 and retired in 1950.

He succeeded Very Rev George Simpson Duncan as moderator in 1950 and in turn was succeeded by Very Rev William White Anderson in 1951.

He died in Edinburgh on 5 September 1968 aged 88.

== Family ==
Around 1910 Watt married Mary Smith Taylor, and they had three children. His daughter Nancy Watt became one of the first female elders of the Church of Scotland in 1967.

== Publications ==
- New College, Edinburgh: A Centenary History (1946)
- Representative Churchmen of Twenty Centuries
- Thomas Chalmers and the Disruption
- John Knox in Controversy
- Recalling the Scottish Covenants (1946)
