= Andrew Ross (minister) =

Andrew Ross (10 May 1931 – 26 July 2008) was a Scottish minister, missionary and academic.

Ross was born on 10 May 1931 to Christian Glen Walton and George Adams Ross. He was educated at Dalkeith High School and the University of Edinburgh. After National Service in the RAF he trained to become a Minister at New College, Edinburgh. He was as a missionary in Malawi from 1958 to 1965. He was Senior Lecturer in Ecclesiastical History at the University of Edinburgh from 1966 to 1998.
