= James Buchanan (minister) =

Scottish theologian

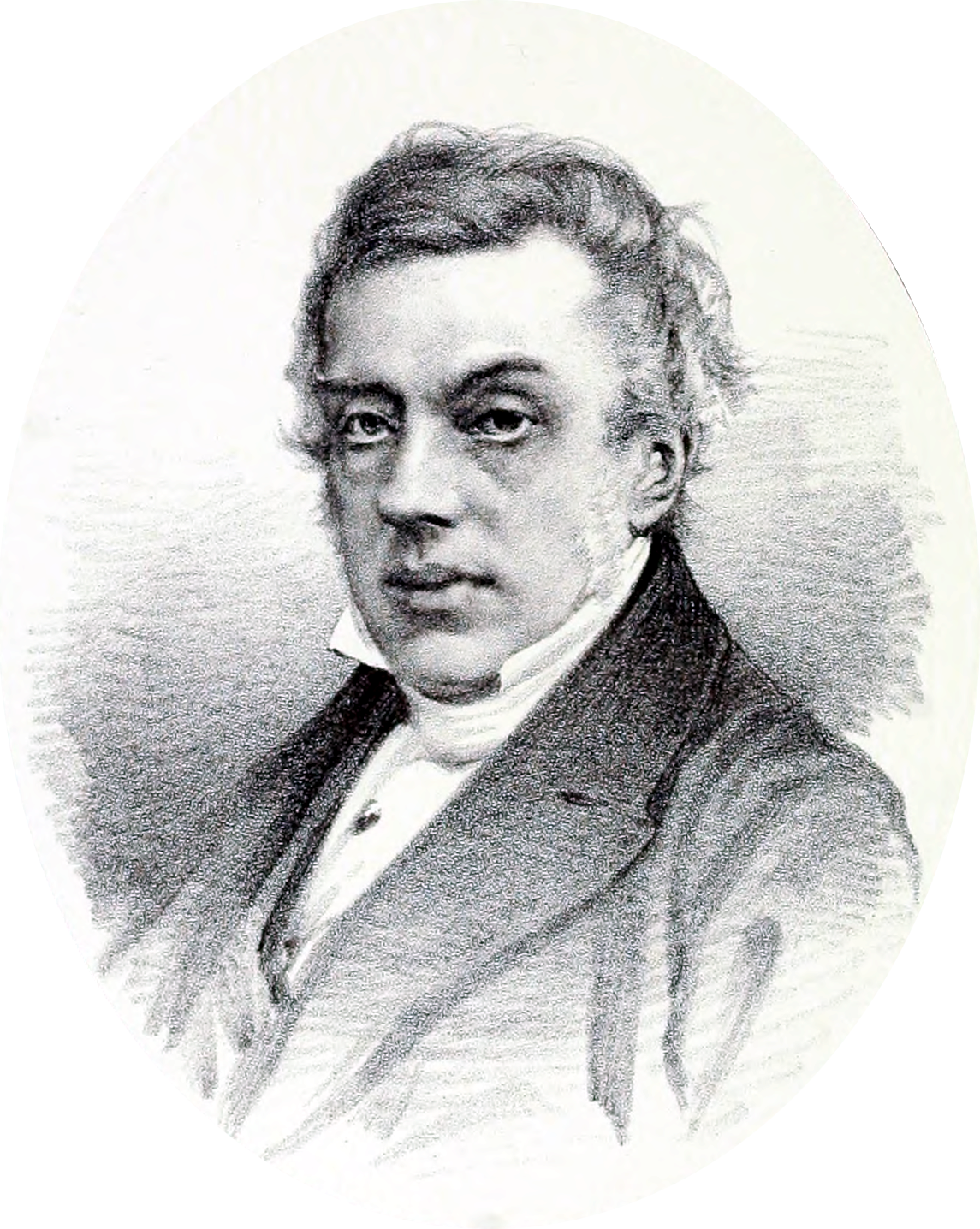
- Buchanan from Disruption Worthies
- Born: 14 April 1804; Paisley, Scotland
- Died: 19 April 1870 (aged 66); Edinburgh, Scotland
- Occupation(s): Pastor, theologian
- Theological work
- Tradition or movement: Presbyterianism

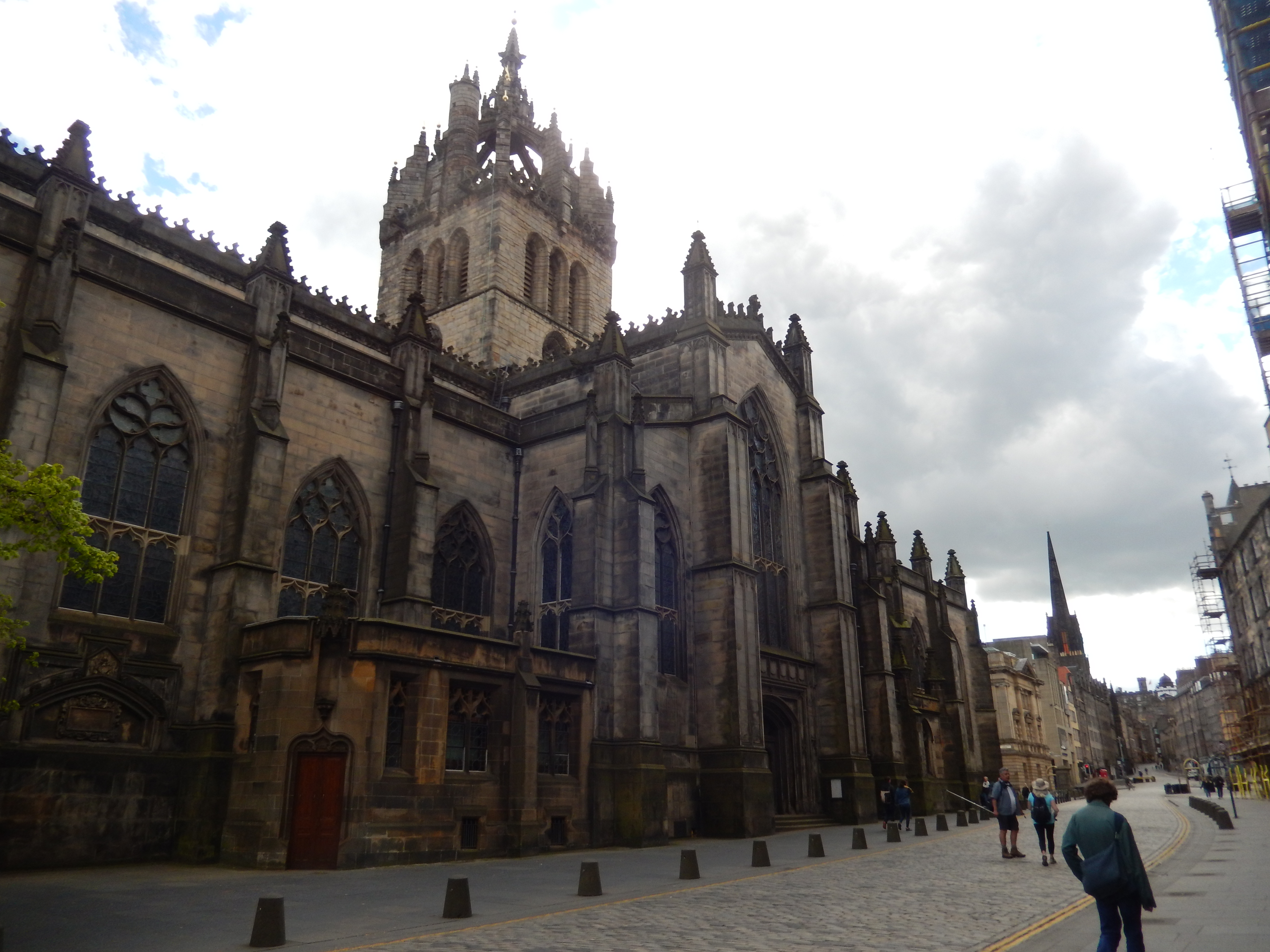
St Giles Cathedral

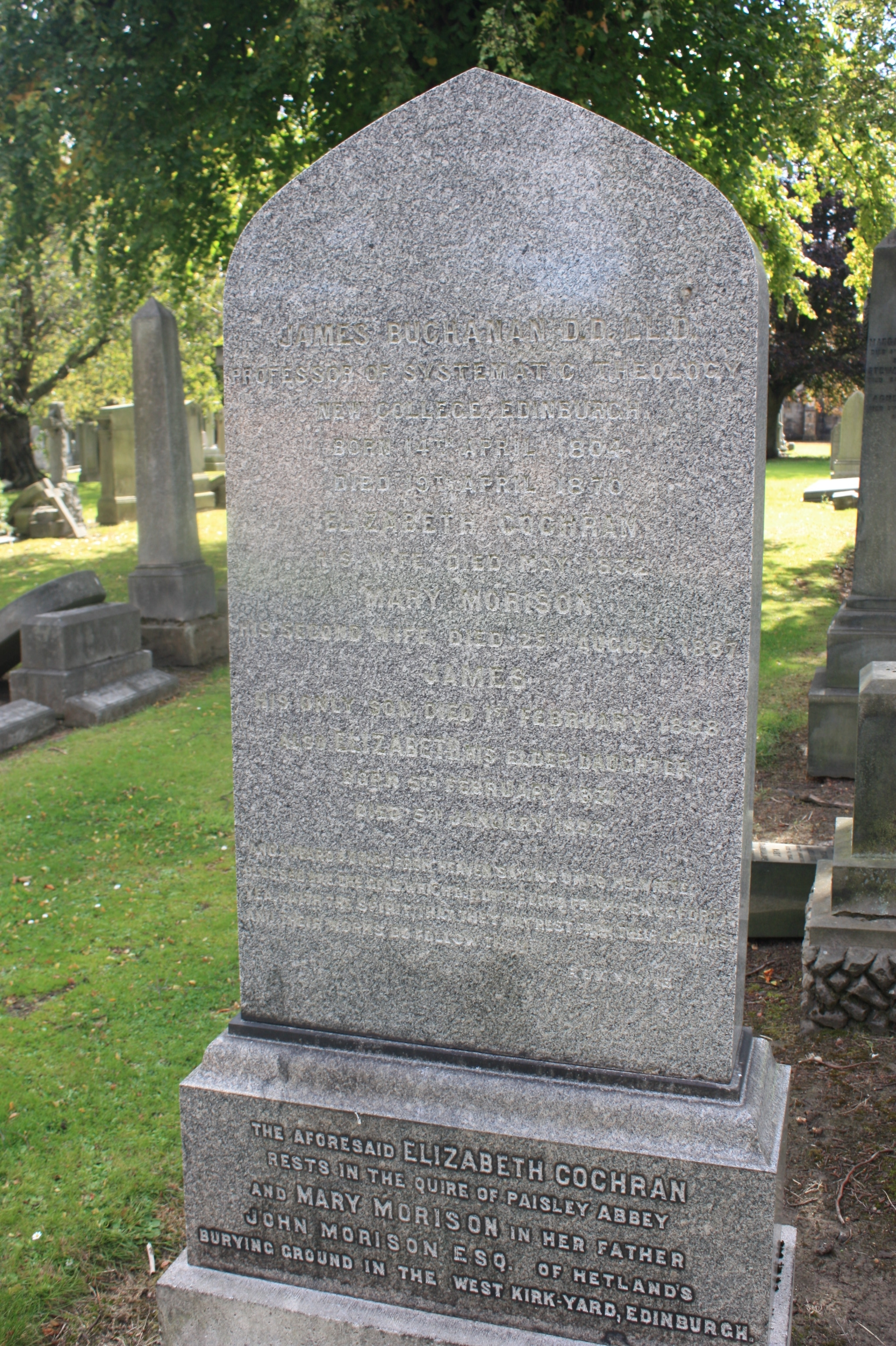
James Buchanan's grave, Grange Cemetery

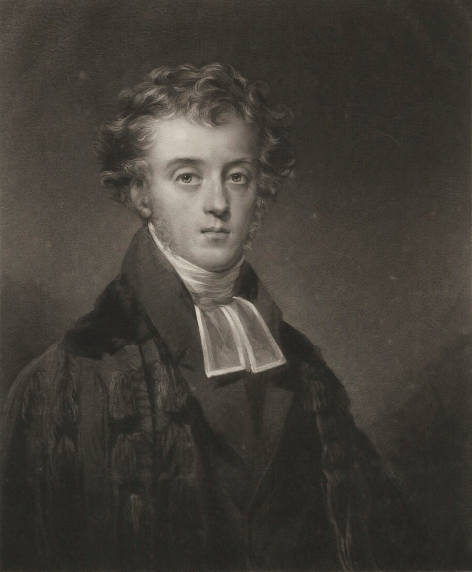
James Buchanan young

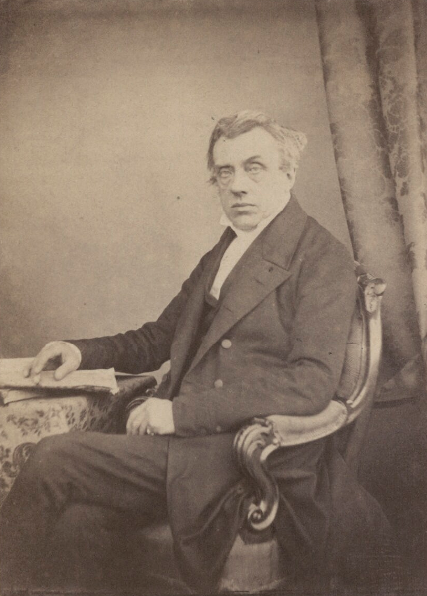
James Buchanan - Free Church of Scotland

James Buchanan (1804–1870) was a preacher and theological writer. He was born in 1804 at Paisley, and studied at the University of Glasgow. In 1827 he was ordained Church of Scotland minister of Roslin, near Edinburgh, and in 1828 he was translated to charge of North Leith. In 1840 Buchanan was translated to the High Church (St. Giles’), Edinburgh, and in 1843, after the Disruption, he became first minister of St. Stephen's Free Church. In 1845 he was appointed professor of apologetics in the New College (Free church), Edinburgh, and in 1847, on the death of Dr. Thomas Chalmers, he was transferred to the chair of systematic theology, continuing there till his resignation in 1868.

== Life ==
James Buchanan was born in Paisley on 14 April 1804 as the eldest son of James Buchanan, a wine merchant. He was educated at Paisley Grammar School.

After studies at Glasgow University and Edinburgh University, he was licensed to preach as a Church of Scotland minister by the Presbytery of Paisley in 1826.

He was ordained as a minister of the Church of Scotland at Roslin in November 1827 and translated the North Leith Parish Church in September 1828 in place of Walter Foggo Ireland, where he attained great fame as a preacher. In 1840, Buchanan was called to second charge of St Giles Cathedral in Edinburgh, in place of George Husband Baird. In this role he was under Rev Robert Gordon in first charge.

In the Disruption of 1843 he left the established church and joined the Free Church of Scotland. From 1843 to 1845 he was minister of the Free High Church of Edinburgh then moved to St Stephen's Free Church in Stockbridge, Edinburgh in 1845. From May 1845, he was additionally appointed as Professor of Apologetics at the newly-built New College of the Free Church on the Mound in central Edinburgh. In 1847 he succeeded Thomas Chalmers as Professor of Systematic Theology, which he held until 1868 when he retired.

He received an honorary Doctor of Divinity (DD) from Princeton University in 1844 and an honorary Doctor of Laws (LLD) from Glasgow University in 1852.

He died on 19 April 1870 at 51 Lauriston Place, Edinburgh. He is buried in the north-east section of the Grange Cemetery, facing the main north path.

== Family ==
In February 1829 he married Elizabeth Cochrane, daughter of John Cochrane, a Glasgow merchant. They had a son James (1829-1888) and a daughter Elizabeth (b.1831) before his wife's early death in May 1832. In December 1836 he married Mary Morison, daughter of John Morison of Hetland, with whom he had a daughter, Janet (b.1840).

Mary Morison died in 1887 and is buried with her parents in St Cuthbert's Churchyard in Edinburgh.

== Works ==
- 1837, Comfort in Affliction
- 1840, Improvement of Affliction
- 1842, The Office and Work of the Holy Spirit
- 1843, On the Tracts for the Times
- 1855, Studies in apologetics, Faith in God and atheism compared in their essential nature, theoretical grounds and practical influence
- 1857, Modern Atheism under its forms of Pantheism, Materialism, Secularism, Development, and Natural Laws
- 1861, The ‘Essays and Reviews’ Examined
- 1864, Analogy Considered as a Guide to Truth and Applied as an Aid to Faith
- 1867 Doctrine of Justification - An Outline of Its History in the Church and of Its Exposition from Scripture (1866 Cunningham lectures)

== See also ==
- Justification (theology)
