= New College, Edinburgh =

Divinity school of the University of Edinburgh

Coordinates: 55.9498°N 3.1952°W

New College on The Mound

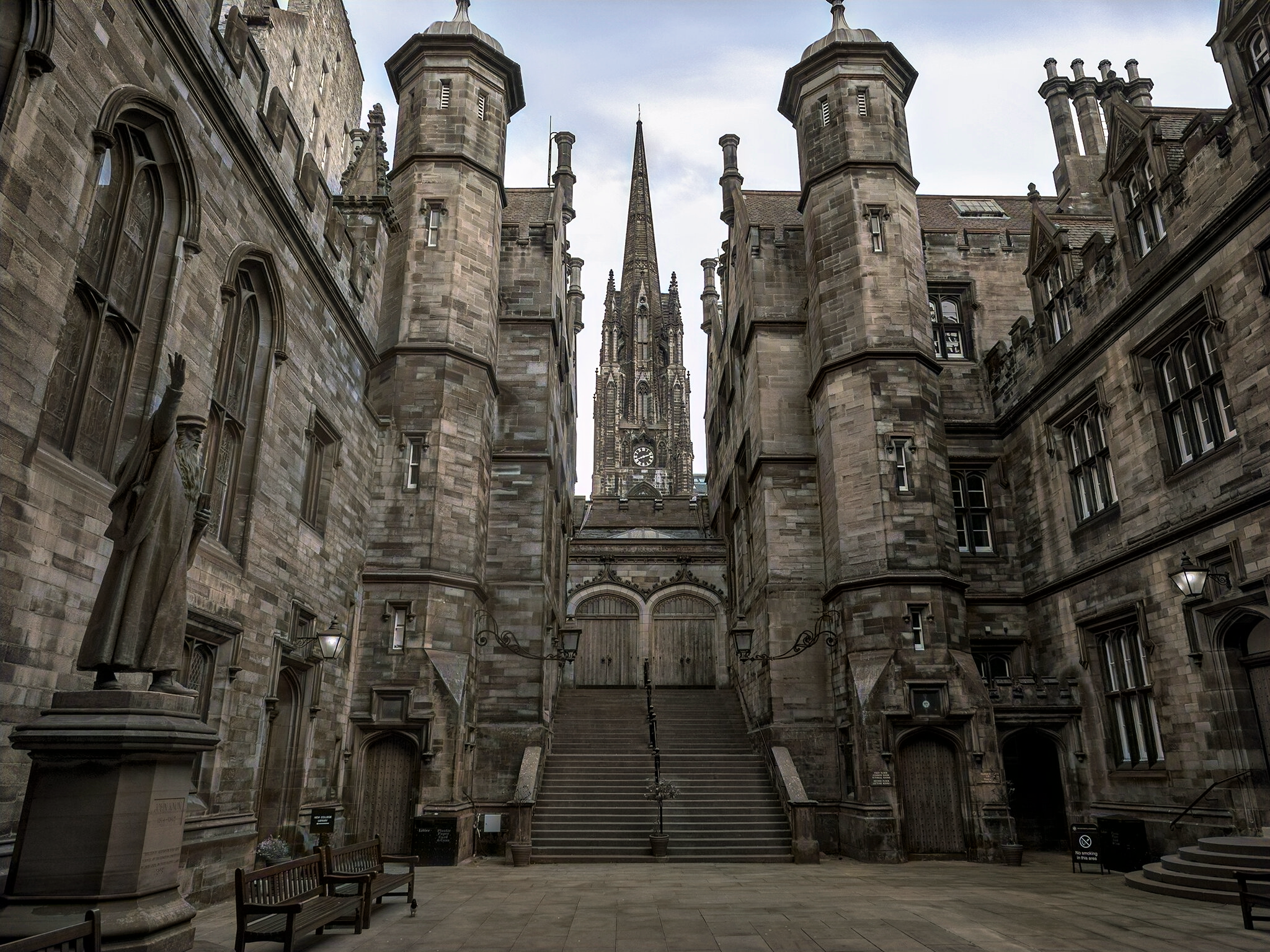
New College Quad. The spire of Victoria Hall is prominent in the centre, though it is separate from the New College building.

New College is a historic building at the University of Edinburgh which houses the university's School of Divinity. It is one of the largest and most renowned centres for studies in Theology and Religious Studies in the United Kingdom. Students in M.A., M.Th. and Ph.D. degree programmes come from over 30 countries, and are taught by almost 40 full-time members of the academic staff. New College is situated on The Mound in the north of Edinburgh's Old Town.

New College originally opened its doors in 1846 as a college of the Free Church of Scotland, later of the United Free Church of Scotland, and since 1935 has been the home of the School of Divinity (formerly the Faculty of Divinity) of the University of Edinburgh. As "New College" it continues the historical commitment to offer a programme of academic preparation for ministry in the Church of Scotland, also made use of by ministerial candidates from other churches. In the 1970s the Faculty of Divinity also began offering undergraduate degrees in Theology and Religious Studies, and students in these programmes now make up the majority of the nearly 300 undergraduates enrolled in any given year.

== History ==
The founding of New College came as a result of a religious conflict that emerged from the Disruption of 1843 in which clergy and laity left the established Church of Scotland to form the Free Church of Scotland – free from state connections and submitting only to the authority of Christ. New College was established as an institution for the Free Church of Scotland to educate future ministers and the Scottish leadership, who would in turn guide the moral and religious lives of the Scottish people. New College opened its doors to 168 students in November 1843 and, under the guidance of its first principal Thomas Chalmers, oversaw the construction of the current building. A competition for design of the Free High Church and Free Church College was held in 1844 and, though not one of the winners, the design by William Henry Playfair was chosen and built 1845–1850. At the formation of the United Free Church, the United Free Church was granted the buildings, and the continuing Free Church operated from new premises in 1907. This Free Church College was renamed Edinburgh Theological Seminary in 2014.

Prior to the 1929 reunion of the Church of Scotland, candidates for the ministry in the United Free Church studied at New College, whilst candidates for the old Church of Scotland studied in the Divinity Faculty of the University of Edinburgh. During the 1930s the two institutions came together, sharing the New College site on The Mound. "New College" can designate the site itself, or the legal entity that continues to function in an official relationship with the Church of Scotland, the Principal of New College appointed by the General Assembly of the Church of Scotland and responsible particularly for Church of Scotland candidates for ministry.

The current principal is the Reverend Professor Alison Jack. As the "School of Divinity," however, it is a unit in the University of Edinburgh with a much wider remit, and is led by the Head of the School of Divinity (currently Professor Helen Bond), who is appointed by the university, and who oversees the larger academic and financial operation. The Chair of Divinity at the School of Divinity is the oldest one at the University of Edinburgh, which can be dated back in 1620. Professor Rachel Muers took up the chair in August 2022 as the first woman who holds the post. Over the years, a number of notable figures have been among its academic staff, including Robert Rainy, Thomas Chalmers, Hugh Ross Mackintosh, James Barr, Thomas F. Torrance, James S. Stewart, John Baillie, John McIntyre, Ruth Page, Norman Porteous, Marcella Althaus-Reid, Andrew F. Walls, David Fergusson and others.

As part of the celebration of the 175th anniversary of New College, the School of Divinity adopted the motto "Quaerite et Invenietis" (Seek and You Shall Find), voted for by the staff and students of the college, and was granted a Coat of Arms by Joseph Morrow, the current Lord Lyon King of Arms and an alumnus of New College.

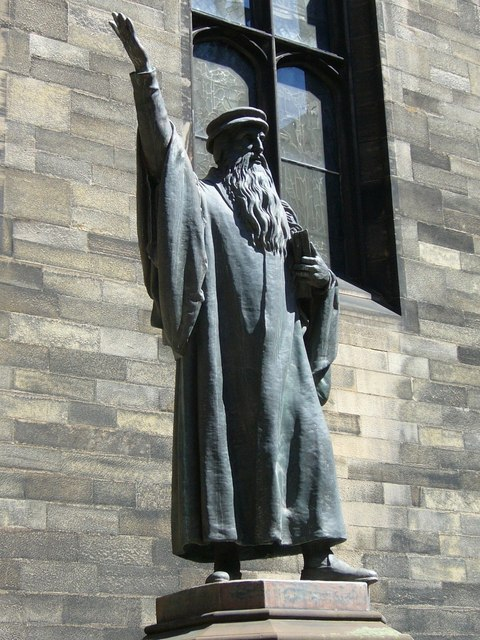
Statue of John Knox in the New College quadrangle

== Academics ==
Members of academic staff are all employees of the University of Edinburgh, and are today an international body of scholars of various persuasions in religious matters.

=== Academic ratings ===
In the 2021 Research Excellence Framework, the School of Divinity was ranked 1st in Scotland, and 5th in the UK, for the quality and breadth of its theological research.

=== Undergraduate ===
The School of Divinity offers six different undergraduate (Honours) degrees. The MA Theology allows students to focus on traditional areas of Christian studies (Biblical Studies, Ecclesiastical History, Christian Ethics, and Systematic Theology). The MA Religious Studies introduces students to the methods of the study of religion and a variety of religious traditions such as indigenous religions, Islam, Judaism, Christianity, Buddhist and Hindu traditions. The Bachelor of Divinity prepares candidates for the ministry (and is open to other interested students also). The MA Religious Studies and English/Scottish Literature, the MA Philosophy and Theology, and the MA Divinity and Classics allow students to work cross-disciplinary.

View from Princes Street Gardens

=== Postgraduate ===
The School also offers several M.Th., M.Sc. and M.Res. degree programmes (Biblical Studies, Science and Religion, Theology in History, Theology and Ethics, World Christianity, Islam & Christian–Muslim Relations, and Religious Studies), and is an internationally known centre for PhD studies in a broad spectrum of specialities. There is no confessional test for staff or students. Only a portion of the undergraduate students are ministerial candidates, and the majority enter a variety of careers after studies (e.g. teachers, libraries, TV/radio production, civil service, further professional studies in law, finance, social work, etc.).

=== Research Centres ===
New College is home to several research centres: the Centre for the Study of World Christianity (established by Andrew F. Walls, which has its own collection of archival material on the history of Christian missions); the Centre for Theology and Public Issues; and the centre for the Study of Christian Origins.

== Facilities ==
New College is located in the city centre on Mound Place, overlooking Princes Street Gardens, the Scottish National Gallery, and Princes Street. The neo-gothic building was designed by the respected 19th century architect William Henry Playfair.

=== Library ===
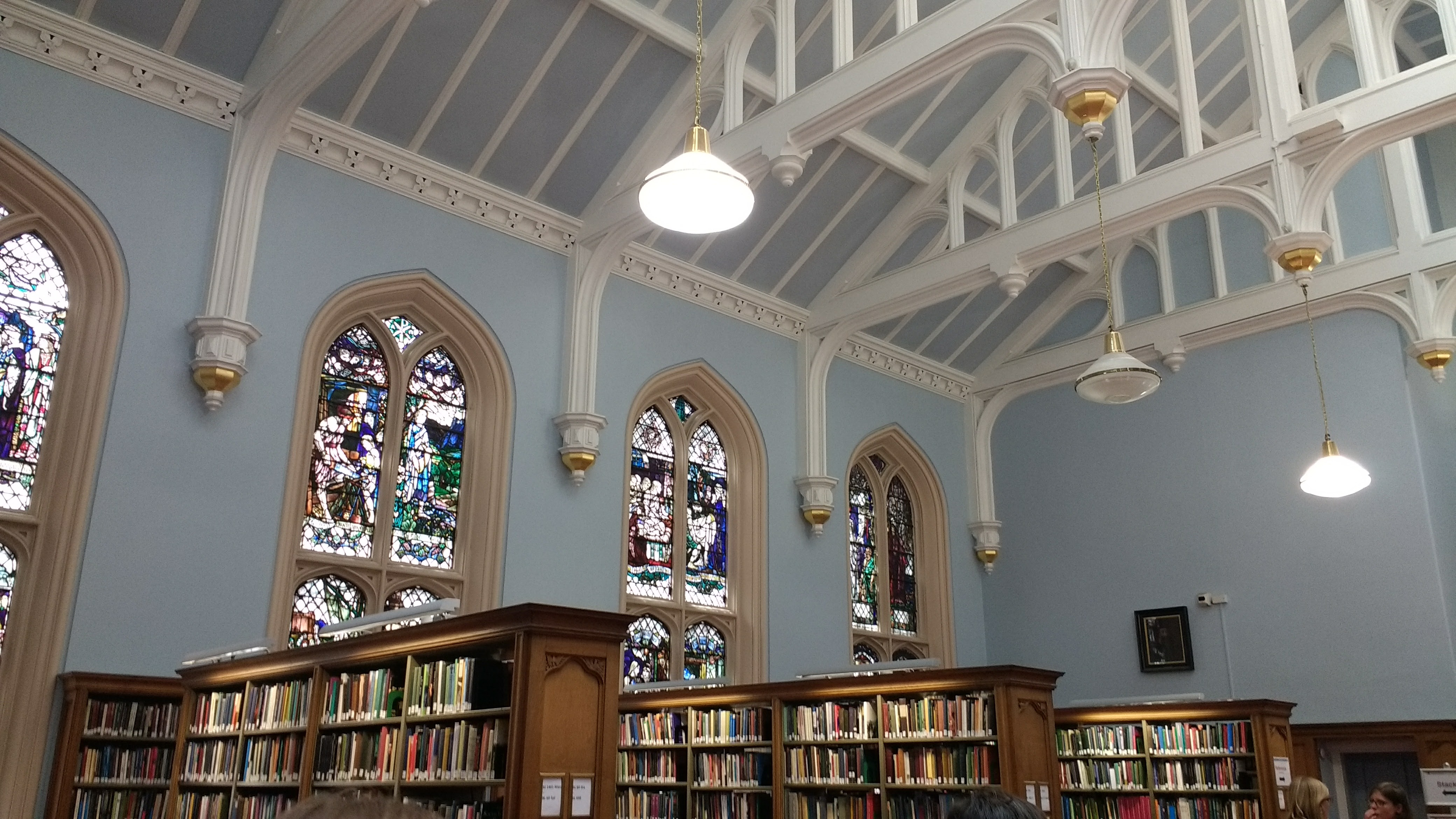
New College Library

The New College library was founded in 1843 as the Library of the Free Church College. It is the largest single-site theological library in the United Kingdom, holding a large collection of manuscripts, including the papers of Thomas Chalmers, John Baillie, J. H. Oldham and James S. Stewart.

The library is situated in the eastern wing of New College, and its reading hall was originally built as the sanctuary of the Free High Kirk.

=== Rainy Hall ===
Rainy Hall is a gothic revival dining hall, adorned with heraldry and featuring a hammerbeam roof. It is at the centre of college life, used by students and faculty for conversation and meals.

=== General Assembly Hall ===
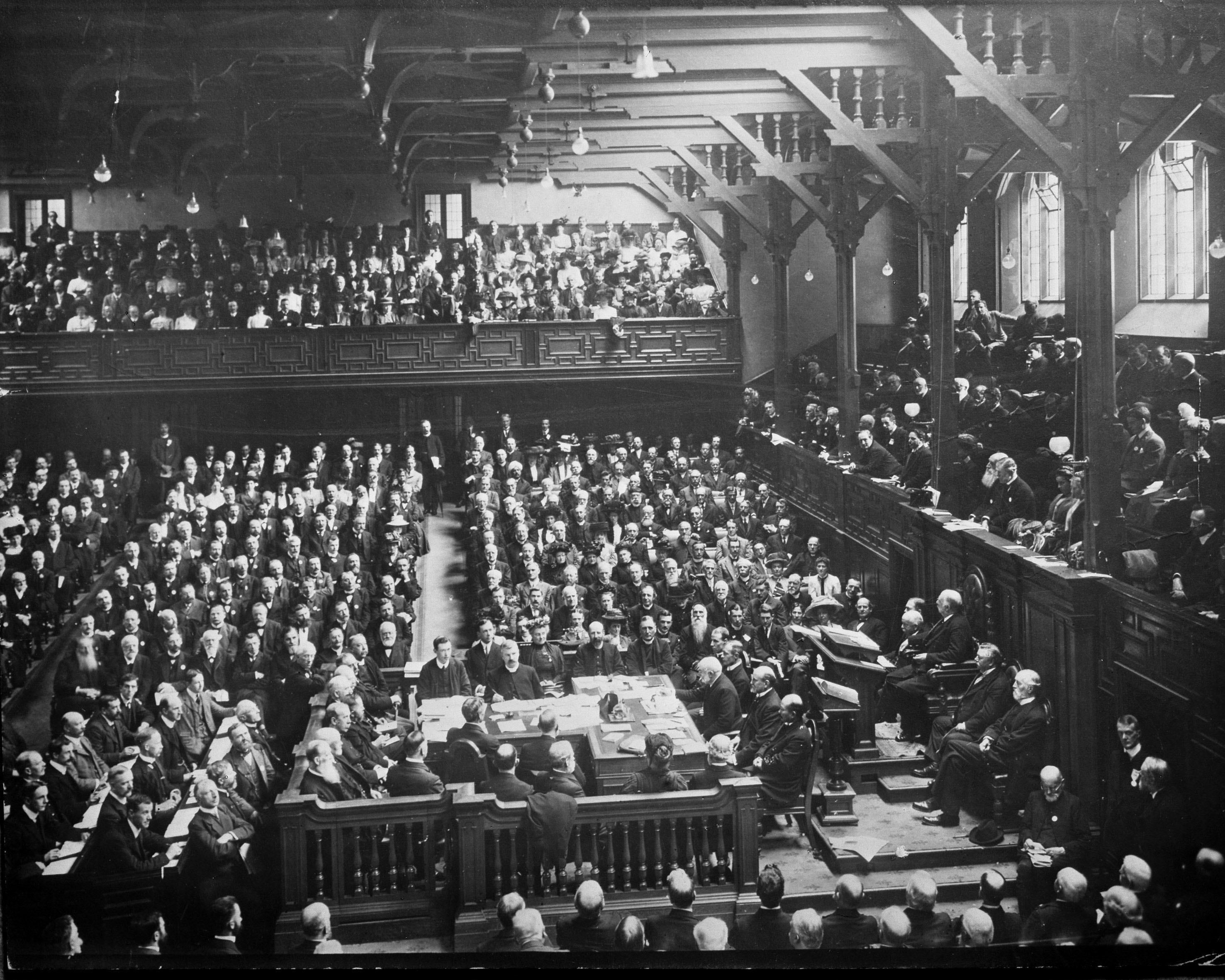
The 1910 World Missionary Conference held in the General Assembly Hall

As well as the teaching facilities and the library, the New College complex includes the General Assembly Hall of the Church of Scotland, which remains the property of the Church, and where annual meetings of the General Assembly of the Church of Scotland are held. This hall was used during the 1910 World Missionary Conference, and was the temporary home for the debating chamber of the Scottish Parliament from its establishment in 1999 until the completion of the new Scottish Parliament Building at Holyrood in 2004.

== People ==
=== Principals of New College ===
Name	Years served	Academic Field	Denomination
Thomas Chalmers	1846-1847	Theology	Free Church of Scotland
William Cunningham	1847-1861	Church History, Theology	Free Church of Scotland
Robert Smith Candlish	1862-1873	Theology	Free Church of Scotland
Robert Rainy	1874-1906	Church History	United Free Church of Scotland
Marcus Dods	1907-1909	New Testament	United Free Church of Scotland
Alexander Whyte	1909-1918	New Testament	United Free Church of Scotland
Alexander Martin	1918-1935	Apologetics	Church of Scotland
William Alexander Curtis	1935-1946	Theology	Church of Scotland
Hugh Watt	1946-1950	Church History	Church of Scotland
John Baillie	1950-1956	Theology	Church of Scotland
J. H. S. Burleigh	1956-1964	Church History	Church of Scotland
Norman Porteous	1964-1968	Old Testament	Church of Scotland
John McIntyre	1968-1974	Theology	Church of Scotland
D. W. D. (Bill) Shaw	1974-1978	Theology	Church of Scotland
Andrew Ross	1978-1984	Church History	Church of Scotland
Alexander Campbell Cheyne	1984-1986	Church History	Church of Scotland
Duncan B. Forrester	1986-1996	Christian Ethics and Practical Theology	Church of Scotland
Ruth Page	1996-2000	Theology	Church of Scotland
A. Graeme Auld	2000-2008	Old Testament	Church of Scotland
David Fergusson	2008-2018	Theology	Church of Scotland
Susan Hardman Moore	2018-2022	Church History	Church of Scotland
Alison Jack	2022-now	Bible and Literature	Church of Scotland

=== Notable faculty ===
==== 20th and 21st century ====
- Afe Adogame
- Marcella Althaus-Reid
- Hans M. Barstad
- F. F. Bruce
- Gary Badcock
- Jane Dawson
- John C McDowell
- John Clark Love Gibson
- Larry Hurtado
- Alistair Kee
- Harry Kennedy
- David Kerr
- Elizabeth Koepping
- Daniel Lamont
- Christian Lange
- James P. Mackey
- Hugh Ross Mackintosh
- William Manson
- Bruce McCormack
- A. R. McEwen
- John McIntyre
- Paul Nimmo
- Michael Northcott
- Noel O’Donoghue
- Oliver O'Donovan
- Oliver Shaw Rankin
- Douglas Templeton
- Elizabeth Templeton
- T. Jack Thompson
- G. T. Thomson
- Thomas F. Torrance
- Kevin Vanhoozer
- Géza Vermes
- Andrew Walls
- Roland Walls
- Adam Cleghorn Welch
- Frank Whaling
- David F. Wright
- Nicolas Wyatt
- John Zizioulas

Martin Luther King, Jr applied in 1951 to enter the Edinburgh School of Divinity when studying for Baptist ministry. but chose to enter the University of Boston in the United States instead.

==== 19th century ====
- David Welsh
- John Duncan
- John Duns
- Alexander Campbell Fraser
- George Smeaton
- James Bannerman
- James Buchanan
- Andrew B. Davidson
- Alexander Duff
- John Fleming
- James Young Simpson
- Thomas Smith
- James MacGregor
- William Garden Blaikie
- Alexander Black

== Arms ==
Coat of arms of New College, Edinburgh

Notes
Granted by Lyon Morrow on 8 September 2021.
Crest
The two towers of New College Edinburgh Proper
Escutcheon
Argent a saltire per fess Purpure and Azure surmounted of a book expanded Or in chief a burning bush enflamed Proper in base situated on a rock Proper a triple-towered castle embattled Sable masoned Argent and topped with three flags Gules windows and portcullis shut of the last.
Supporters
Two human figures representing diversity one dressed in the academic gown and hood of a Master of Divinity and one dressed in the academic gown and hood of a Master of Arts (Religious Studies) both from the University of Edinburgh all Proper.
Motto
Quaerite Et Invenietis
