= Charles Richard Whittaker =

British surgeon and anatomist

Charles Richard Whittaker FRSE FRCSE FSA (Scot) RSA (Hon) (1879–1967) was a 20th-century British surgeon and anatomist. Remembered as a medical author, he illustrated his own anatomy texts.

== Life ==
He was born in 1879 in Lancashire.

He studied medicine and surgery at the Royal College of Physicians of Edinburgh and Royal College of Surgeons of Edinburgh.

In 1911 he became Senior Demonstrator at Surgeons' Hall in Edinburgh.

In 1911 he was elected a Fellow of the Royal Society of Edinburgh. His proposers were Sir James Alexander Russell, Sir David Berry Hart, Henry Harvey Littlejohn, and John Cameron. He was then living at 27 Hatton Place, a semi-detached Victorian villa in the Grange district of South Edinburgh.

In the First World War he served as a major in the Royal Army Medical Corps.

He began lecturing in anatomy at Surgeons Hall in 1931 and retired in 1951.

He died on 4 December 1967.

== Publications ==
- Hughes Nerves of the Human Body (1919)
- Operative Surgery (1921)
- Anatomy (1932)
- A Manual of Surgical Anatomy

== Artistic recognition ==
His portrait by David Foggie is held by the Scottish National Portrait Gallery.
