= Henry Draper (disambiguation) =

Henry Draper (1837–1882) was an American doctor and astronomer.

Henry Draper may also refer to:

- Henry Draper Catalogue, an astronomical catalogue of stars
- Henry Draper Medal, an astrophysics prize awarded by the National Academy of Sciences of the USA
- Henry Draper Observatory, a historical museum in the United States
- Draper (crater), a crater on the Moon named after the US astronomer Henry Draper
- The Henry Draper system, a system of stellar classification
- Henry Draper (umpire) (1847–1896), British cricket umpire
- Morrell Henry Draper (1921–2005) British scientist

== See also ==
- William Henry Draper (disambiguation)
