= The Grange, Edinburgh =

Suburb of Edinburgh, Scotland

Coordinates: 55°56′6.82″N 3°11′15.28″W

The Grange
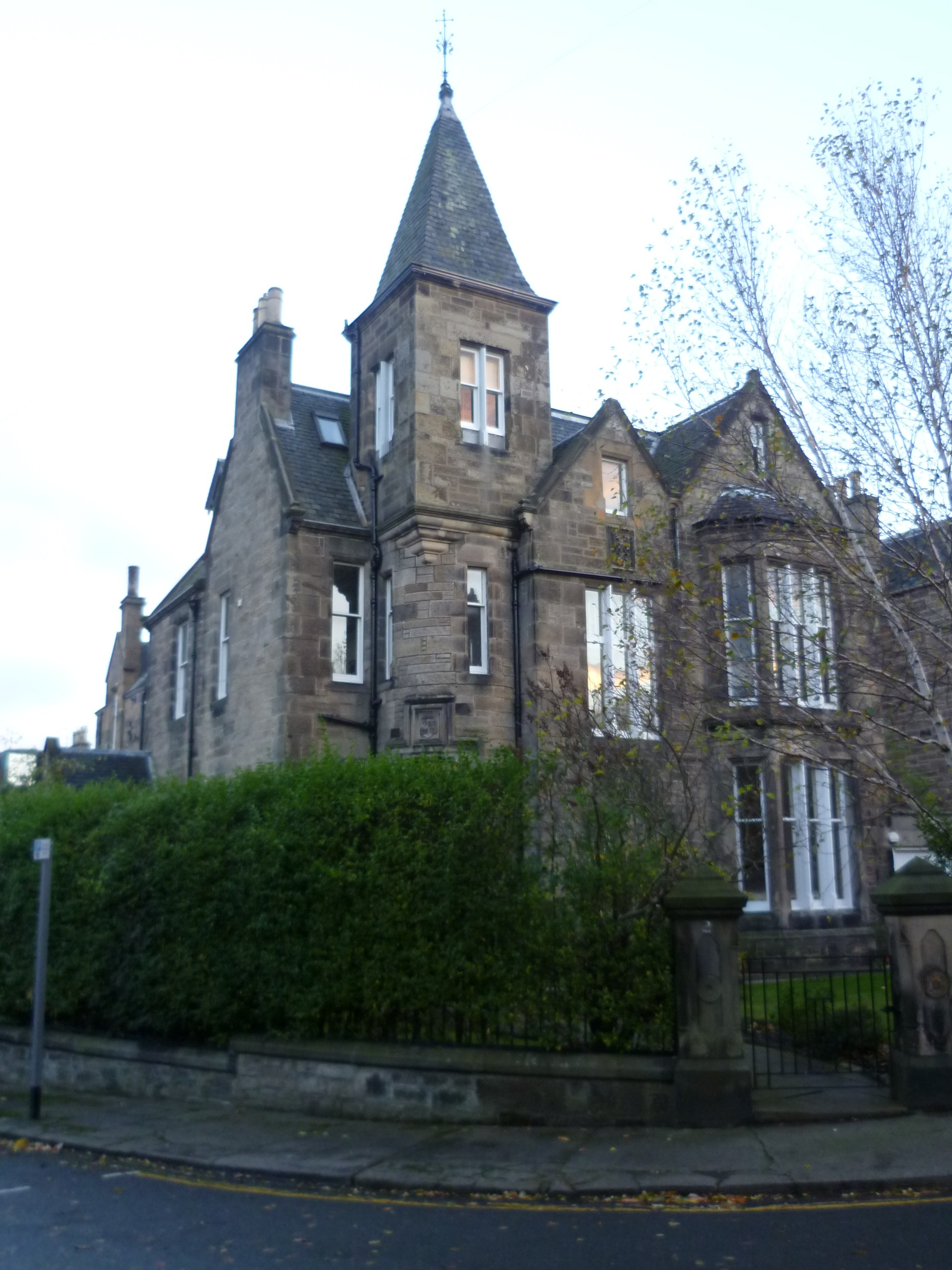
- Villa in The Grange

- Location within the City of Edinburgh council area Location within Scotland
- OS grid reference: NT260716
- Council area: City of Edinburgh
- Lieutenancy area: Edinburgh
- Country: Scotland
- Sovereign state: United Kingdom
- Post town: EDINBURGH
- Postcode district: EH9
- Dialling code: 0131
- Police: Scotland
- Fire: Scottish
- Ambulance: Scottish
- UK Parliament: Edinburgh South
- Scottish Parliament: Edinburgh Southern

An aerial view of The Grange

The Grange (originally St Giles' Grange) is an affluent suburb of Edinburgh, just south of the city centre, with Morningside and Greenhill to the west, Newington to the east, The Meadows park and Marchmont to the north, and Blackford Hill to the south. It is a conservation area characterised by large early Victorian stone-built villas and mansions, often with very large gardens. The Grange was built mainly between 1830 and 1890, and the area represented the idealisation of country living within an urban setting.

The suburb includes streets which are renowned for their pricey properties, and it is home to some of Scotland's richest people, top lawyers and businessmen. Whitehouse Terrace, in the Grange area of the Capital, was named as the priciest postcode in Zoopla's 'Rich List for 2021'.

== Character of the Area ==
The architectural form and green environment of The Grange are attributable to the picturesque movement and characterised by romantic revivalism of the architectural forms that are original and individual in composition. The buildings are complemented by the profusion of mature trees, spacious garden settings, stone boundary walls and green open spaces. A significant level of uniformity is achieved from the use of local building materials, e.g. local grey sandstone in ashlar or coursed rubble with hand carved decoration, Scots slates, timber framed sash and case windows with plate glass.

The Grange was predominantly developed around 1830, when the growing middle class of merchants and professionals in Edinburgh were looking for secluded location where to raise their families. The Grange had the advantages of physical separation from the overcrowded medieval city and offered individual dwellings in a predominantly suburban setting in contrast to the tenements of the Georgian New Town. Houses were built with their own private gardens surrounded by high stone walls; this was in contrast with the communal living of the more central areas. Each house has its individual fashionable style of the Victorian times. The outstanding quality of many of the villas is due to the insistence of the Dick Lauder family, who commissioned the houses, on high architectural standards.

== Superiors ==
There are mentions of 'Sanct-Geill-Grange' in charters of David I and King Edgar, as church lands attached to St. Giles parish church in Edinburgh, the king retaining the superiority. The word grange is common across Britain and normally links to an extensive farm with a central mansionhouse. On 16 June 1376, King Robert II granted the superiority of the barony and lands of St Giles to his eldest son, John, Earl of Carrick, Steward of Scotland. In 1391 the estate was conferred upon the Wardlaw family.

On 29 October 1506, St Giles Grange passed to John Cant, a Burgess of Edinburgh, and his spouse Agnes Carkettle, and in 1517 they granted the use of 18 acres (73,000 m^{2}) of land to the nuns of St. Catherine of Siena. On 19 March 1691 a John Cant sold St Giles Grange in its entirety to William Dick. At that time, the 18 acres (73,000 m^{2}) previously feued to the nuns was now in the possession of Sir John Napier, the famous inventor of logarithms. When Isabel Dick, the heiress, married Sir Andrew Lauder, 5th Baronet of Fountainhall, in 1731, The Grange passed to him.

== Grange House ==
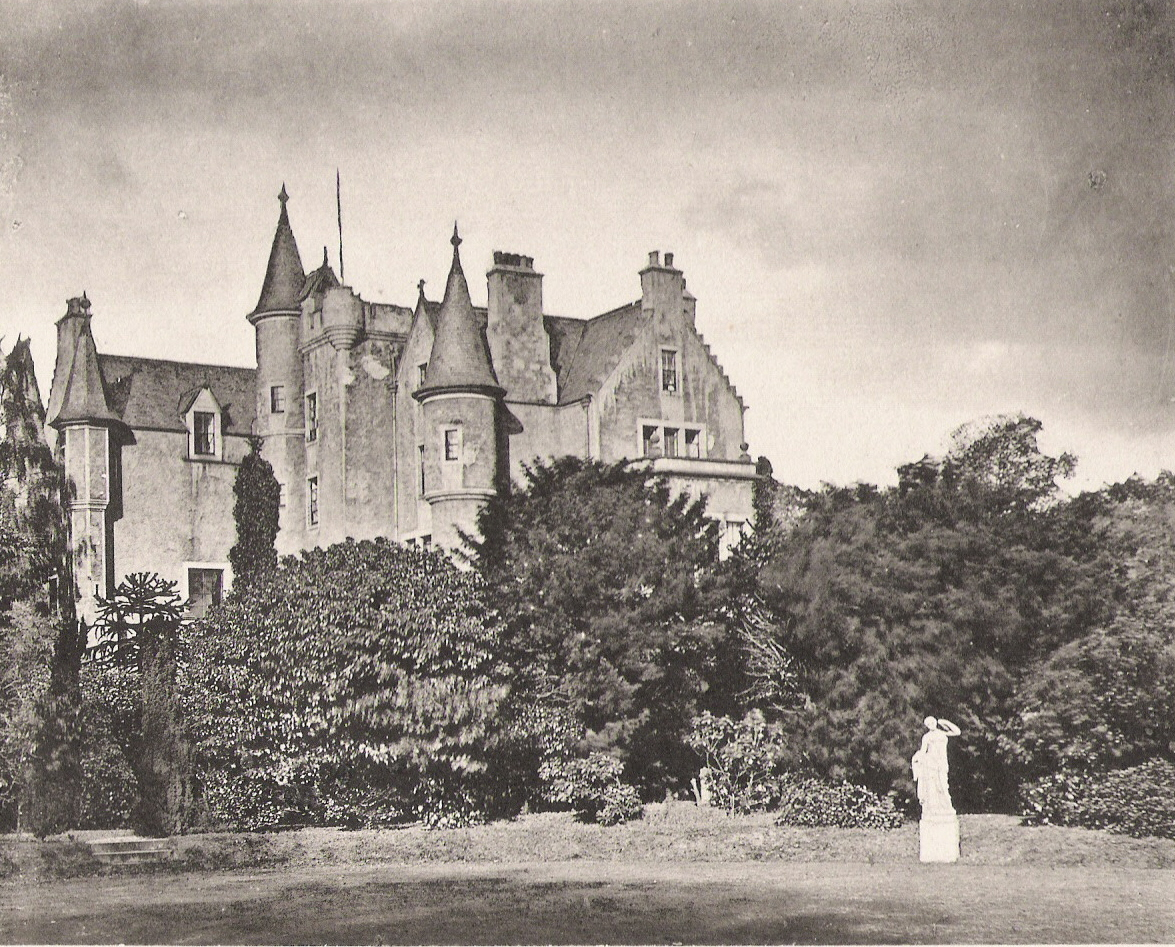
Grange House, 1897

The original tower house appears to be of a very early date, possibly the 13th century, ornamented with two turrets and a battlemented roof; its position was isolated at the eastern end of the Burgh Muir, which at that time consisted of waste tracts of moorland and morass, stretching out southward as far as the Braid Hills and eastward to St. Leonard's Crags.

The mansion, The Grange House, was enlarged over the centuries, a major restoration being carried out by Sir Thomas Dick Lauder, Bt. On 16 May 1836, Lord Cockburn recorded in his diary: "There was an annular eclipse of the sun yesterday afternoon....it was a beautiful spectacle......I was on the top of the tower at The Grange House, with Sir Thomas Dick Lauder and his family."

After Sir Thomas's death in 1848, the fabric of the house gradually deteriorated, and by the 1930s the cost of maintenance and preservation had become prohibitive. Despite widespread protests, the house was demolished in 1936. Bungalows and other houses were built on part of the site, in what is now Grange Crescent.

Stone wyverns from its gateposts, known locally as the 'Lauder griffins', were re-erected in Grange Loan. One was placed at the entrance to a stretch of Lover's Loan, a centuries-old path which was preserved in a late 19th-century redevelopment and is marked out with high stone walls separating it from the gardens on either side. At one point the path borders the Grange Cemetery, where various well-known people are buried, including Sir Thomas Dick Lauder, Hugh Miller, and Thomas Chalmers.

== City expansion ==
In 1825 Thomas Dick Lauder, the then owner of the Grange, sold off a large area of land for development (the area between the present Dick Place and Grange Road). This linked to a new access road to the east (now called Newington Road). Lauder controlled development of the land through a strong feuing plan and developments required his approval. The original feuing plan included curious plot names such as Little Transylvania and Greater Transylvania (both north of Grange Loan). Grange House remained in a large plot in the centre of Grange Loan.

From the 1840s, The Grange was developed as an early suburb, built gradually upon the lands of The Grange estate — still owned by the Dick Lauder family. The area was originally laid out by the architect David Cousin but then the feuing was altered (1858) and greatly extended southwards (1877, following great success) by the architect Robert Reid Raeburn.

Some of the Victorian villas still retain substantial mature trees and gardens which pre-date the housing. In 1835 Earl Grey (of Reform Bill fame) stayed with Sir Thomas Dick Lauder at The Grange House, and commemorated his visit by planting an oak tree in a conspicuous spot in The Avenue, upon the bank of the north side, not very far from the ivy-clad arch. It was called 'Earl Grey's Oak' and was still healthy in 1898. It is not known if it has survived.

Within the area lies the campus of the Astley Ainslie Hospital. This large area of ground was gifted as a hospital in 1921 as part of the will of John Ainslie.

The grounds of the Carlton Cricket Club is the last vestige of the major open space which used to surround Grange House.

== Grange Cemetery ==
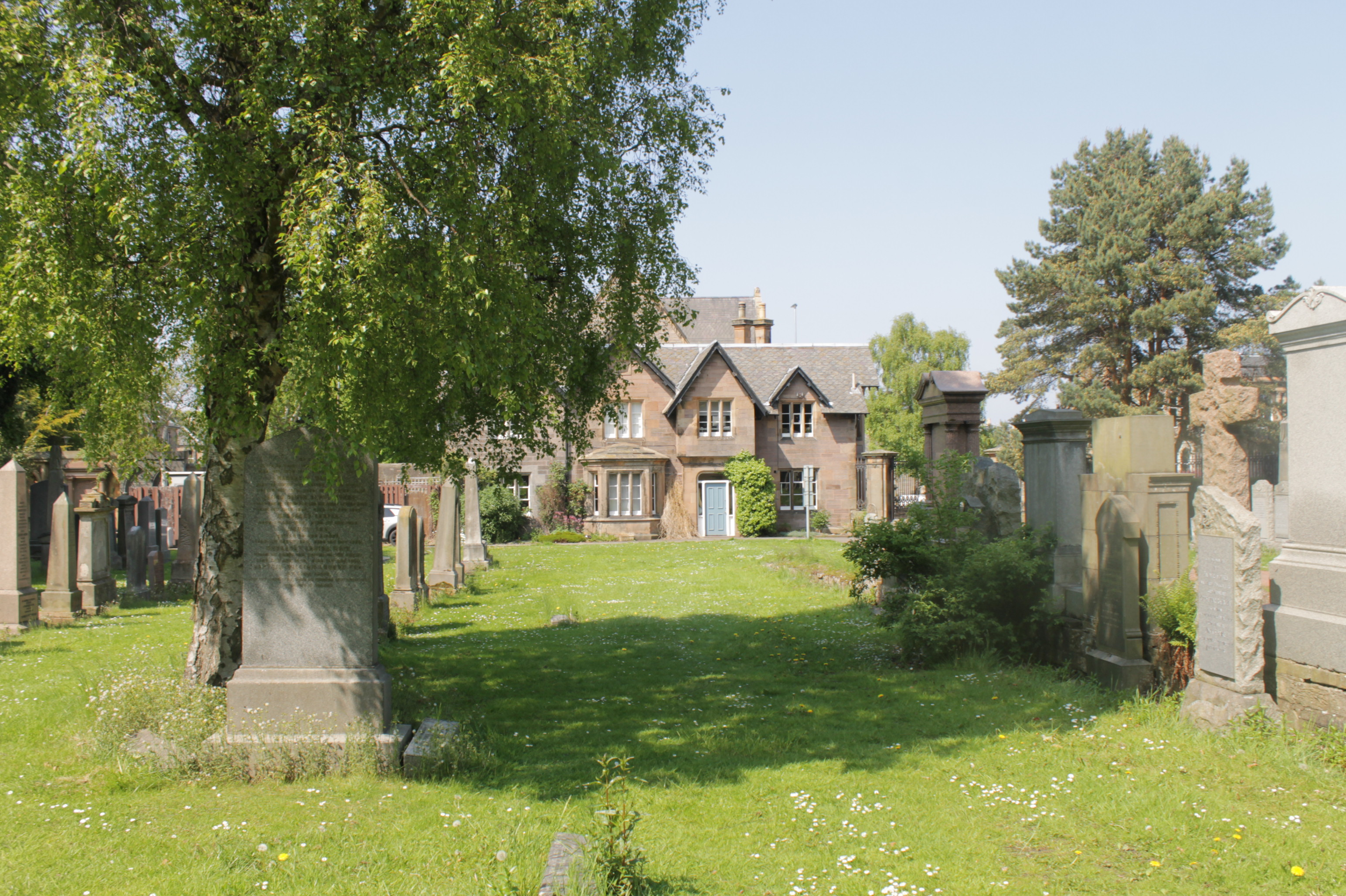
Grange Cemetery viewing to entrance lodge

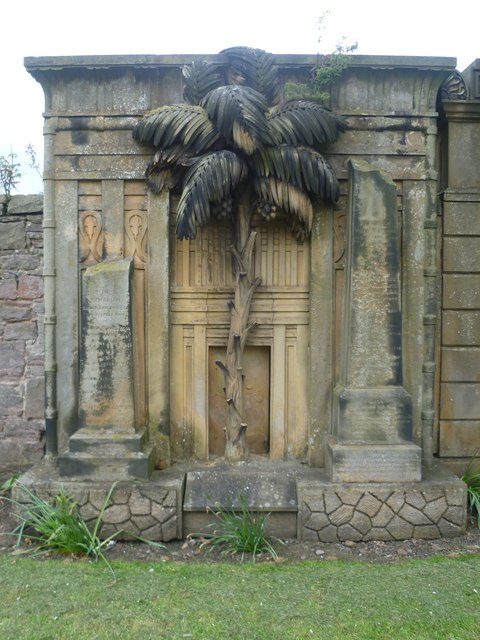
"Egyptian" tombstone sculpture, Grange Cemetery

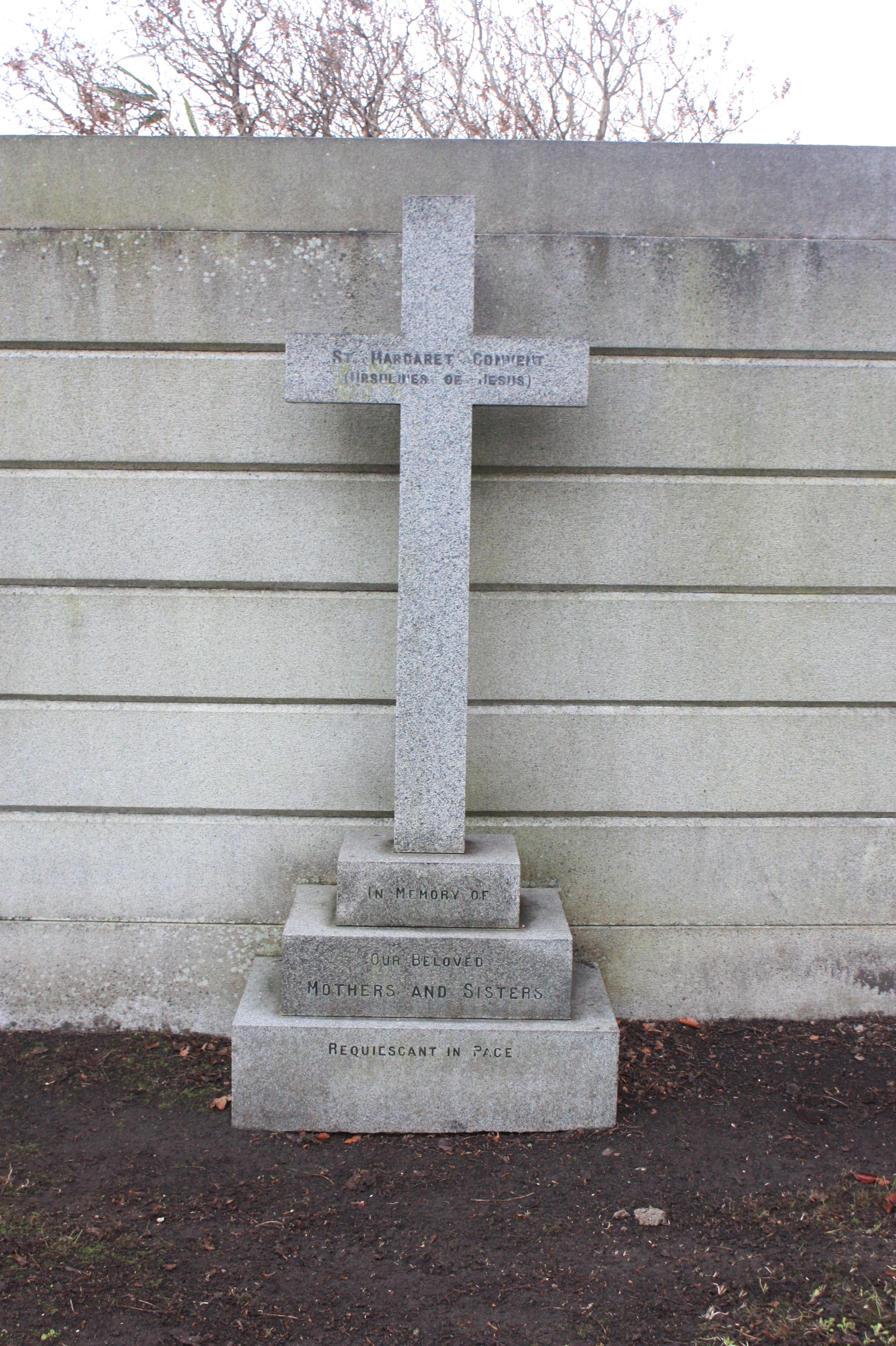
The communal grave of the nuns of St Margaret's Convent, Grange Cemetery, Edinburgh

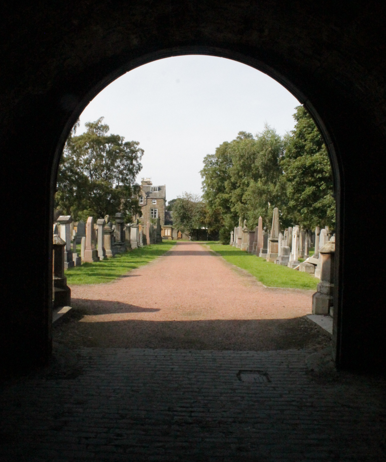
Looking northwards from within the catacombs in Grange Cemetery

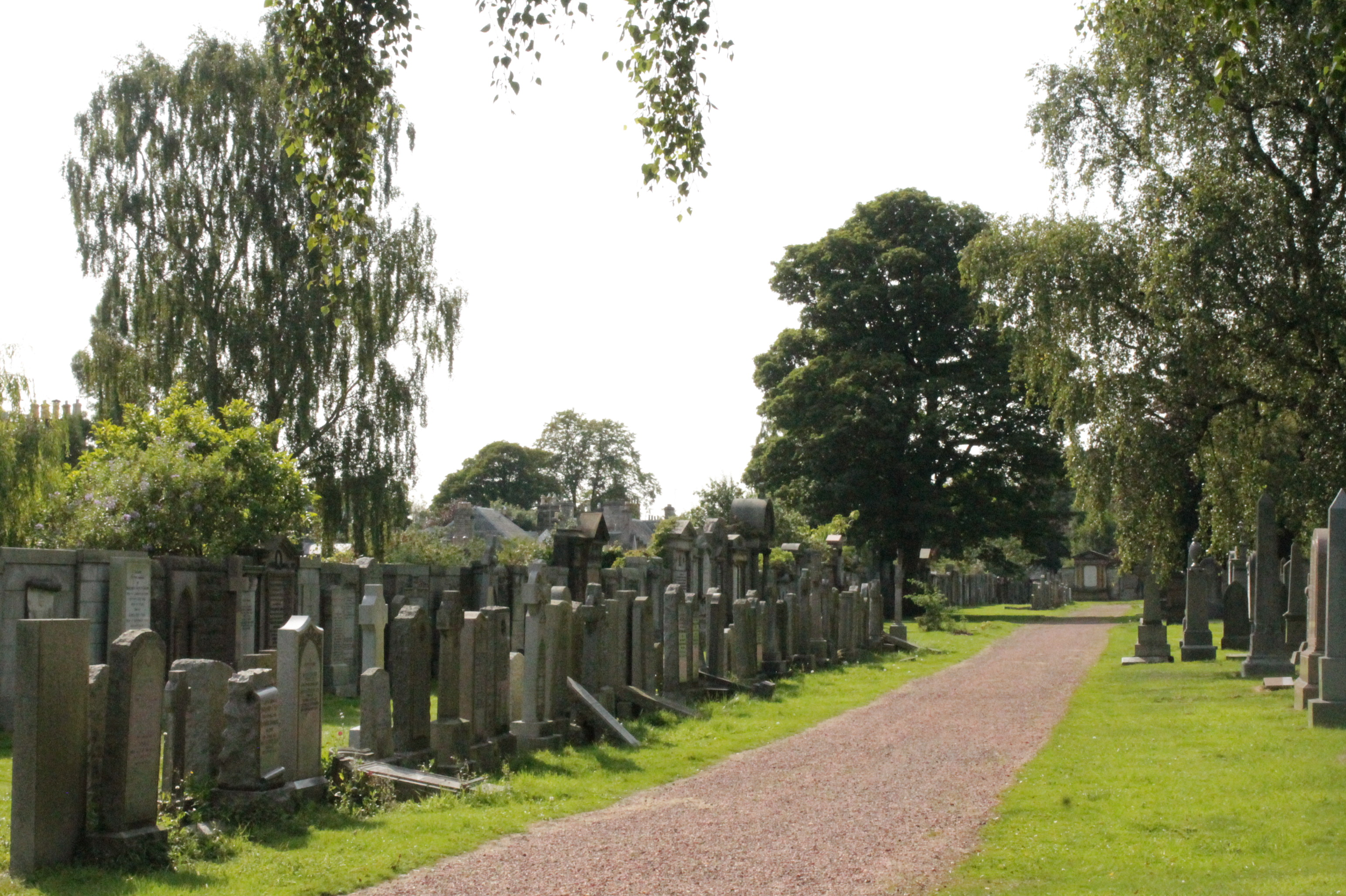
The south path in Grange Cemetery

This was laid out in 1847 by the Edinburgh architect David Bryce and is more rectilinear in layout than its predecessors, Warriston Cemetery and Dean Cemetery. It was original entitled the Southern Edinburgh Cemetery.

It includes a very interesting "Egyptian portal" to the land of the dead for the wife of a William Stuart (died 1868) on the north wall, by the sculptor Robert Thomson. Sculptures by William Birnie Rhind (Dr. James Cappie) and Henry Snell Gamley (David Menzies) can also be found. There are also multiple ornate Celtic crosses, mainly by Stewart McGlashan. The graves of Isabella Russell and Margaret McNicoll were designed by Robert Lorimer in 1904. Other notable graves include:

- John Brown Abercromby (1843–1929), artist
- Harry Burrows Acton (1908–1974)
- Prof David Laird Adams
- Sir Andrew Agnew, 7th Baronet
- Thomas Croxen Archer (1817–1885) botanist
- Rev William Arnot
- Rev David Arnot DD minister of St Giles Cathedral
- Sir William James and Sir James Gardiner Baird, 7th and 8th Baronets of Saughton Hall
- Very Rev John Baillie, Moderator of the General Assembly of the Church of Scotland, 1943–44
- Sir Andrew Balfour, physician (grave vandalised)
- James Bannerman (theologian) and his son William Burney Bannerman and his wife Helen Bannerman
- John Bartholomew, Sr. and John Bartholomew Jr., mapmakers
- John Begg, architect
- Alexander Montgomerie Bell, lawyer
- Henry McGrady Bell (1880–1958) traveller, diplomat and author
- Sir Robert Duncan Bell (1878–1935) senior civil servant in the Indian Raj
- George Bertram, engineer and paper-maker
- Benjamin Blyth, engineer
- Robert Henry Bow FRSE (1827–1909) photographic pioneer and civil engineer
- Hugh Wylie Brown FRSE, actuary
- Very Rev John Brown, Moderator of the General Assembly of the Church of Scotland in 1916 (his memorial also marks 4 sons lost in WWI)
- George Washington Browne, architect
- Viscount Bryce, lawyer, historian, academic and politician
- James Bryce (geologist) and his son John Annan Bryce, MP for Inverness Burghs
- William Moir Bryce LLD (1842–1919) antiquarian
- Rev James Buchanan
- Rev Dr Thomas Burns (1853–1938) founder of the Thomas Burns Homes
- Sir John Alexander Calder
- Edward Calvert (architect)
- Hugh Cameron RSA (1835–1918) artist
- James Roderick Johnston Cameron, author, President of the Royal College of Surgeons of Edinburgh
- Rev W. J. Cameron (d. 1990) twice Moderator of the General Assembly to the Free Church of Scotland
- Dr John Henry Campbell, monument by John Hutchison RSA
- John Irvine Carswell FRSE engineer
- Dr Thomas Chalmers
- Elizabeth Chantrelle (née Dyer) murdered by her husband Eugene Chantrelle
- Alexander Christie (1792–1872) of the Hudon's Bay Company
- Dugald Christie (missionary)
- Very Rev Dr Patrick Clason (1789–1867) Moderator of the General Assembly of the Free Church of Scotland 1848–49
- Rev Prof G. N. M. Collins twice Moderator of the General Assembly of the Free Church of Scotland (NW)
- Robin Cook, Labour Foreign Secretary
- Prof W. M. Court-Brown (1918–1968) radiologist and medical author
- Alexander Cowan papermaker and philanthropist, with his son James, Lord Provost of Edinburgh and MP for Edinburgh
- Sir John Cowan LLD (1844–1929) steel merchant and his son Andrew Wallace Cowan FRSA and missionary daughter Agnes Marshall Cowan holder of the first Scottish female professorship
- Sir Robert Cranston
- John Croall of Southfield (d. 1871) founder of the Croall Lectures
- Rear Admiral Octavius Cumberland (1813–1877)
- Rev Prof William Cunningham
- Walter Scott Dalgleish (1834–1897), author
- Prof Andrew B. Davidson
- William Soltau Davidson (1846–1924) pioneer of refrigerated shipping
- Lt Col Lewis Merson Davies, geologist and anti-evolutionist
- The Dick Lauder baronets
- William Kirk Dickson and his son, Rear Admiral Robert Kirk Dickson
- Alexander Graham Donald FRSE FSA FFA (d. 1941) actuary
- Greta Douglas (1891–1982) artist
- Morrell Draper FRSE, Australian-born toxicologist (NW)
- Rev Dr Robert James Drummond, Moderator of the General Assembly of the UF Church in 1918
- Rev Alexander Duff (missionary)
- Rev Prof John Duncan (theologian)
- Rev Patrick Fairbairn
- Charles Hamilton Fasson (1821–1892) senior surgeon during the Indian Mutiny and later Superintendent of both the old Edinburgh Infirmary and the new (1879) Edinburgh Royal Infirmary
- Prof Kenneth Fearon (1960–2016) cancer specialist
- Prof Robert McNair Ferguson LLD (1829–1912) mathematician
- Rev Thomas Finlayson
- Robert Flockhart (1778–1857) street preacher
- Rev William Galbraith (mathematician)
- Rev James Gall astronomer and founder of Carrubbers Close Mission
- William Galloway (architectural historian) (1830–897) early conservation architect and historian
- Dr Jessie Gellatly MD (1882–1935) one of Britain's first female doctors
- Archibald H. R. Goldie, FRSE, meteorologist
- Esme Gordon (1934–1993) architect
- Giles Alexander Esme Gordon
- Sir James Gowans (memorial of his own design)
- General James Hope Grant
- Alan William Greenwood FRSE, zoologist
- David Grieve FRSE PRPSE, geologist
- Edward Graham Guest (d. 1962) of McVities Guest
- John William Gulland MP and his nephew, John Masson Gulland FRS FRSE, chemist
- William Maxwell Gunn LLD (1795–1851) author
- Dr Thomas Guthrie
- Robert Halliday Gunning, surgeon and philanthropist
- Henry Haig (engraver) (1795–1848)
- Rev William Hanna (1808–1882)
- Canon Edward Joseph Hannan, co-founder of Hibernian Football Club
- Admiral John Hay (1804–1899)
- George Henderson (architect) (1846–1905)
- John Henderson (architect) (1804–1862)
- Prof William Henderson (physician and homeopath)
- Robert Herdman RSA, Victorian artist
- Rev William Maxwell Hetherington (stone carved by John Rhind)
- William Ballantyne Hodgson
- William Hole (artist)... (buried in the ground of James Lindsay WS)
- The Home baronets, John (1872–1938, 12th Baronet of Blackadder) and David George (1904–1992, 13th Baronet of Blackadder)
- John Hutchison (sculptor)
- Lady Isabel Emslie Hutton (1887–1960) physician
- Prof Ainsley Iggo FRS (1924–2012)
- David Irving (librarian)
- James Jamieson (dentist) FRSE
- Alexander Keith Johnston (1804–1871) geographer (also memorialising his son of the same name, an African explorer).
- Christian Isobel Johnstone (1781–1857) author, journalist and feminist
- General Sir Gordon Jolly KCIE (1886–1962)
- Prof Arthur Berriedale Keith
- David Kennedy (1825–1886) Scottish singer (subject of a monument at the foot of Calton Hill) plus his daughter Marjory Kennedy-Fraser
- Major Allan Ker VC (1883–1958) WW1 Victoria Cross recipient (memorialised on grave of Robert Darling Ker WS)
- William Joseph Kinloch-Anderson (1846–1901) founder of the kilt-making company which bears his name
- John Kinross (architect)
- Thomas Knox (1818–1879) bronze portrait by Alexander Rhind
- Thomas Dick Lauder, author and landowner
- Prof Simon Somerville Laurie, educator
- Robert Lawson FRSE, physician (1846–1896)
- Rev Prof Robert Lee DD FRSE theologian (sculpted by John Hutchison)
- David Lees FRSE (1881–1934) public health expert
- William Lennie (1779–1852) grammarian
- Rev Mary Levison DD (1923–2011) (née Mary Irene Lusk), first ordained female minister in the Church of Scotland
- Prof David Liston (1799–1881) Professor of Hebrew
- Rev Prof Peter Lorimer (1812–1879) Moderator of the English Presbyterian Synod
- David Fowler Lowe FRSE LLD (1843–1924, Headmaster of George Heriot's School
- Lt David Lyell, Royal Scots (d. 1915) survivor of the Gretna Rail Disaster who was killed two months later at Gallipoli (cenotaph)
- Major General William McBean VC (1818–1878) winner of the Victoria Cross at the Siege of Lucknow
- Sir George McCrae (politician) (1860–1928)
- Very Rev William J. G. McDonald (1924–2015) Moderator of the General Assembly of the Church of Scotland in 1989, presenter on radio's Thought for the Day
- Very Rev James MacGregor DD (1834–1910) Moderator of the General Assembly of the Church of Scotland 1891
- Very Rev Mackintosh MacKay (1793–1873) Moderator of the General Assembly of the Free Church of Scotland in 1849 (cenotaph – buried in Duddingston Kirkyard)
- Lieutenant General Colin Mackenzie, (1806–1881), Scottish officer in the Indian Army
- Paul MacKenzie (physician) (1919–2015) soldier and sportsman
- James MacKillop, MP
- Meta Maclean, author
- John Macleod (theologian)
- Charles Maclaren, founder and editor of the Scotsman newspaper
- Very Rev Thomas McLauchlan (1815–1886) Moderator of the General Assembly of the church of Scotland in 1876
- Hector C. Macpherson FRSE author and journalist
- Sir Alexander Charles Gibson Maitland
- John Maitland (accountant) (1803–1865) Accountant to the Court of Session and Disruption Worthy
- Charles Alexander Malcolm, historian and author
- Rev Prof William Manson, theologian
- Hugh Marshall FRS FRSE (1868–1913) chemist
- Rev Dr Hugh Martin, theologian
- David Masson historian and his daughters Rosaline Masson and Flora Masson
- David Mekie, geographer and his son, Prof D. E. C. Mekie OBE FRSE surgeon
- Cenotaph to Wiliam Babington Melville, killed in the Manipur Massacre of 1891
- Duncan Menzies (1837–1910) architect and engineer
- John Millar, Lord Craighill (1817–1888)
- Hugh Miller (pioneer geologist) and his son Hugh Miller FRSE
- Prof James Miller FRSE (1812–1864)
- Rev Dr William Milligan (1821–1893)
- William Beatton Moonie (1883–1961) composer
- Sir Henry Moncreiff, 2nd Baron Moncreiff (1840-1909), with a sculpture of his wife "Minna" on the stone
- Robert Morham, architect
- John Muir (indologist)
- Sir Andrew Mure (1826–1909) judge
- Duncan Napier, herbalist
- James Napier (chemist)
- Thomas Nelson (publisher) and his son Thomas Nelson (1822–1892)
- John Pringle Nichol, astronomer, and his wife Elizabeth Pease Nichol
- Rev Dr Maxwell Nicholson DD, author, minister of Tron Kirk and then St Stephen's
- Prof James Nicol, geologist
- Very Rev Prof Thomas Nicol DD, theological author, Moderator of the General Assembly of the Church of Scotland 1914
- Frederick Niecks, musical scholar
- John Nisbet, artist, with his 3 wives
- Pollock Sinclair Nisbet, artist
- Robert Buchan Nisbet, artist
- Rev Prof John Cochrane O'Neill (1930–2003) theological author
- Thomas Oliver, co-founder of Oliver & Boyd
- Emily Rosaline Orme (1835–1915)
- George Ann Panton FRSE (1842–1903), actuary, botanist and geologist, Fellow of the Royal Society of Edinburgh
- Sir Edward Parrott politician
- Aileen Paterson (1934–2018) children's author, creator of "Maisie of Morningside" (NW)
- Robert Paterson (1825–1889) architect
- Waller Hugh Paton RSA, artist
- Very Rev David Paul DD LLD FLS, Moderator of the General Assembly of the Church of Scotland in 1915
- Very Rev Adam Philip Moderator of the General Assembly of the United Free Church of Scotland in 1921.
- Sir Robert William Philip, pioneer of tuberculosis, younger brother of Adam Philip
- Very Rev K. M. Phin (1816–1888) Moderator of the General Assembly of the Church of Scotland 1877
- James Ramage, artist (1824–1887)
- James Reed, engineer FRSE engineer
- Very Rev George T. H. Reid MC DD (1910–1990) Moderator of the General Assembly of the Church of Scotland in 1973
- Rev Prof Alexander Macdonald Renwick DD, theological author, Moderator of the General Assembly of the Free Church of Scotland in 1931
- John Thomas Rochead, architect of the Wallace Monument
- Rev Dr Charles Rogers DD LLD, minister and author
- Sir Hugh Arthur Rose and his son, Sir Hugh Rose (owners of Rose's lime juice)
- Lt Gen James Kerr Ross (1792–1872) wounded at the Battle of Waterloo
- Frederick Schenck, lithographer
- Dr Robert Edmund Scoresby-Jackson FRSE physician and biographer
- Sir Thomas Drummond Shiels MP
- Sir Alexander Russell Simpson and his sons, Prof James Young Simpson (scientist) and Dr George Freeland Barbour Simpson
- Dr David Skae (1814–1873) psychiatrist
- Sir William Lowrie Sleigh, Lord Provost of Edinburgh 1923–6
- Prof George Smeaton
- George Smith (1833–1919) colonial educator and writer on Indian matters
- George Smith RSA (1870–1934) artist
- Very Rev Prof Thomas Smith (1817–1906) missionary, mathematician, Moderator of the Free Church 1891–92
- Dr James Spence (1812–1882) President of the Royal College of Surgeons of Edinburgh
- Robert Cunningham Graham Spiers FRSE (1797–1847) Sheriff of Edinburgh (on the grave he is called "Graham Speirs")
- The sculptor brothers David Watson Stevenson and William Grant Stevenson buried together
- Dr Norman Lang Stevenson (1875–1967) cricketer and 1908 Olympic Bronze Medallist for Scotland at field hockey
- Jane Taylor and her daughter Mary Jane Pritchard, both poisoned in 1865 by Edward William Pritchard
- Rev William King Tweedie DD (1803–1864) religious author and his son, Major General William Tweedie of the Sepoy mutiny
- James Thin (1824–1915), founder of a renowned Edinburgh bookshop
- Surgeon Major General Peter Stephenson Turnbull (1836–1921)
- Andrew Usher
- Sir John Usher, Baronet
- Major General Thomas Valiant (1784–1845) (cenotaph)
- Rev Dr James Veitch (1808–1879)
- Cecil Voge FRSE (1898–1978) chemist
- Sir George Warrender of Lochend, 6th Baronet (after whom the Warrender section of Marchmont is named)
- George Mackie Watson (1860–1948) architect
- Rev Robert Boog Watson (1823–1910), scientist
- David Monro Westland, architect/engineer (creator of the North Bridge)
- Prof Charles Richard Whittaker FRSE (1879–1967) anatomist
- Dr Dionysius Wielobycki (1813–1882) early homeopathic doctor
- Harry Martin Willsher, author
- Robert Wilson architect of the Edinburgh Board Schools
- Robert Wilson (1871–1928) editor of the Edinburgh Evening News and donor of the Wilson Cup
- Sir James Lawton Wingate (artist)
- Sir Alexander Kemp Wright (1859–1933), banker co-founder of the National Savings movement
- Prof David F. Wright (1937–2008), historian
- Robert Stodart Wyld LLD (1808–1893) historian
- Robert Young (biblical scholar)

There are war graves of 40 Commonwealth service personnel of both World Wars and a communal grave for the nuns of St Margaret's Convent.

== Notable residents ==
Residents of the suburb have included the former CEO of RBS, Fred Goodwin. Goodwin relocated from The Grange after the vandalism to which his property there was subjected but has since returned after his wife's throwing him out of their family home in Colinton due to revelations of his marital infidelity.

Oil tycoon Sir Bill Gammell, an old school friend of Tony Blair and who had George W Bush as a wedding guest, purchased property in The Grange.

Other notable residents of The Grange include writer D. M. Macalister (1832–1909) who was a renowned minister of the Free Church of Scotland and served as Moderator of the General Assembly in 1902–03. In 1900 he was living at 32 Mansionhouse Road.

Max Born, Nobel Laureate and former Tait Professor of Natural Philosophy at the University of Edinburgh lived at 84 Grange Loan. Born came to Edinburgh in 1936. He stayed until his retirement in 1952. He is recognised as one of the founders of the field of quantum mechanics. He was awarded the Nobel Prize in Physics in 1954 for fundamental research in quantum mechanics.

Marc-André Raffalovich (1864–1934) was a wealthy French poet, writer and defender of homosexuality, best known today for his patronage of the arts and for his lifelong relationship with the poet John Gray. Raffalovich lived at 9 Whitehouse Terrace, and his most important supporter and romantic partner John Gray also lived nearby. The two remained together until Raffalovich's sudden death in 1934. A devastated Gray died exactly four months later. Raffalovich's exposition of the view that a homosexual orientation is both natural and morally neutral was a notable contribution to the late 19th century literature on the subject.

Francis H. Underwood was an American editor and writer. He was the founder and first associate editor of The Atlantic Monthly in 1857 while still working as a publisher's assistant. He lived at 35 Mansionhouse Road.

William Henry Goold (1815–1897) was a Scottish minister of both the Reformed Presbyterian Church and the Free Church of Scotland who served as Moderator of the General Assembly of the Free Church 1877–78. He lived at 28 Mansionhouse Road.

David Patrick (writer) FRSE LLD (1849–1914) was a Scottish writer and editor. He edited Chambers's Encyclopaedia from 1888 to 1892,[1] Chambers's Biographical Dictionary in 1897 and Chambers's Cyclopaedia of English Literature with F. H. Groome from 1901 to 1903. He lived at 20 Mansionhouse Road.

George Smeaton (1814–1889) was a 19th-century Scottish theologian and Greek scholar. He lived at 13 South Mansionhouse Road.

John Duns (minister) FRSE (1820–1909) was Professor of Natural Science at New College, Edinburgh. He was a prolific author on both scientific and religious topics. He lived at 4 North Mansionhouse Road.

Thomas Smith (missionary) (1817–1906) was a Scottish missionary and mathematician who was instrumental in establishing India's zenana missions in 1854. He served as Moderator of the General Assembly of the Free Church of Scotland 1891–92. He lived at 10 Mansionhouse Road.

Frederick Hallard FRSE PRSSA (1821–1882) was a Scottish advocate and legal author. He served as senior Sheriff-Substitute for Midlothian 1855 to 1882 and was Director of the Edinburgh Philosophical Institution and President of the Royal Scottish Society of Arts. He lived at 7 Whitehouse Terrace.

George Washington Browne (1853–1939) was a Scottish architect who designed Edinburgh's Central Library and the Royal Hospital for Sick Children. From approximately 1896 to 1914, he lived in a house in Blackford Road that he designed for himself and his family.

Dame Elizabeth Blackadder (1931–2021), artist and printmaker, lived in Fountainhall Road with her husband John Houston from the 1950s until her death in 2021.

Kate Atkinson, writer of novels, plays and short stories, currently lives in Grange.

Sir James Purves-Stewart was born on 20 November 1869, the son of a master tailor in Edinburgh. He was educated at the city's Royal High School and he studied at the universities of Edinburgh and Jena, graduating from Edinburgh with the degrees of M.A., and M.D. in 1894. The family lived in Mansionhouse Road having relocated from George Street, Edinburgh.

William Lorn Cowie, Senator of the College of Justice, lives in Grange Loan.

== Filming location ==
The Grange was a principal filming location for the BBC Three comedy drama Pramface, which starred Scarlett Alice Johnson and Sean Michael Vereyoles.
