= Thomas Finlayson =

Thomas Finlayson may refer to:

- Tommy Finlayson (Thomas James Finlayson, born 1938), Gibraltarian historian
- Thomas Finlayson (Presbyterian minister) (1809–1872), Scottish Presbyterian minister
