= George Ann Panton =

Scottish merchant and amateur botanist and geologist (1842–1903

- Born: 24 April 1842; Edinburgh, Scotland
- Died: 28 January 1903 (aged 60)
- Burial place: Grange Cemetery
- Occupation: Geologist & Botanist

George Ann Panton FRSE (24 April 1842–28 January 1903) was a 19th-century Scottish merchant and noted amateur botanist and geologist. In later life he was an actuary by trade with links to Birmingham.

== Early life ==
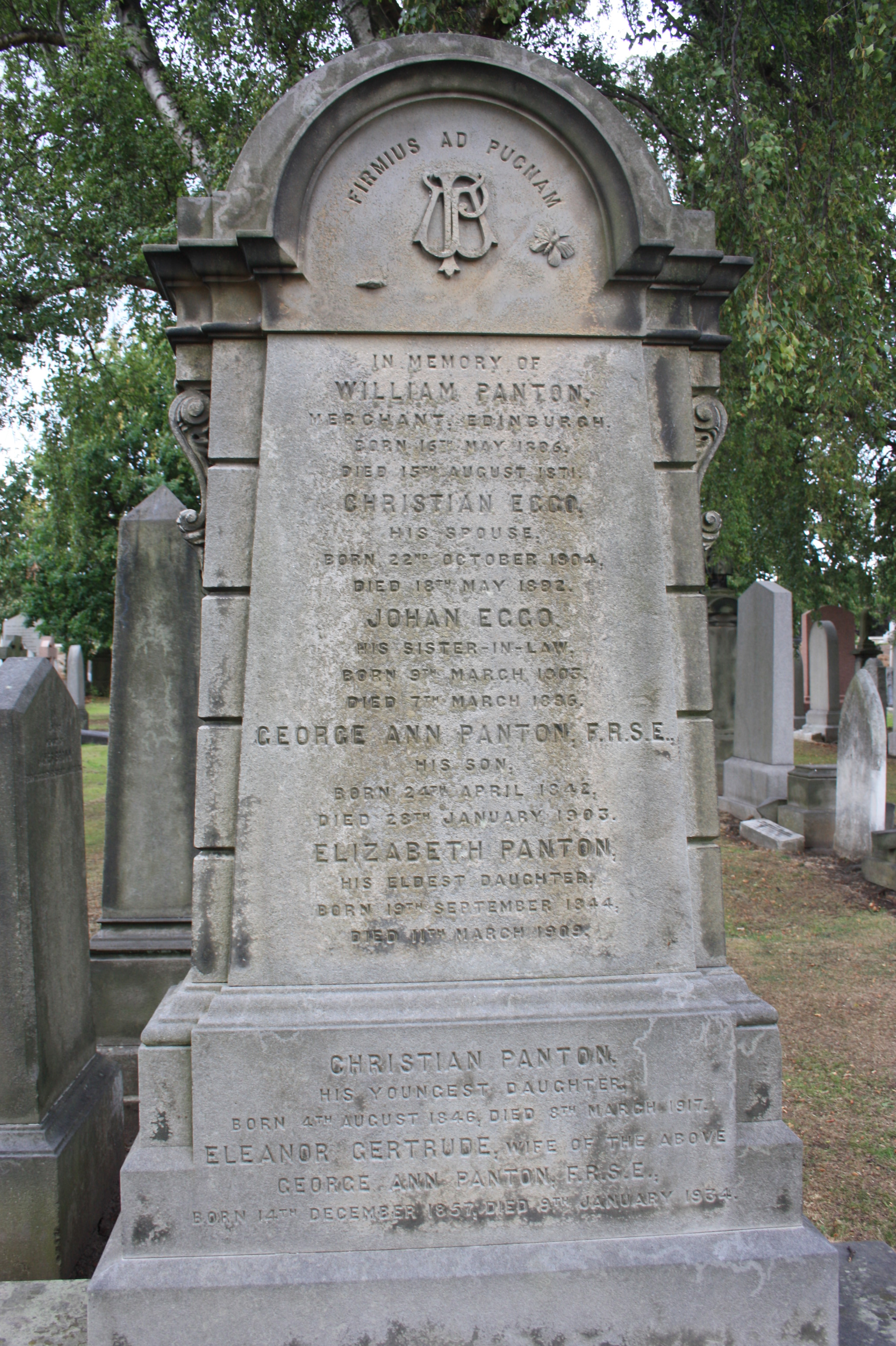
The grave of George Ann Panton, Grange Cemetery, Edinburgh

He was born in Edinburgh on 24 April 1842, the son of William Panton and his wife Christian Eggo. He was grandson of his namesake, George Ann Panton. His uncle was also George Ann Panton, who became a minister in the Free Church of Scotland in Glasgow and also ran a school for young ladies.

His family moved to Edinburgh in the mid 19th century and his father was a partner in Panton & Young, hatters and clothiers at 35/36 South Bridge and living at 31 Hope Terrace in the Grange. In 1863 he is listed as a member of the Botanical Society of Edinburgh and was living at 31 Gayfield Square at the top of Leith Walk.

He inherited the house on his father's death. In the 1870s he is listed as Director of the English and Scottish Life Assurance Association and as Secretary of the Edinburgh Geological Society.

In 1872 he is also listed as a hop merchant.

In 1877 he was elected a Fellow of the Royal Society of Edinburgh. His proposers were Sir Charles Wyville Thomson, Archibald Geikie, John Hutton Balfour and Alexander Buchan. He was President of the Botanical Society of Edinburgh.

His wife lived alone at 19 Leamington Terrace for several years before his death. He appears to have lived independently at 95 Colmore Row in Birmingham in his later life, where he was a member of the Birmingham Botanical Society.

He died on 28 January 1903. He is buried in the Grange Cemetery in south Edinburgh with his parents and family. The grave lies in the main south-west section facing onto the south path.

== Family ==
He was married in 1882 to Eleanor Gertrude Lowe, of Edgbaston, Warwickshire.

They had at least three sons (William, Henry and Tom).
