= Robert Henry Bow =

Scottish civil engineer and photographer

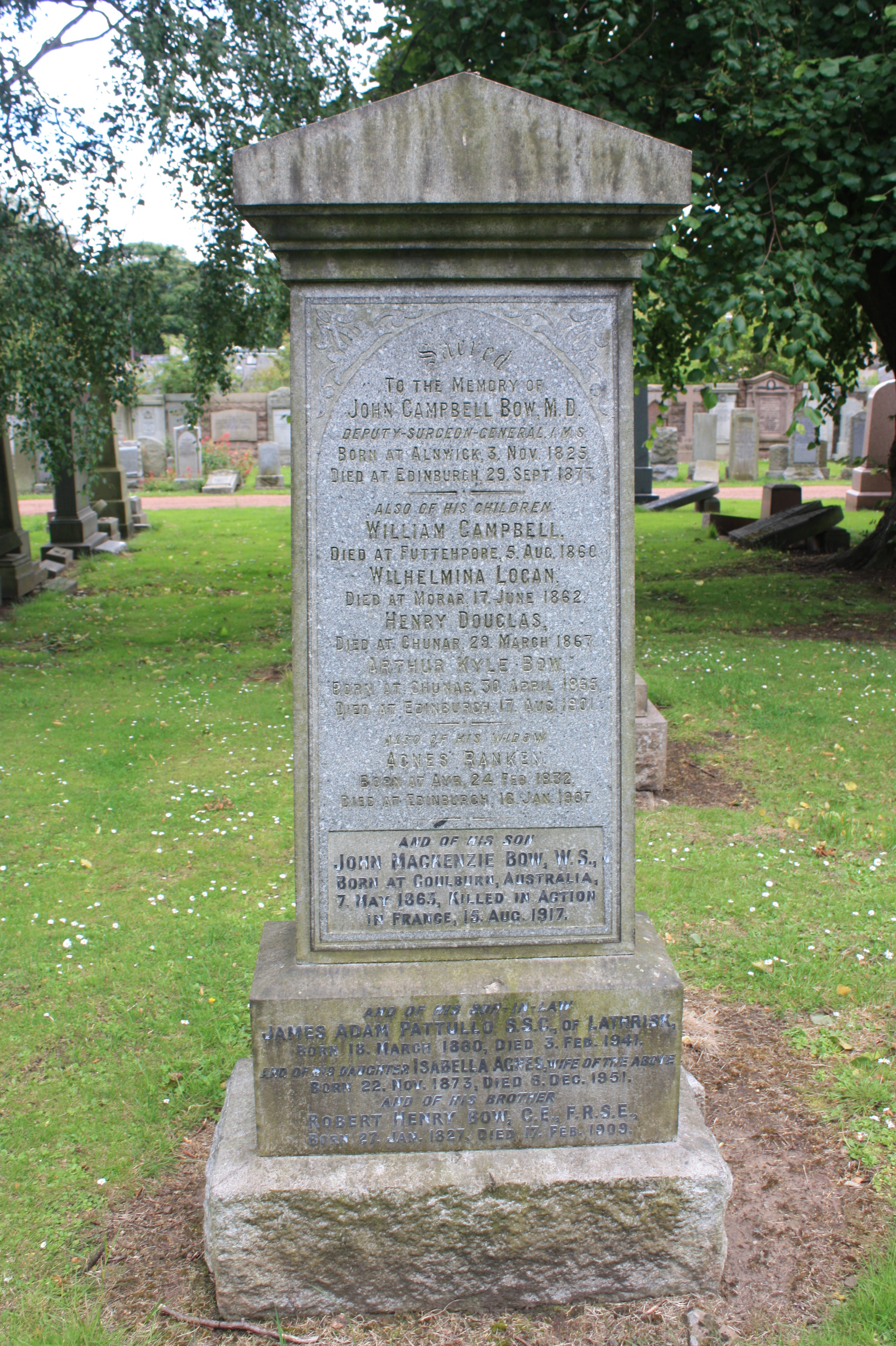
The grave of Robert Henry Bow, Grange Cemetery, Edinburgh

Robert Henry Bow FRSE (1827–1909) was a Scottish civil engineer and photographer.

== Life ==
He was born in Alnwick on 27 January 1827.

Bow worked with Edward Sang and Thomas Bouch, and his textbooks Economics of Construction in Relation to Framed Structures (1871) and Treatise on Bracing in relation to Bridges and other Structures (1874) drew on calculations he had conducted for Bouch.

In the 1860s he became fascinated with stereoscopic photography.

He was elected a Fellow of the Royal Society of Edinburgh in 1869, his proposer being Edward Sang His address was then 7 South Gray Street on the south side of Edinburgh.

He died at 7 South Gray Street on 17 February 1909 is buried in the grave of his brother Dr John Campbell Bow (1825–1877) in the Grange Cemetery in southern Edinburgh. The grave lies on the main east–west spine of the south-east section.

== See also ==
- Tay Bridge disaster
