= Cecil Voge =

Scottish physician, biochemist, geneticist

Dr Cecil Innes Bothwell Voge FRSE PhD (1898–1978) was a 20th-century Scottish physician, biochemist and geneticist. A specialist in contraception, in authorship he usually appears as C. I. B. Voge.

== Life ==
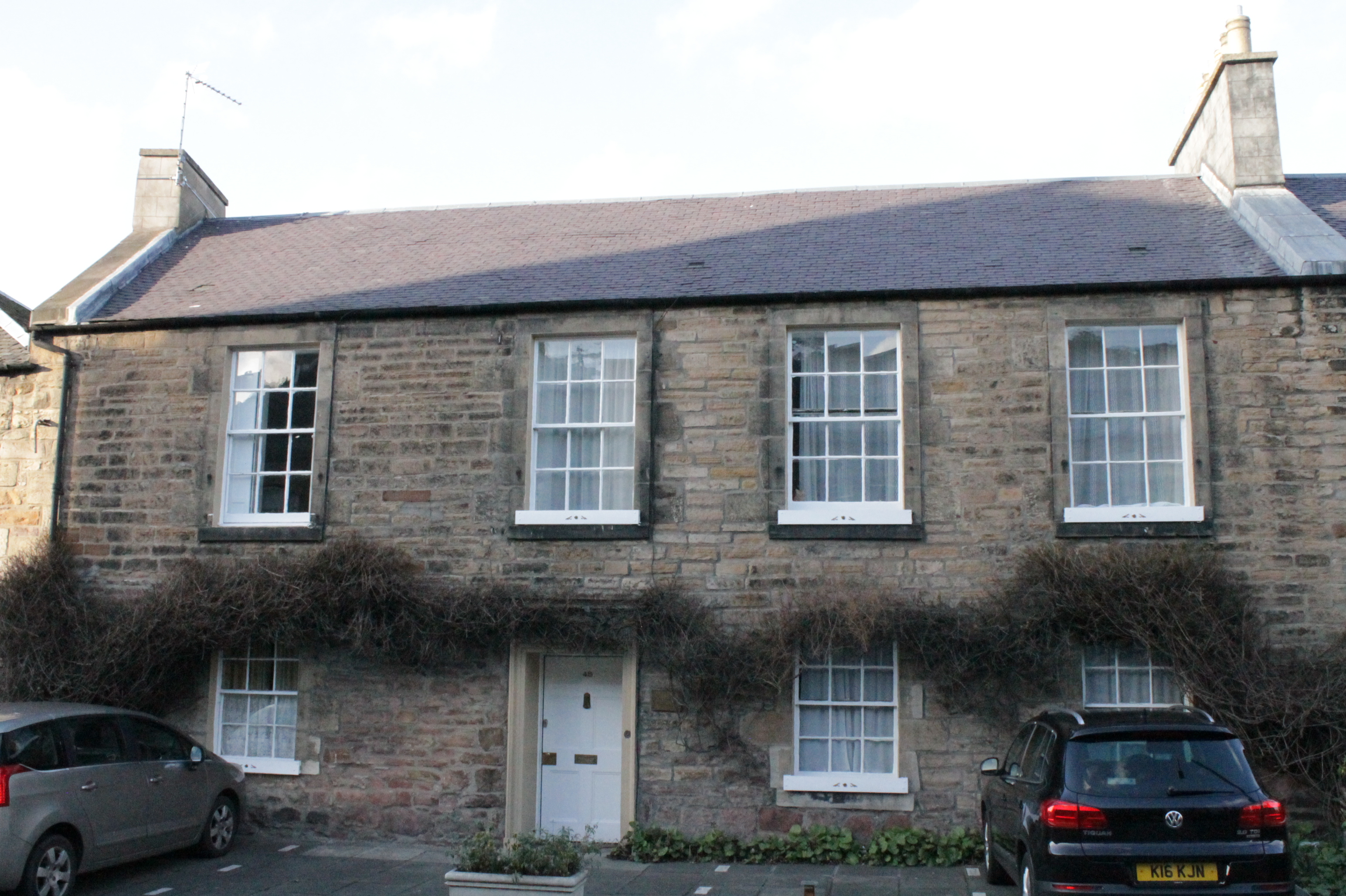
46 Gilmore Place, Edinburgh

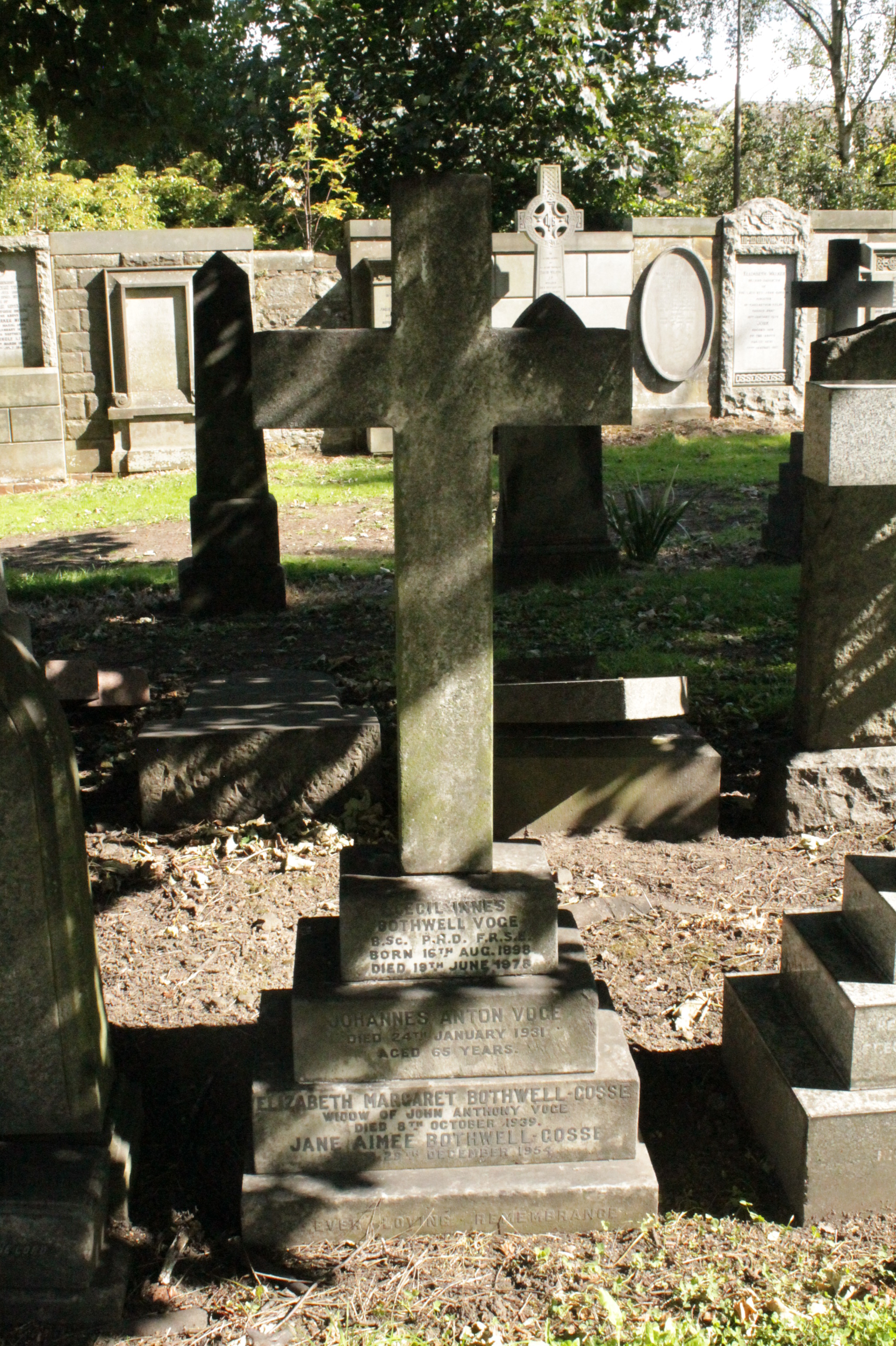
The grave of Cecil Voge, Grange Cemetery

Voge was born in Edinburgh in 1898 the son of Johannes Anton ("John Anthony") Voge (d.1931) and his wife Elizabeth Margaret Bothwell. They lived at 46 Gilmore Place. The house dates from the 18th century and is one of the largest on the street.

In the First World War he joined the Royal Flying Corps as a Second Lieutenant.

In 1930 he was elected a Fellow of the Royal Society of Edinburgh for his contributions to chemistry. His proposers were Andrew Pritchard, William Rutherford, George James Allman and John Hutton Balfour.

In 1933 he undertook an important study, funded by the Rockefeller Foundation and under the direction of F A E Crew at the Animal Breeding Research Department in Edinburgh. This study of the risks and benefits of contraception was called the 'Voge Study but caused a huge rift with Crew, who thereafter called him a traitor to science, for adding emotion into the study.

Voge retired to Hampstead in 1963.

== Family ==
He married Lily around 1930. Their children included Cecily J B Voge and Anthony W B Voge.

== Death and burial place ==
He died on 19 June 1978. He is buried with his parents in Grange Cemetery in south Edinburgh. The grave lies in the eastmost linear section facing the main east path.

== Publications ==
- The Human Blood Groups (1929)
- The Present State of the Contraceptive Trade (1933)
- The Chemistry and Physics of Contraception (1933)
- Medicinal Uses of Chlorophyll (1948)
