= David Laird Adams =

Scottish academic

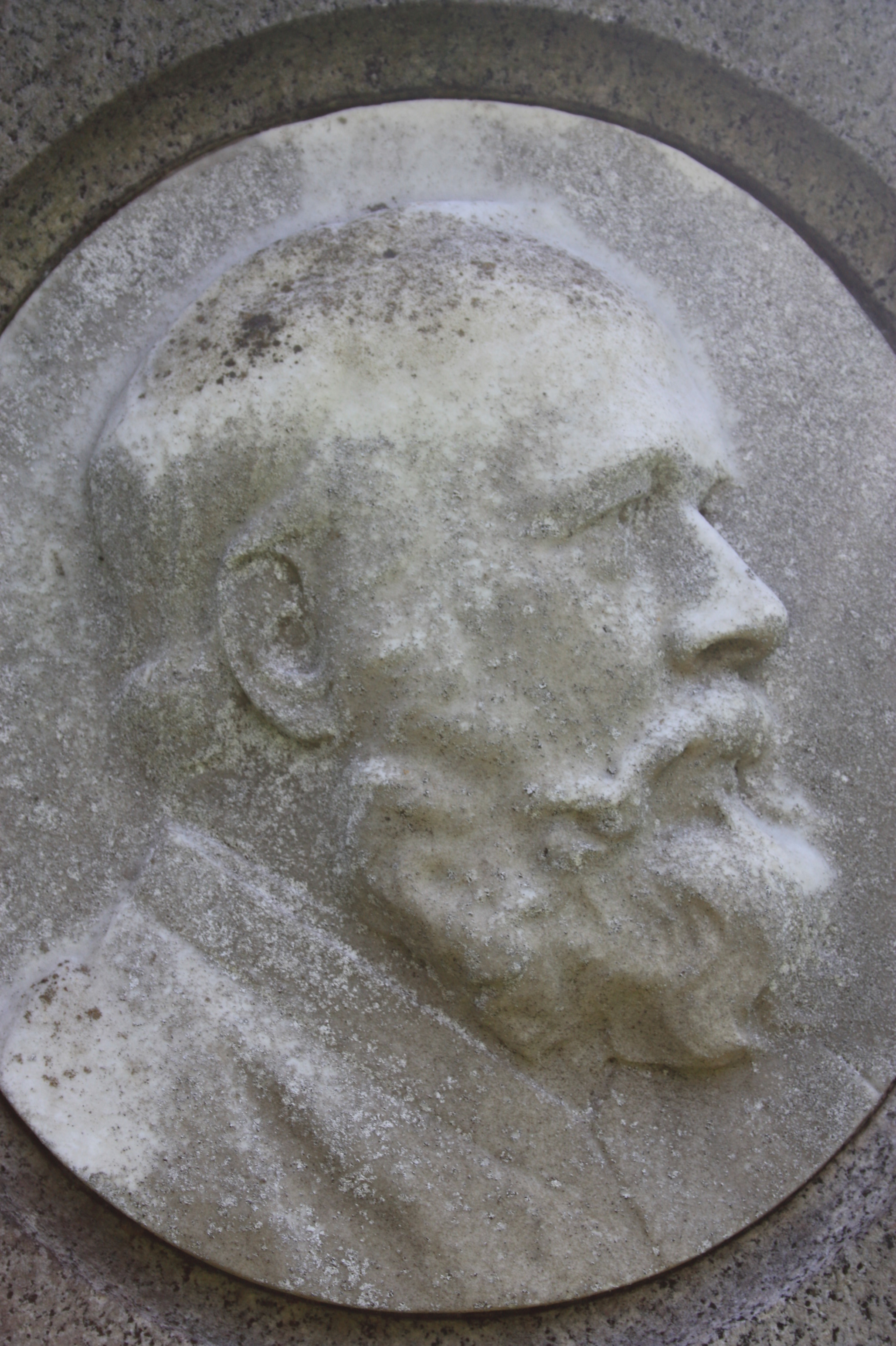
Prof David Laird Adams

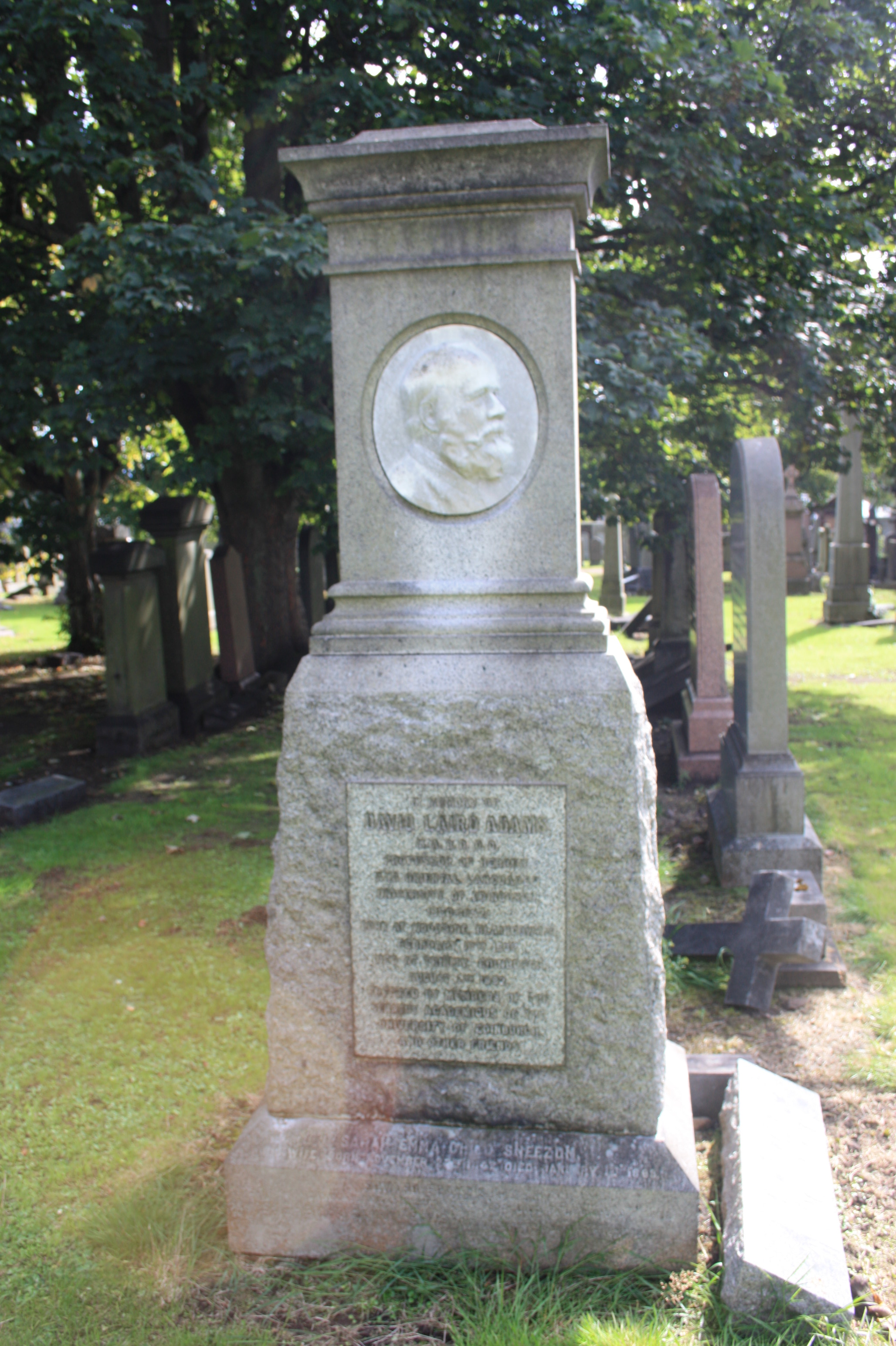
The grave of David Laird Adams, Grange Cemetery, Edinburgh

David Laird Adams (1837–1892) was a Scottish academic who was professor of Hebrew and oriental languages at the University of Edinburgh.

== Life ==
He was born at Woodside in Blairgowrie, Perthshire on 18 February 1837.

Adams studied arts and divinity at the University of Edinburgh, receiving a prize for Biblical criticism.

In 1870 he was living in Dollar, Clackmannanshire, and is thought to have been teaching classics at Dollar Academy.

He was ordained as a Church of Scotland minister at Monimail, Fife in 1875.

In 1880 he replaced Prof David Liston as professor of Hebrew and Semitic Languages at the University of Edinburgh. Adams introduced Syriac and Arabic to the syllabus. He was replaced by Prof John Dobie.

He died at Primrose Villa, Victoria Park, in Trinity, Edinburgh, on 2 August 1892. He is buried in the south-east section of Grange Cemetery in south Edinburgh.

== Family ==
He was married to Sarah Emma Child Sneezum (1842–1899). They had several children: William David Adams (d. 1927); Charles Walter Adams; Edward Francis Adams; Herbert Frederick Wilfred Adams; Euphemia Laird Adams (1870-1916); and Louisa Emma Adams. Louisa married George Washington Browne in 1905.

== Artistic recognition ==
A sketch of Prof Adams by William Brassey Hole is held by the Scottish National Portrait Gallery.
