= George T. H. Reid =

Scottish minister (1910–1900)

George T. H. Reid MC (31 March 1910 – 1990) was a Scottish minister of the Church of Scotland who served as Moderator of the General Assembly in 1973/74.

== Biography ==
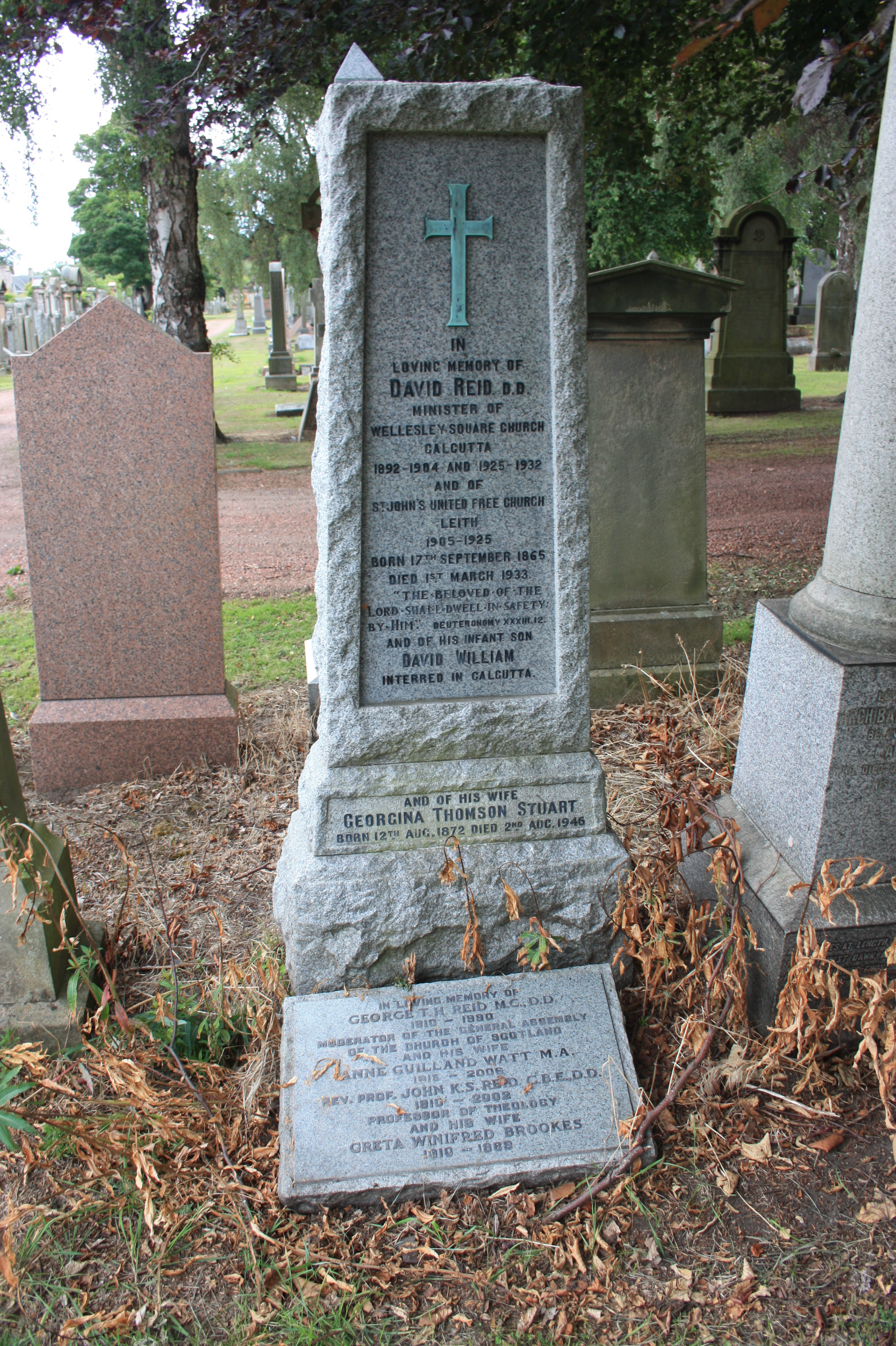
The grave of the Very Rev George T. H. Reid, Grange Cemetery

He was born on 31 March 1910, in Leith, the twin son of reverend David Reid (1865–1933) of St John's United Free Church, and his wife Georgina Thomson Stuart (1872-1946).

The family lived at 6 Claremont Park on Leith Links. From 1925 to 1932 his father ran the Wellesley Square Church in Calcutta in India.

George was educated at George Watson's College then studied Divinity at Edinburgh University.

He was minister of the Langstane Kirk in Aberdeen.

He won the Military Cross in the Second World War.

In 1973, he succeeded Ronald Selby Wright as Moderator of the General Assembly. He was succeeded in turn by Very Rev David Steel in 1974.

He retired in 1975.

He died in 1990, aged 79 or 80, and is buried with his parents and family in the Grange Cemetery in Edinburgh. The grave lies close to the south-east corner, east of the east path.

== Family ==
He was twin brother to Rev Prof John ("Jack") Kelman Sutherland Reid (1910–2002).
