= D. E. C. Mekie =

Scottish surgeon

David Eric Cameron Mekie FRSE OBE (1902–1989) was a Scottish surgeon and Keeper of the Museum of the Royal College of Surgeons of Edinburgh from 1955 to 1974.

== Life ==
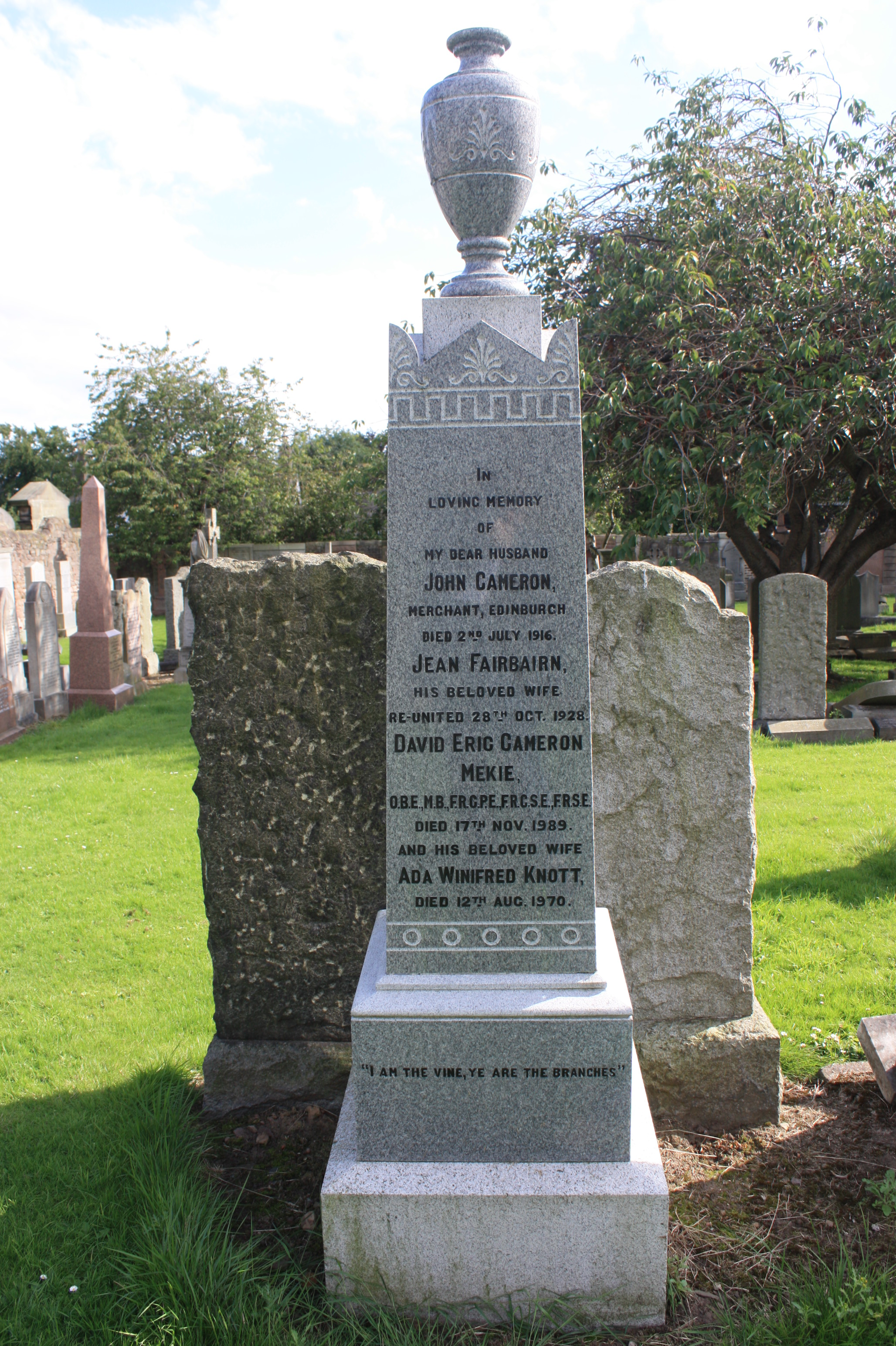
The grave of David Mekie, Grange Cemetery, Edinburgh

He was born in Edinburgh the son of David Mekie FRSE, a local builder and amateur geographer, living at Waverley Park on Spring Gardens just east of Holyrood Palace.

From 1935 to 1955 he was Professor of Surgery at the University of Singapore. He returned to Edinburgh to be Director of Post Graduate Medicine at the University of Edinburgh, also taking over the running of the Surgical Museum at the same time. He introduced the first policy of selective display within the museum.

In 1959 he was elected a member of the Harveian Society of Edinburgh. In 1962 he was elected a Fellow of the Royal Society of Edinburgh. His proposers were Sir William Wallace, George Montgomery, James Kirkwood Slater and Douglas Guthrie.

He died on 17 November 1989 and is buried in Grange Cemetery in south Edinburgh. The grave lies within the southern half of the western extension.

== Family ==
He was married to Ada Winifred Knott (died 1970).

== Publications ==
- The Museum of the Royal College of Surgeons of Edinburgh (1978) with Violet Tansey
- Atlases of Demonstrations in Surgical Pathology (1983)
