= Archibald Goldie (meteorologist) =

Scottish meteorologist

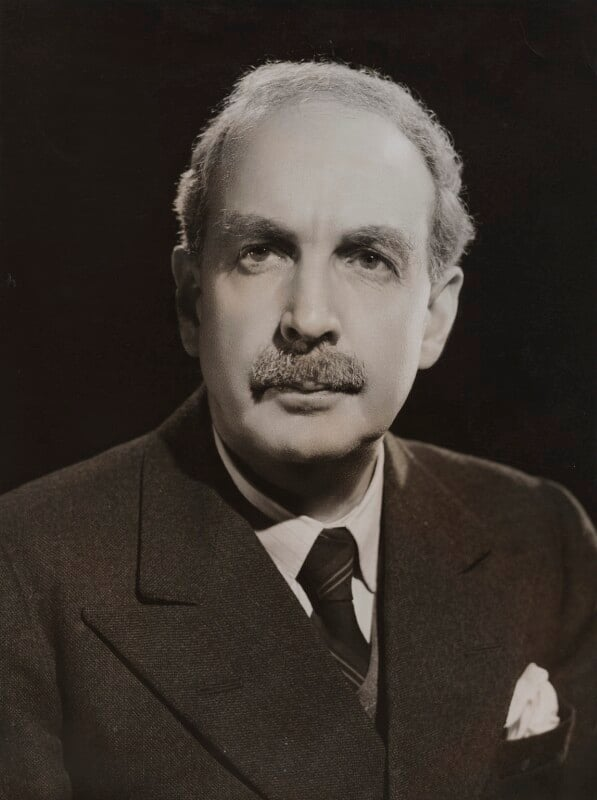
Goldie in 1947

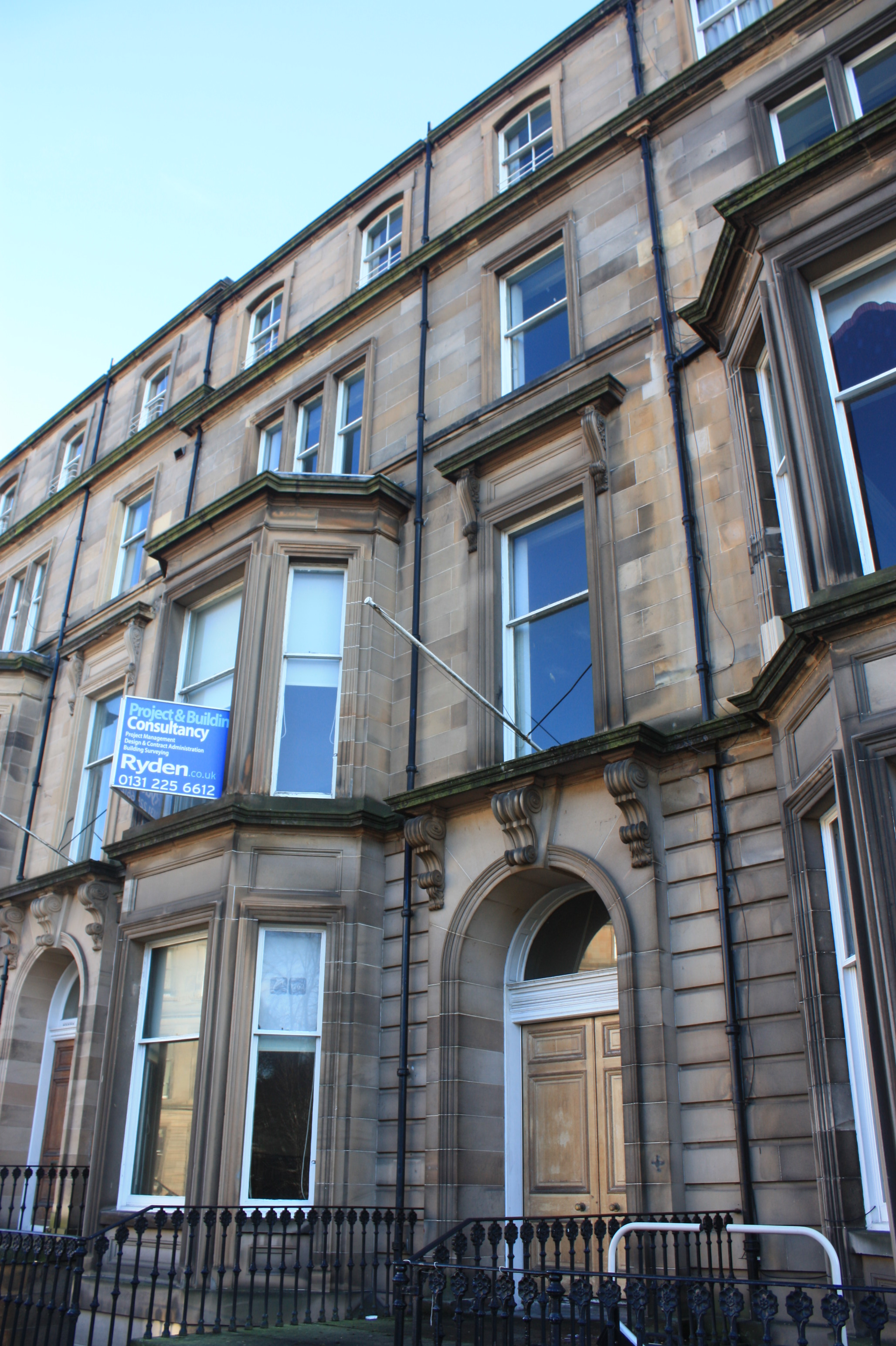
Goldie's house at 6 Drumsheugh Gardens, Edinburgh

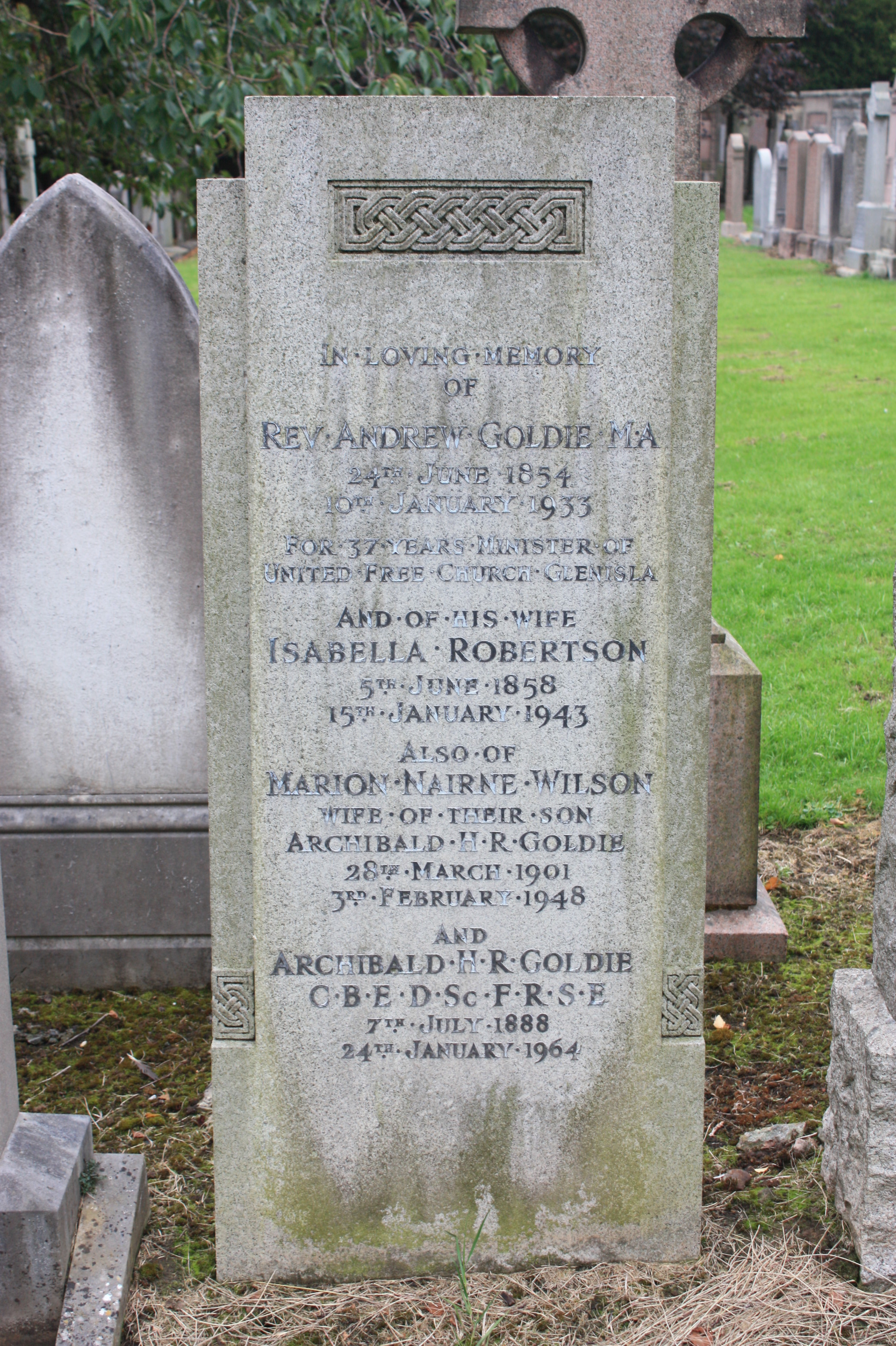
The grave of Archibald H. R. Goldie, Grange Cemetery, Edinburgh

Dr Archibald Hayman Robertson Goldie CBE FRSE FRMS (usually referred to simply as A. H. R. Goldie in references) (1888-1964) was a Scottish meteorologist. He was Assistant Director at the London Meteorological Office 1938-1953. He researched the global circulation of air currents at high level and atmospheric turbulence affecting aircraft. He did much research on vapour trails from aircraft, and published several papers on how to avoid such in a military context. He was also one of the first scientists to explain the scintillation (twinkling) of stars at night.

== Life ==
He was born in Glenisha, Angus, Scotland, the son of Rev Andrew Goldie (1854-1933), minister, and his wife, Isabella Robertson. He studied at Harris Academy in Dundee. He then was awarded a place at Cambridge University graduating MA in 1913. He immediately began training as a weather forecaster, training first at Falmouth Observatory.

He was elected a Fellow of the Royal Society of Edinburgh in 1925, his proposers including Sir Ernest Wedderburn. He served as Vice President of the Society from 1953 to 1956. St Andrews University awarded him a doctorate in 1936 (DSc). In 1951 he was awarded a Commander of the Order of the British Empire (CBE) for service in the Meteorological Office.

Through the 1950s he served on the government’s Atmospheric Pollution Committee which brought around the evolution of the Clean Air Act and various early atmospheric pollution controls, largely aimed at eliminating smog.

He died in Edinburgh on 24 January 1964. He is buried with his parents and first wife in the Grange Cemetery on the east side of the south-west extension. The Journal of the Royal Meteorological Society published his obituary in July 1964.

=== War service ===
He served as a Major in the Royal Engineers in the First World War largely connected to the army’s meteorological service (which played a major role in many campaigns). He was twice Mentioned in Dispatches.

In the Second World War he worked firstly in the Climatological and Instruments Division based at Stonehouse, Gloucestershire and then in 1941 became responsible for the administration of the Meteorological Research Committee, which was most famously responsible for many areas in the planning of the D-Day landings.

== Family ==
He married twice: firstly in 1928 to Marion Nairne Wilson (d.1948); and secondly in 1952 to Helen Carruthers. At the time of his first marriage he lived at 6 Drumsheugh Gardens in Edinburgh’s West End.
