= William Henderson (physician) =

Scottish physician

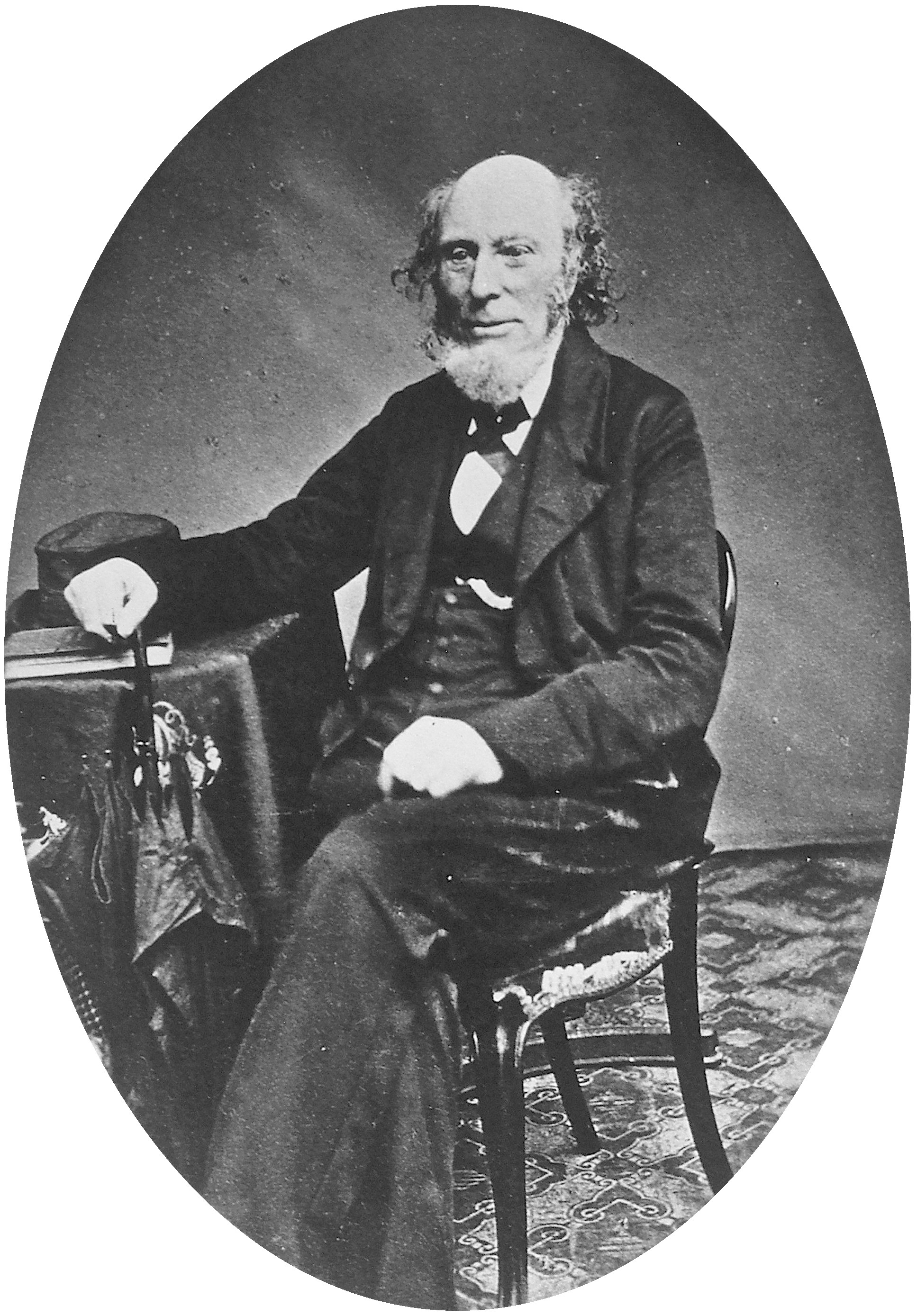
William Henderson

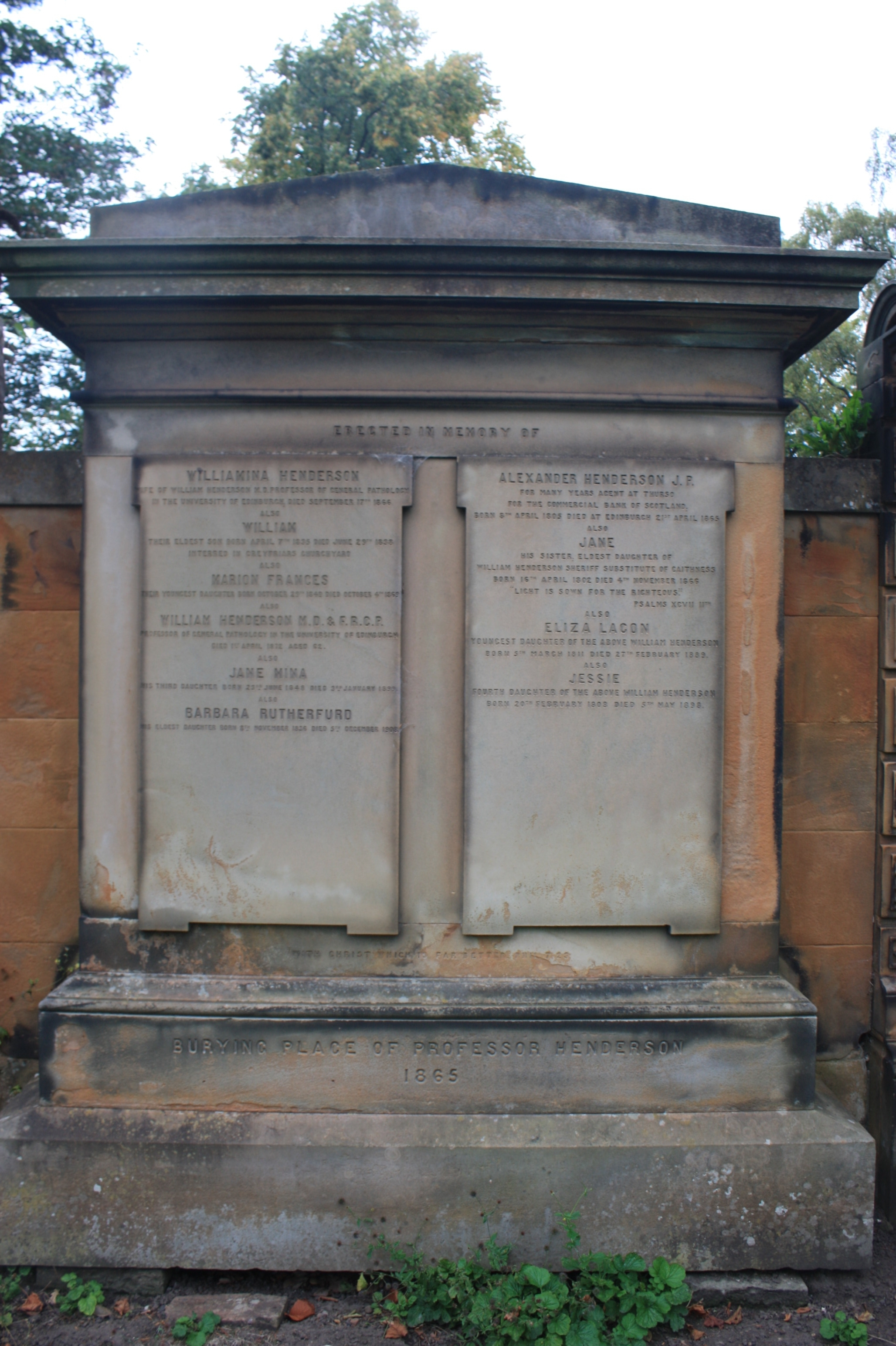
The grave of Prof William Henderson, Grange Cemetery

William Henderson (10 January 1810 – 1 April 1872) was a conventionally trained Scottish physician who became an influential advocate for homeopathy in Great Britain.

== Life ==
Henderson was born in Thurso in Caithness.

William Henderson was appointed professor of general pathology at the University of Edinburgh and physician-in-ordinary to the Edinburgh Royal Infirmary. He authored important articles on the clinical and pathological aspects of aortic and heart disease. He also contributed to the recognition of typhus and typhoid fever as separate diseases. In 1840 he was elected a member of the Harveian Society of Edinburgh. In 1843 he was elected a member of the Aesculapian Club although resigned his membership in 1845.

Henderson was an early advocate for homeopathy in Scotland and was at the center of a controversy surrounding the introduction of homeopathy to Edinburgh in the early 1840s. This involved the Faculty of Medicine, the Royal College of Physicians of Edinburgh (RCPE) and other medical societies, as well as prominent medical figures of the period including Sir John Forbes, Professor Sir James Simpson, Professor Sir Robert Christison and Professor James Syme. Many Scottish physicians were influenced by Henderson's teachings and they in turn were involved in the wider introduction of homeopathy in Britain.

In his retirement, Henderson was author to a reference work on the Bible.

He is buried with his wife Williamina and other members of his family against the north wall of the Grange Cemetery in Edinburgh.

== Publications ==
- William Henderson and John Reid, "A Report on the Epidemic Fever of Edinburgh", Edinburgh Medical and Surgical Journal, vol. 52, 1839, pp. 429–462.
- William Henderson, An Inquiry into the Homeopathic Practice of Medicine, published simultaneously by J. Leath (London), Smyth (Liverpool), MacLachlan and Stewart (Edinburgh), 1845.
- William Henderson, Homeopathy Fairly Represented: A Reply to Professor Simpson's "Homeopathy Misrepresented", Lindsay & Blakiston (Philadelphia) 1854. Available in reprint from Kessinger Publishing, 2008, ISBN 1-4369-6126-2.
- William Henderson, "A Letter to John Forbes", British Journal of Homeopathy, April 1846.
- William Henderson, Dictionary and Concordance of the Names of Persons and Places of the Old and New Testaments, T. & T. Clark (Edinburgh), 1869, 680 pp.
