= William Manson (theologian) =

British theologian

William Manson (14 April 1882 – 4 April 1958) was a British theologian.

== Life ==
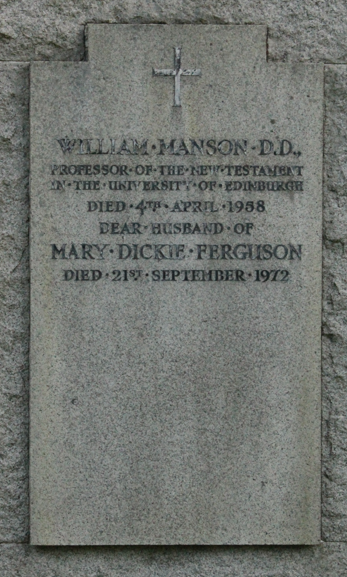
The grave of William Manson, Grange Cemetery

He was educated at the University of Glasgow, where he graduated in 1904. Later he studied at the Oriel College in Oxford, when he graduated in 1908. In the same year he returned to Glasgow and studied at the United Free Church College. Ordained in 1911, he was minister at Dunollie Road United Free Church, Oban until 1914. In that year he married Mary D. Ferguson and also moved to Glasgow to minister at Pollockshields East UF church.

In 1919 he was appointed to the Chair of New Testament at Knox College in Toronto. In 1925 he became professor of New Testament at the University of Edinburgh. In 1946 he was appointed to the Chair of Biblical Criticism at the University of Edinburgh. In 1952 he retired from teaching. William Manson died in 1958.

He is buried in Grange Cemetery in south Edinburgh with his wife Mary Dickie Ferguson (d.1972). The grave lies on the south wall in the south-west corner of the original cemetery next to the grave of Rev A. M. Renwick.
