= Hugh Miller the younger =

Scottish geologist (1850–1896)

Hugh Miller FRSE FGS (1850–1896) was a Scottish geologist, son of his more famous father, the geologist and folklorist Hugh Miller.

== Life ==
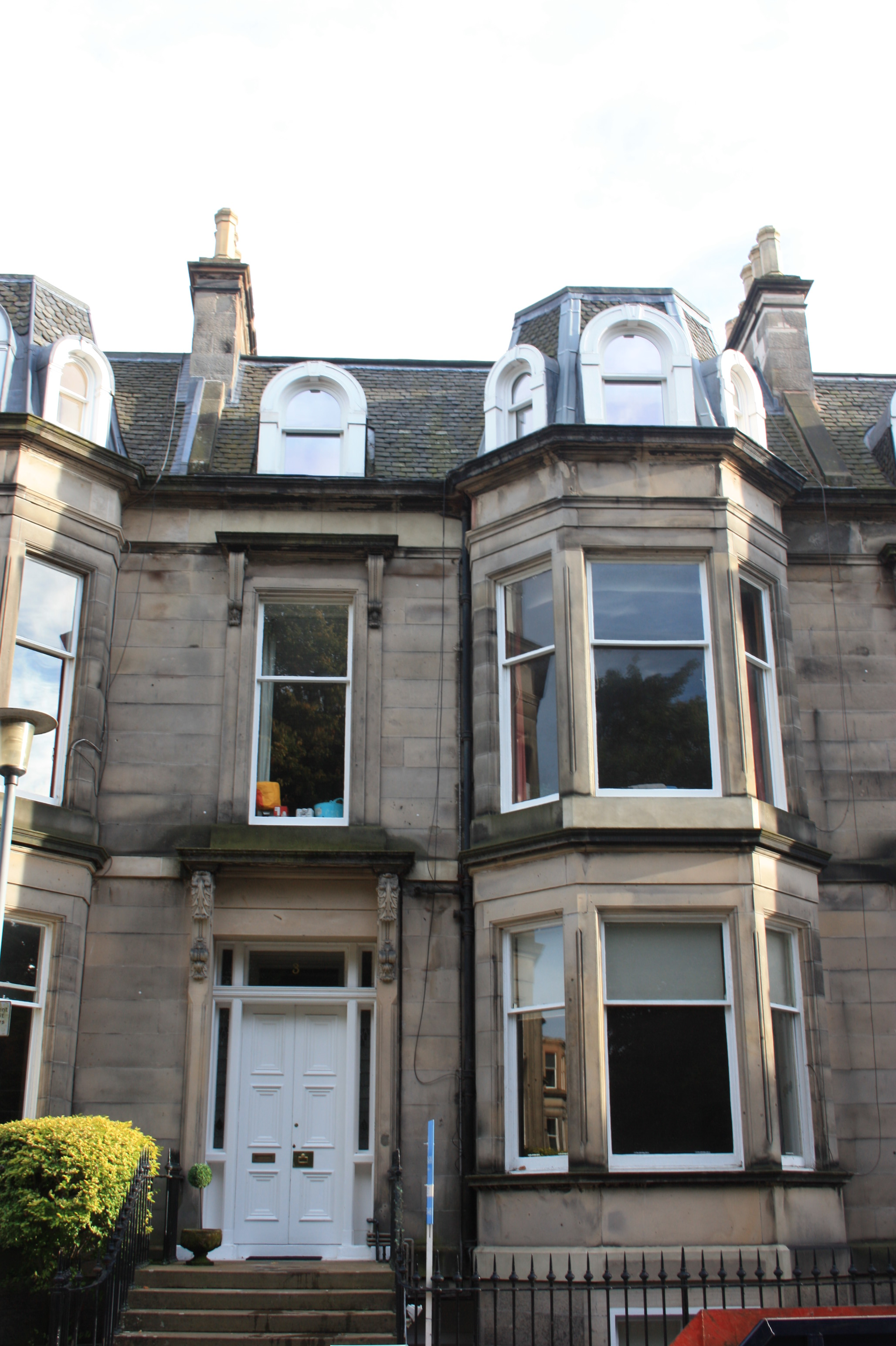
3 Douglas Crescent, Edinburgh

He was born on 15 July 1850 in Leith, the youngest of four children of Hugh Miller and his wife, Lydia Fraser. (Note: The younger Miller is not generally referred to as Hugh Miller Jr., but rather "Hugh Miller F.R.S.E., F.G.S.", or "of the Geological Survey" or "the younger" to distinguish him from his father.) He was baptised at South Leith Parish Church in October 1850. The family lived at 2 Stuart Street at Jock's Lodge in Edinburgh. His father shot himself at their later home on Tower Street in Portobello in 1856.

Miller attended Edinburgh Academy for one year (1859/60), then moved to the High School, then again to the Edinburgh Institution. He finally left Edinburgh to attend the Green Row Academy in Silloth. He then studied geology at the Royal School of Mines in London (1869–1972).

In 1874 Miller joined the British Geological Survey. He worked in Northumberland, Cromarty and Sutherlandshire. In 1886 he was elected a Fellow of the Royal Society of Edinburgh. His proposers were James Geikie, Robert Gray, Ramsay Heatley Traquair and Ben Peach.

Miller lived at 3 Douglas Crescent in Edinburgh's West End, a terraced townhouse facing the Water of Leith. He died on 9 January 1896. He is buried next to his father in the north-west corner of Grange Cemetery in south Edinburgh.

== Family ==
In 1878 Miller married Mrs Jane Morison Campbell, a widow.

== Publications ==
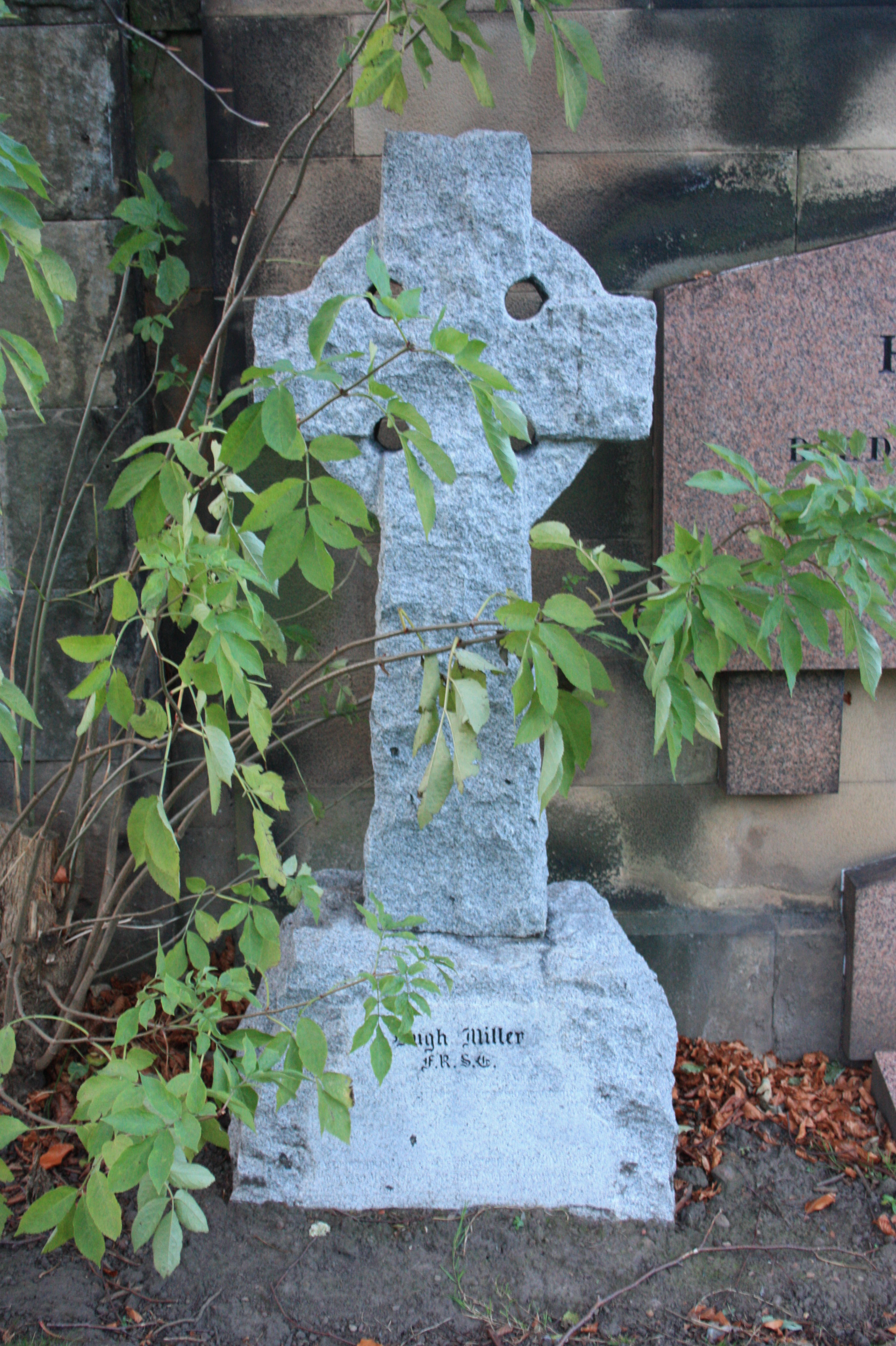
The grave of Hugh Miller FRSE, Grange Cemetery, Edinburgh

- Landscape Geology (1884)
- Boulder Glaciation (1884)
- Otterburn and Elsdon (1887)
- Plashetts and Kielder (1889)
