= James Roderick Johnston Cameron =

Scottish surgeon

James Roderick Johnston Cameron PPRCSE (24 June 1902–23 February 1997) was a 20th century Scottish surgeon who served as President of the Royal College of Surgeons of Edinburgh from 1967 to 1970.

== Life ==
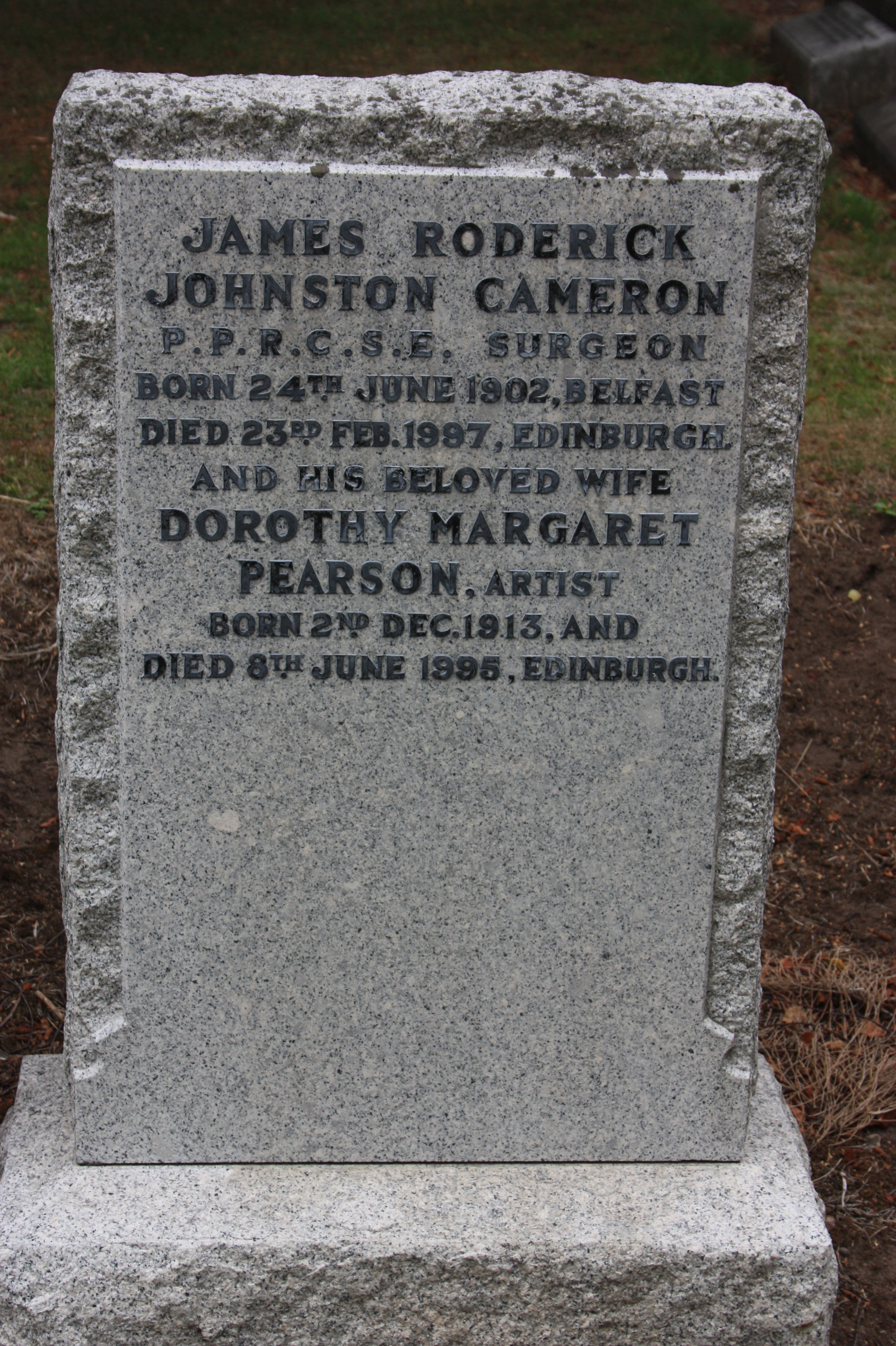
The grave of James Roderick Johnston Cameron, Grange Cemetery

He was born on 24 June 1902 in Belfast the son of a dentist of Scottish descent, and originally trained as a dentist.

He studied medicine at the University of Edinburgh, and did postgraduate studies at the University of Montreal and McGill University developing an interest in neurosurgery under Prof Wilder Penfield. Returning to the Scotland he became an assistant surgeon at Leith Hospital then in 1939 took up a position at Edinburgh Royal Infirmary. At the outbreak of the Second World War he joined the Royal Army Medical Corps. He landed at Narvik following the D-Day landings. A hand injury prevented him from operating and he was posted to the Chasseurs Alpins (Les Diables Bleu) as their Medical Officer. He returned to Edinburgh after the war and specialised in thyroid treatment.

In 1956 Cameron was elected a member of the Harveian Society of Edinburgh and served as President in 1969.

He died in Edinburgh on 23 February 1997. He is buried in Grange Cemetery. The simple stone lies in the south-west section.

== Family ==
In 1940, just prior to going to war, he married Dorothy Margaret Pearson (1913-1995). She was an artist and her portrait of James is held in the Royal College of Surgeons of Edinburgh. They had two daughters and two sons.
