= John Cameron (anatomist) =

Scottish anatomist

Professor John Cameron FRSE (16 September 1873 – 27 November 1960) was a Scottish anatomist who moved to Nova Scotia to teach at Dalhousie University. He was a noted author on subjects deciphering human evolution through anatomical analysis including The Skeleton of British Neolthic Man.

== Life ==
He was born in Laurencekirk in Kincardineshire on 16 September 1873, the son of Major David Cameron.

He attended Montrose Academy and then went on to the University of Edinburgh to study medicine. He graduated with a MB ChB in 1898. From 1899 to 1905 he acted as a Demonstrator in Anatomy at the University of St Andrews. The university awarded him a doctorate (DSc) in 1904 and the University of Edinburgh awarded him a MD degree in the same year. In 1905 he moved to the University of Manchester as a Senior Demonstrator. In 1908 he moved to be a lecturer at the University of London, also then working at Middlesex Hospital.

In 1915 he left Britain to go to Nova Scotia to take a role as Professor of Anatomy at Dalhousie University, continuing in this role until 1930.

He died in Bournemouth in England on 27 November 1960.

== Memberships ==
- Fellow of the Royal Society of Edinburgh (1905)
- Member of the New York Academy of Science (1957)
- American Association of Anatomists

== Publications ==
- Textbook of Regional Anatomy (1931)
- Textbook of Osteology and Arthrology (1921)
- Researches in Craniometry 2 vols (1928, 1931)
- The Skeleton of British Neolithic Man (1934)

== Family ==
He married Elsie Moffat in 1925.
