= Morrell Draper =

Morrell Henry Draper OBE FRSE (10 July 1921 – 1 October 2005) was an Australian-born medical researcher and administrator. His field was toxicology, particularly in relation to carcinogens, and his research led to the new term of metademography. He specialised in the study of heavy metals and their toxic effects.

== Life ==
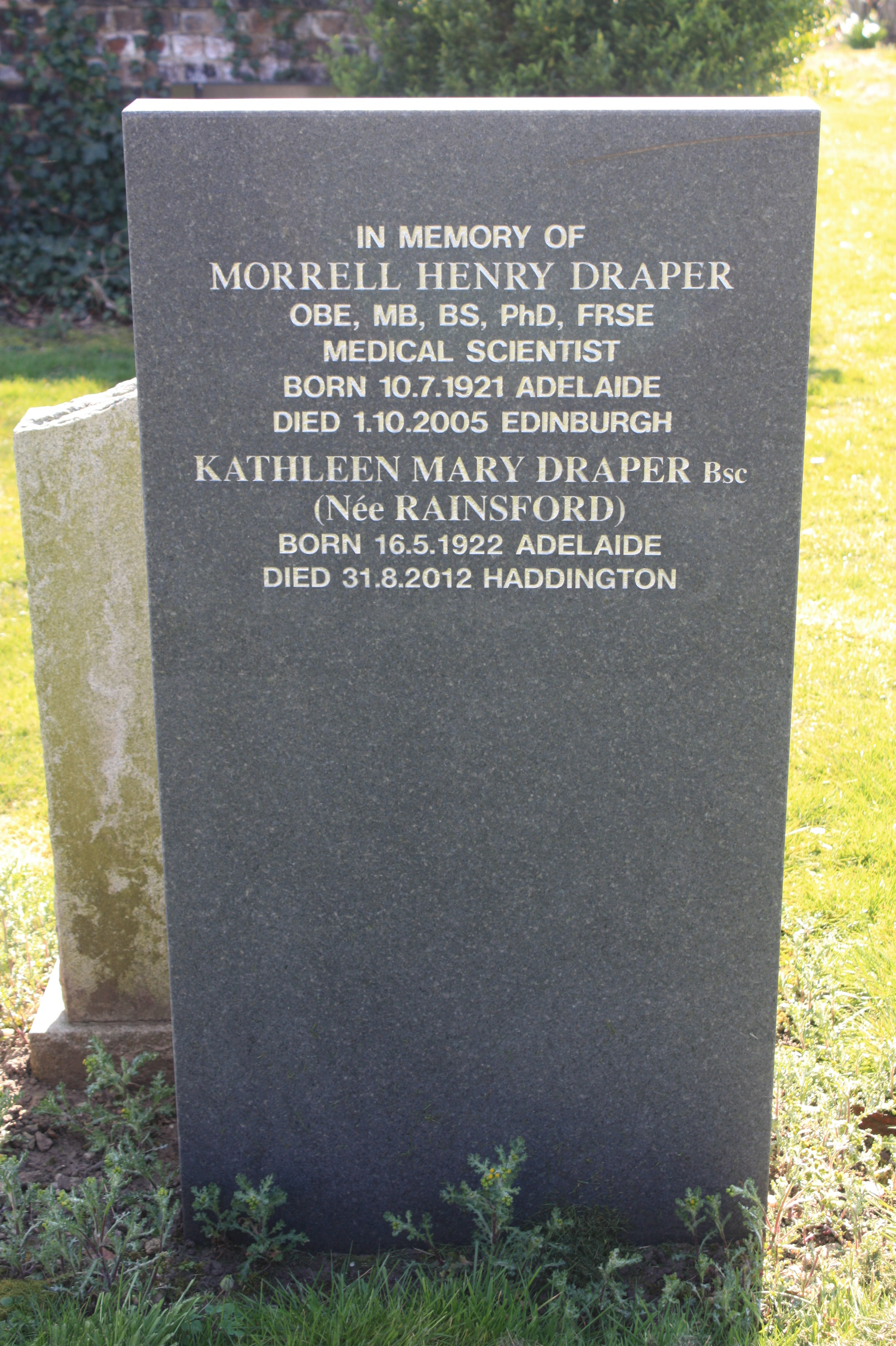
Draper's grave, Grange Cemetery, Edinburgh

Draper was born in Adelaide, Australia, on 10 July 1921. He was educated at St Peter's College, Adelaide. Whilst at college he began running and reached the level of champion for South Australia. He graduated MB BSc in 1944 and served one year as resident house surgeon at the Royal Adelaide Hospital before being gazetted as a captain into the Royal Army Medical Corps in 1945. In 1946, following demobilisation, he became a research fellow at the National Health and Medical Research Council of Australia.

In 1949 he won a travelling scholarship and left Australia to study at the University of Cambridge in England where, in 1955, he received a doctorate in neurophysiology. Here he worked with Alan Hodgkin, Andrew Huxley, and Richard Keynes. In athletics the University awarded him a Blue and he ran last leg in the Oxford-Cambridge relay race of 1951, winning the race.

In 1956 he moved to the University of Edinburgh to begin lecturing in physiology, later becoming a senior lecturer. He left the University in 1962 to take up the post of Principal Scientific Officer at the Agricultural Research Council, going on to become Deputy Director.

In 1971 he was named an Australian Officer of the Order of the British Empire and in 1973 he was elected a Fellow of the Royal Society of Edinburgh.

In 1976 he moved to the British Council in London and from there to the Department of Health and Social Security where he took over the role of testing and authenticating the safety of new drugs. In 1980 he took a position at the International Programme on Chemical Safety, World Health Organization, working in Copenhagen and Geneva. He retired in 1984 and continued as a consultant to the Health and Safety Directorate in Britain in relation to issues of toxicology. He died on 1 October 2005, and is buried in the modern north-western section of Grange Cemetery in south Edinburgh. The grave lies in the south-west part of the section.

== Family ==
In 1944 he married Kathleen Mary Rainsford (1922-2012) and together they had three daughters and one son.
