= Thomas Finlayson (Presbyterian minister) =

Scottish minister of the United Presbyterian Church (1809–1872)

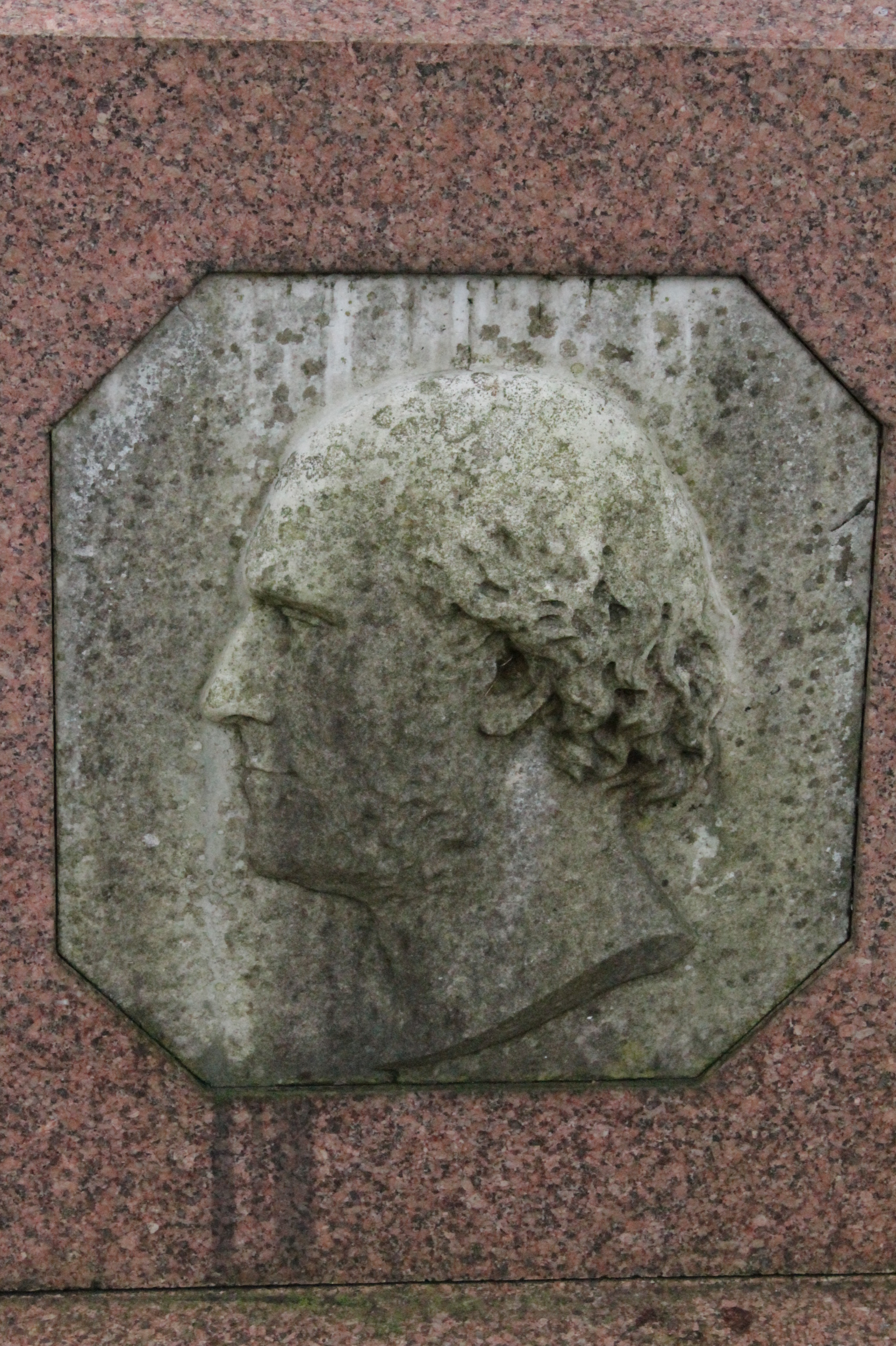
- Rev Thomas Finlayson

Personal details
- Born: 22 December 1809 Perthshire, Scotland
- Died: 17 October 1872 (aged 62) Campbeltown, Argyll, Scotland
- Buried: Grange cemetery, Edinburgh
- Denomination: (1) New Licht United Secession Church; (2) United Presbyterian Church (Scotland)
- Occupation: Minister

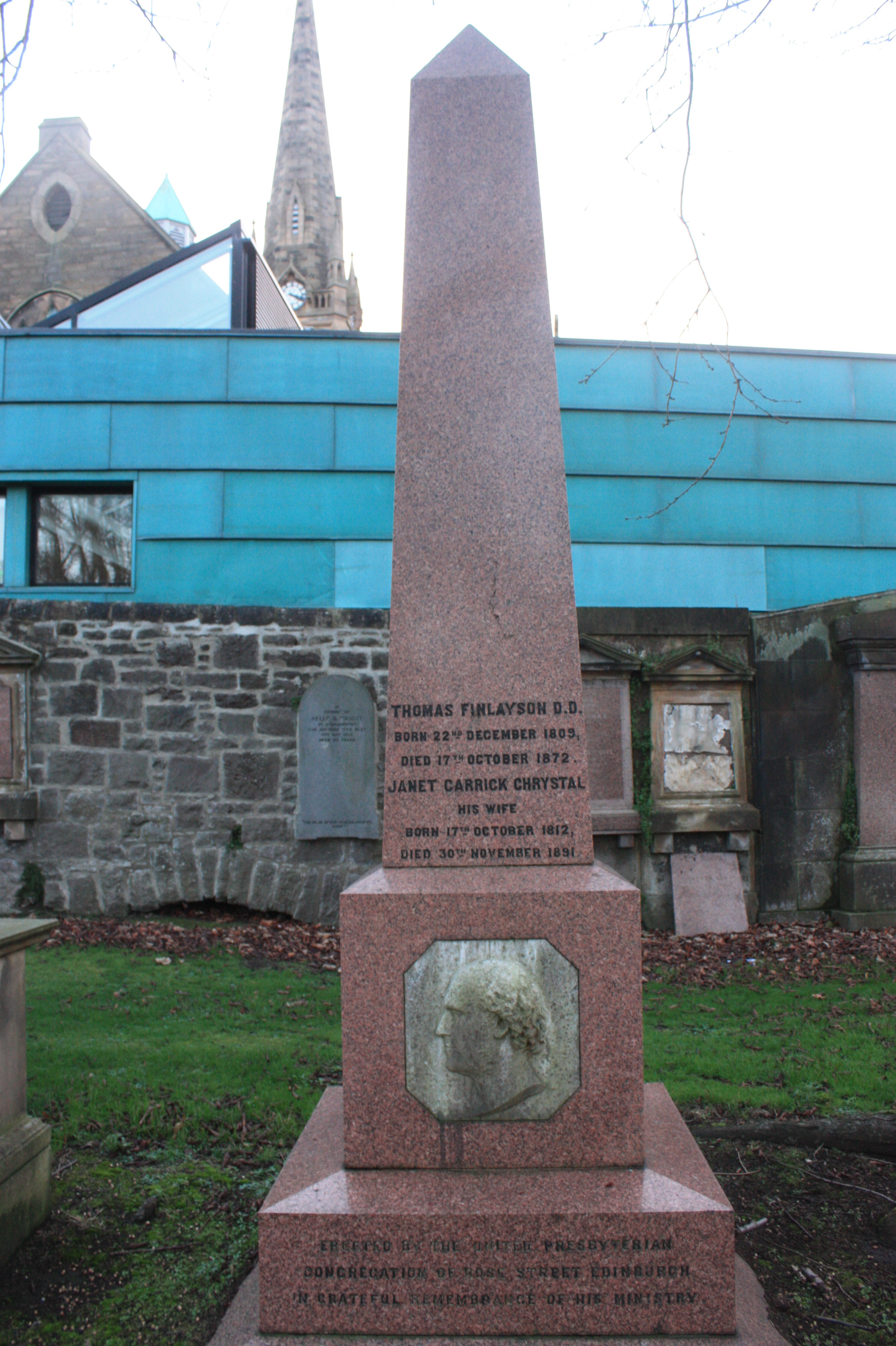
The grave of Rev Thomas Finlayson, Grange Cemetery, Edinburgh

Thomas Finlayson (1809–1872) was a Scottish minister of the United Presbyterian church.

== Life ==
Finlayson, second son of Thomas Finlayson, a farmer, was born at Coldoch Farm near Blair Drummond in Perthshire on 22 December 1809. He received his elementary education at the parish school of Kincardine-in-Menteith, before entering college studied the classics at a school in the village of Doune in Kilmadock parish. At the University of Glasgow and at the theological hall of the United Secession Church he went through the usual course of training, and was licensed as a preacher of the gospel in April 1835 by the Presbytery of Stirling and Falkirk. Part of his period of study was spent in teaching a school at Dumbarton, where he formed a friendship with the Rev. Dr. Andrew Somerville, who later became secretary of the foreign mission of the United Presbyterian Church.

In November 1835 Finlayson was ordained minister of the Union Street congregation in Greenock, where he founded a missionary society, and in two years persuaded his people to pay off the debt existing on the church. After twelve years in Greenock he was called to be colleague and successor to the Rev. John M'Gilchrist of Rose Street Church, Edinburgh, and was inducted to the ministry there in September 1847. He was elected moderator of the supreme court of his church in 1867, and shortly afterwards received the honorary doctorate of Doctor of Divinity (D.D.) from the University of Edinburgh. As one of the most ardent promoters of the Manse Fund, he was the chief agent in raising £45,000, which led to the spending of £120,000 in building and improving manses in two hundred localities.

In 1868 Finlayson was stricken by the death of his eldest son Thomas, an advocate at the Scottish bar.

On 7 October 1872 his congregation celebrated the semi-jubilee of his ministry in Edinburgh. Having gone to Campbeltown to take part in an induction service there, he was suddenly attacked with heart failure, and was found dead in his bed on 17 October 1872. He was buried in the Grange cemetery, Edinburgh, on 22 Oct. The grave lies to the north-west facing the main west path.

== Family ==
In 1836 he married Janet Carrick Chrystal (1812-1891), by whom he had six children.
