= Andrew Mure =

Sir Andrew Mure

Judge of the Supreme Court of Mauritius
- In office 1880–1895

Sheriff-Substitute of Shetland
- In office 1865–1878

Personal details
- Born: Edinburgh, Scotland
- Died: 10 October 1909 Edinburgh, Scotland

Sir Andrew Mure (died 10 October 1909) was a judge of the supreme court of the Crown colony of Mauritius from 1880 to 1895, ending his career as senior puisne judge.

Mure was born in Edinburgh, youngest son of George Mure, a Royal Navy surgeon. He graduated from the University of Edinburgh in 1848 and was appointed Reid Fellow there in 1849. Called to the Scottish Bar in 1853, he was appointed an advocate depute in 1860 and served as Sheriff-Substitute of Shetland from 1865 to 1878. He was knighted on 14 January 1899.

Mure married Elizabeth Slight (died 5 September 1908) in 1860. He died at his home, 4 McLaren Road, Edinburgh, on 10 October 1909 at the age of 82.
