= William Sibbald =

Scottish architect

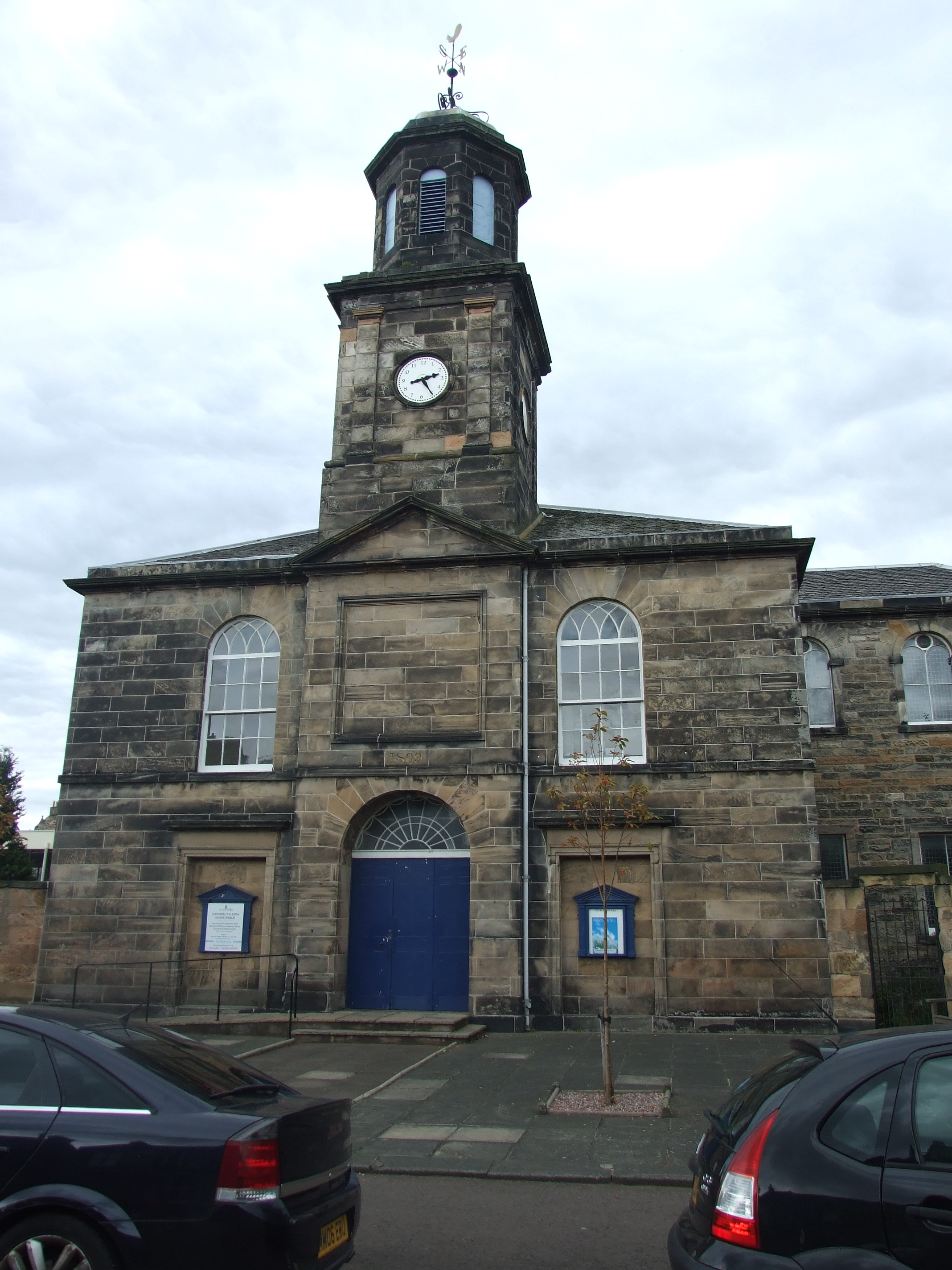
Portobello Parish Church

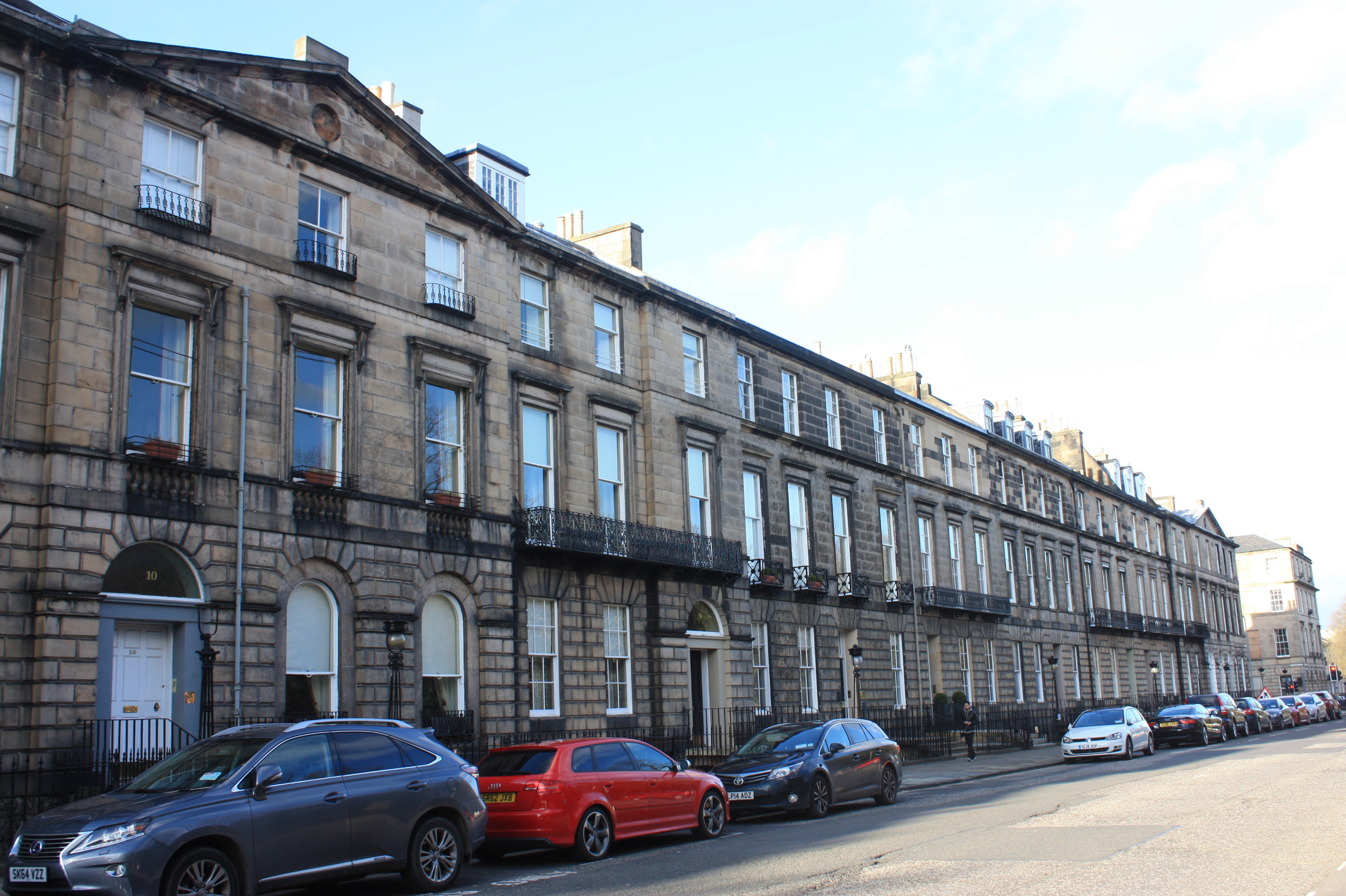
Heriot Row

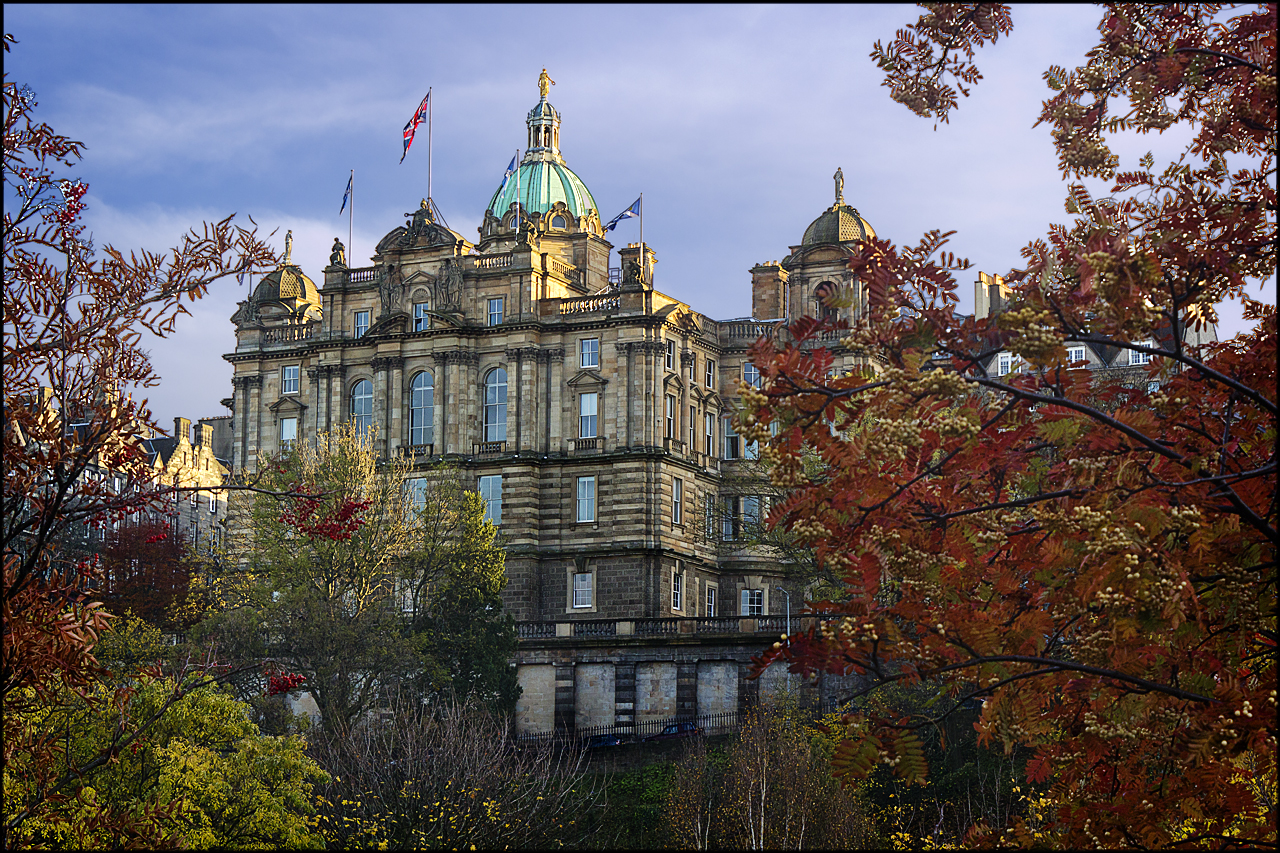
Bank of Scotland HQ on The Mound in Edinburgh

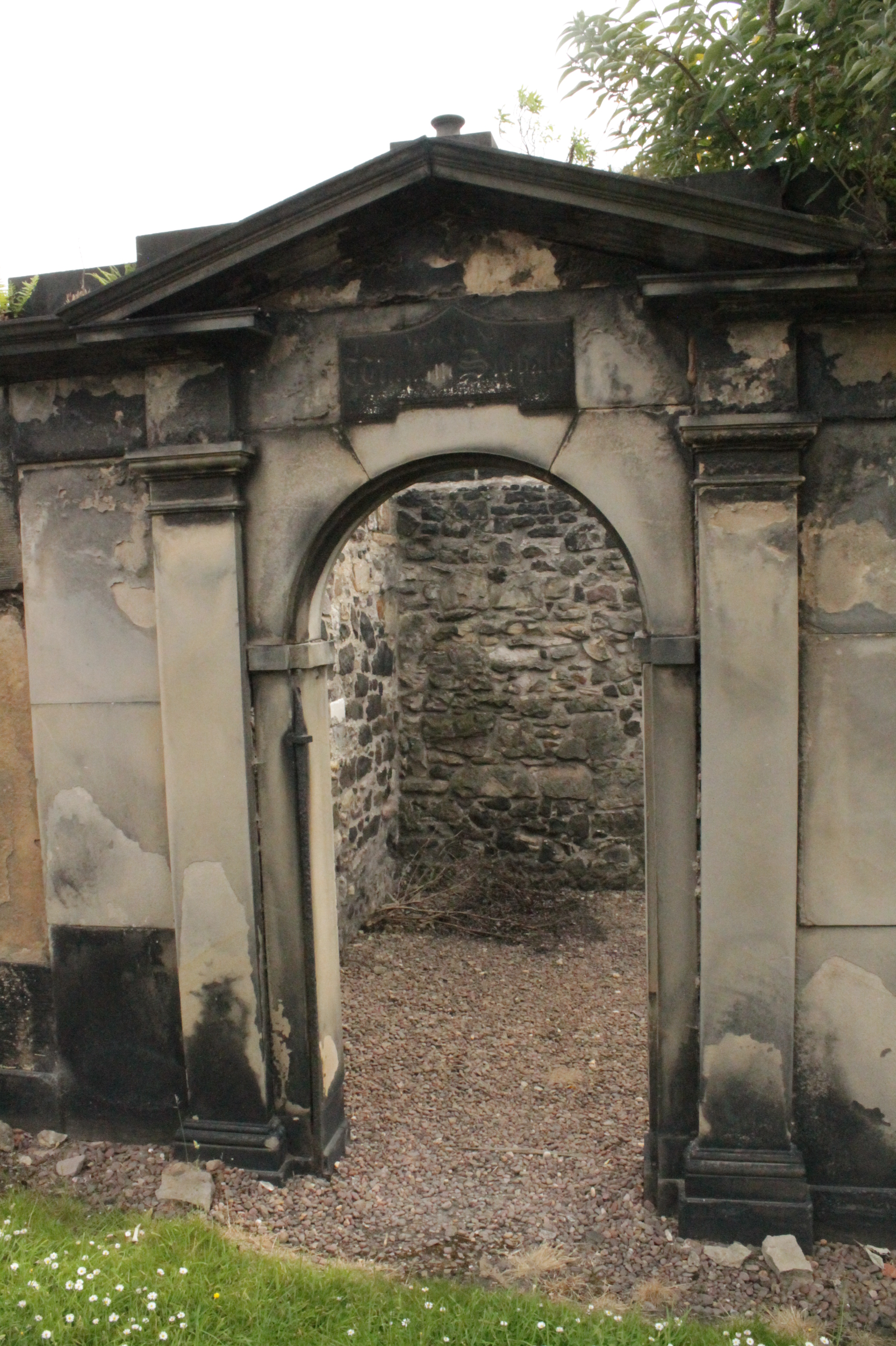
The grave of William Sibbald, Old Calton Burial Ground

William Sibbald (c.1760–1809) was a Scottish architect. He was superintendent of public works in Edinburgh and assisted Robert Reid in setting out and designing the Second New Town.

Their joint work is the largest single development in Georgian Edinburgh, and, due to its highly intact nature, is one of the most important areas of Georgian development.

== Life ==
He was born in or near Inverness c. 1760. There he designed a new manse for St Cuthberts Church

He appears in Edinburgh in 1790 living at 18 (Mid) Rose Street in the First New Town (which was then a new building).

He was superintendent of public works from 1790 to 1803. In 1792 he sent a plan to ex-Provost David Steuart representing both Steuart's own land ownerships and the governors of George Heriot's Trust, the landowners of the fields to the north of the largely complete First New Town. The original plan only covered land west of Gabriels Road (a road from Stockbridge to the east end of Princes Street. However, in 1797 the city acquired a five-acre site east of Gabriels Road, allowing a more extensive plan. The final plan was on a north–south, east–west grid. As it evolved (although not obvious on the ground) it was decided that the east–west streets would be individual houses and north–south streets were flatted. Businesses (shops etc.) were restricted to the north–south streets. The plan came to fruition in 1802, Sibbald being assisted by the much younger Robert Reid who largely designed the frontages. The area is now known as the Second New Town: extending from Heriot Row to Fettes Row.

In 1794 he was elected a town burgess under the title of "William Sibbald, mason".

In 1800 he is listed as a builder living at 29 South Castle Street. The building had been built by the builder John Hamilton (d.1812) the uncle of Thomas Hamilton.

The Second New Town was largely built on virgin ground and no significant demolitions were required. The only major house, Bellevue Lodge, the home of Major General John Scott, was retained as a centrepiece to what became Drummond Place. Although speculative the scheme proved enormously popular and rapidly developed, despite the relatively high cost of properties. It became the home to Edinburgh's rich and famous.

He died on 29 March 1809. He is buried in the secular graveyard at Old Calton Burial Ground. The family vault lies in the southern section with its back to the Old Town.

== Second New Town ==
Edinburgh's Second New Town (north of Queen Street Gardens) was created from 1802 onwards following the huge success of the First New Town (Princes Street to Queen Street). It was largely complete by 1825 apart from corner blocks. The builder was mainly John Paton (father of David Paton) and David Lind. North–south streets are built as tenements, often with ground floor shops. East–west streets are built as town-houses but now mainly split into flats due to their size. In terms of a single "building project" this is one of the largest early 19th century schemes in Britain, and is the more remarkable in that it is practically intact after 200 years.

The area was developed during the height of the Napoleonic Wars. Although not immediately obvious the streets are named after people and incidents in the war, the patriotic events of 1803 to 1808:

- Abercrombie Place – after Ralph Abercrombie – later changed to Abercromby Place
- Albany Street/Duke Street/York Place – after Prince Frederick, Duke of York and Albany, the official commander-in-chief of the British Army – Duke St was later included as part of a lengthened Dublin St... Albany street was Albany Row for its first 20 years
- Cornwallis Place - after General Cornwallis
- Duncan Street – after Admiral Duncan – later renamed Dundonald Street after the Earl of Dundonald
- Dundas Street – either after General Ralph Dundas or after Admiral James Whitley Deans Dundas due to his then infamous recent recapture of Copenhagen, but also conveniently linking to the prominent Edinburgh Dundas family
- Fettes Row - after William Fettes, Lord Provost of Edinburgh 1804 to 1806
- Howe Street – after Admiral Howe
- Nelson Street – after Admiral Nelson
- Northumberland Street – after HMS Northumberland, Admiral Howe's flagship
- Pitt Street – after the prime minister, William Pitt, renumbered and included as part of Dundas Street in the 1960s
- St Vincent Street – after Nelson's victory at the Battle of Cape St. Vincent (1797)

The exception to this pattern is Heriot Row, which is an acknowledgement of the Heriot Trust, who were the principal landowner.

== William Sibbald Jr ==
In 1820 he is listed as living at 5 Charlotte Place off Charlotte Square and was partner at the same address of the architects Sibbald & Smith.

He died on 17 November 1823 and was buried with his father.

== Buildings of note ==
- St Andrews Parish Church Edinburgh (1785)
- Beechwood House, Corstorphine (1799)
- 1-19 Heriot Row, Edinburgh (1802)
- Second New Town of Edinburgh (1802 to 1808) with Robert Reid
- Lady Yester's Church, Edinburgh (1803)
- Portobello Baths (1805) – not the current baths
- Portobello Parish Church (1808)
- Bank of Scotland main office (1802–1806) father and son
- St Michael’s Parish Church Steeple (1805) Inveresk, Scotland (Duke of Buccleuch - Major Patron)
