= Old Calton Burial Ground =

Cemetery in Edinburgh, Scotland

Old Calton Cemetery
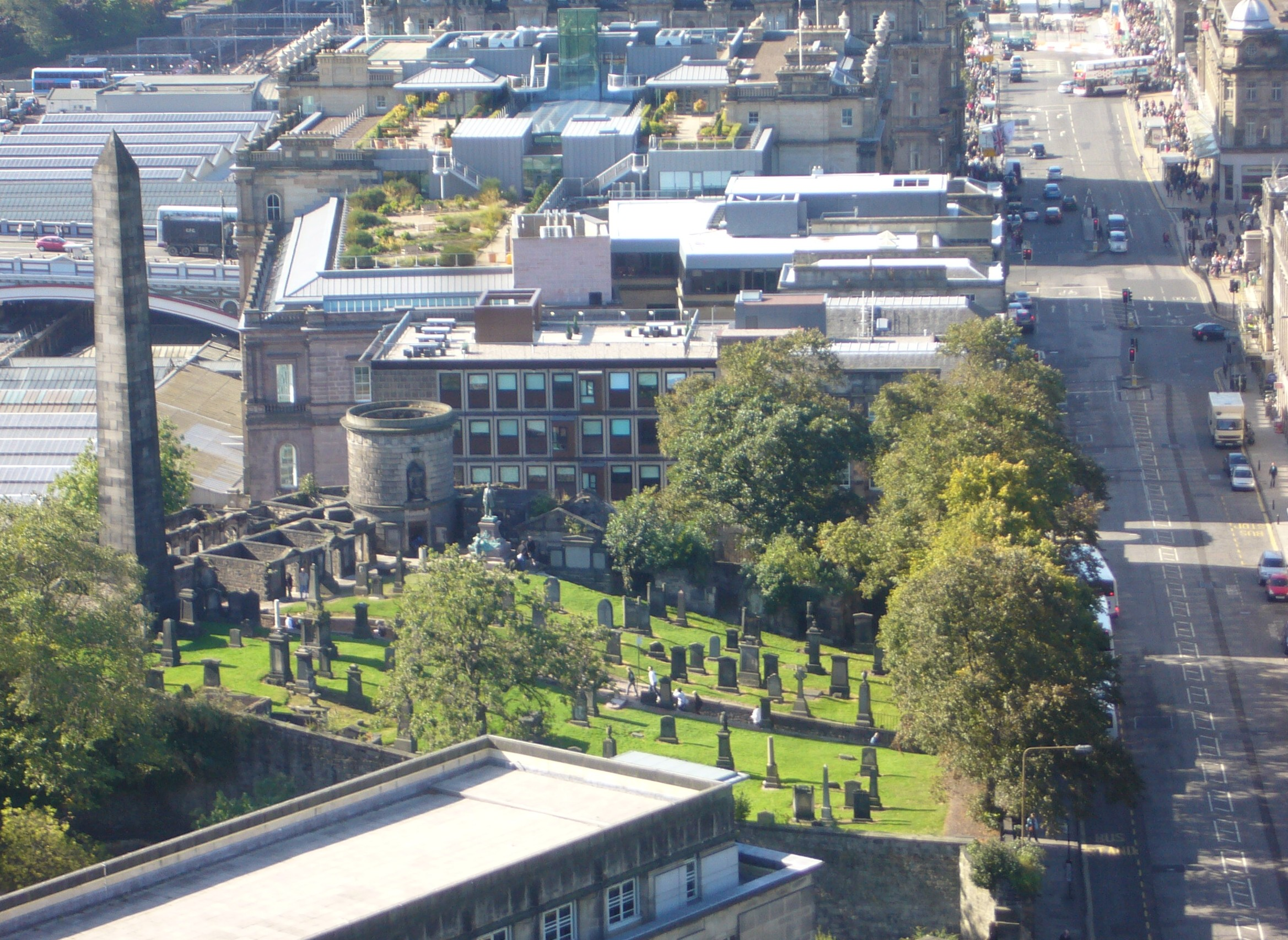
- Interactive map of Old Calton Cemetery

Details
- Established: 1718
- Location: Calton Hill, Edinburgh
- Country: Scotland
- Coordinates: 55.9536°N 3.1859°W
- Type: Public
- Owned by: City of Edinburgh Council

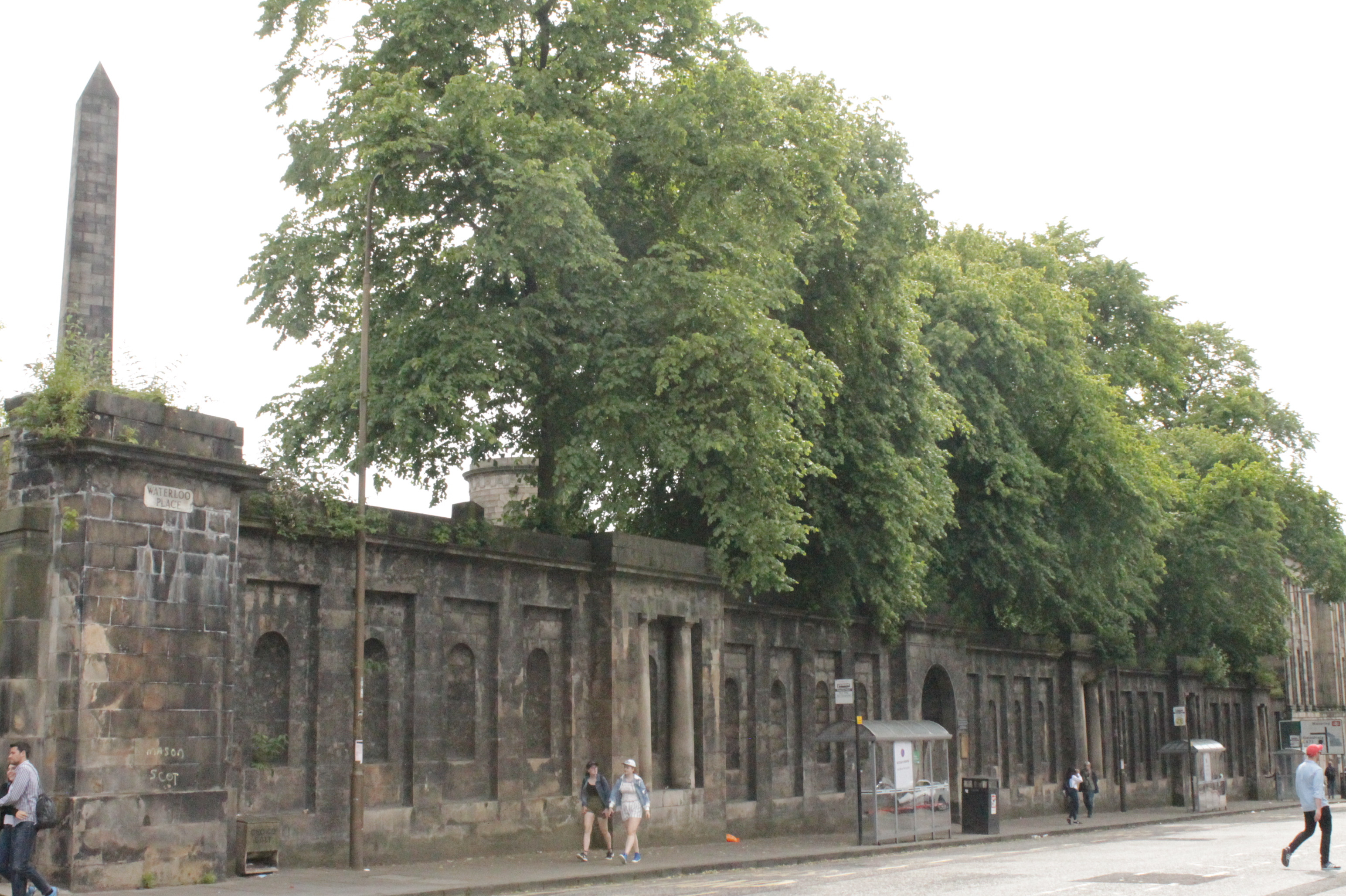
The main screen wall to Old Calton Burial Ground on Waterloo Place

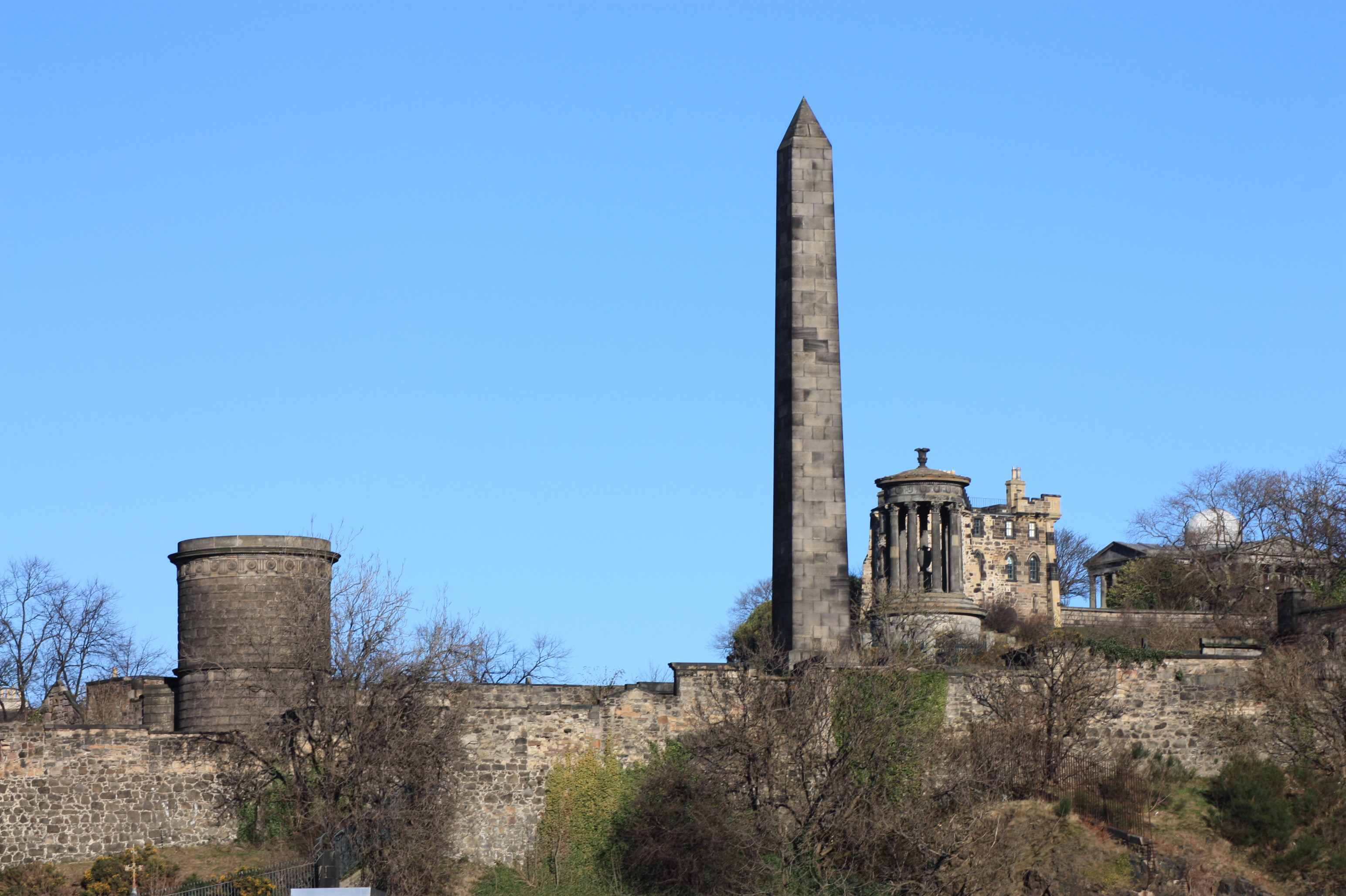
Old Calton Burial Ground as seen from the south

The Old Calton Burial Ground is a cemetery in Edinburgh, Scotland. It is located on Calton Hill to the north-east of the city centre. The burial ground was opened in 1718, and is the resting place of several notable Scots, including philosopher David Hume, scientist John Playfair, rival publishers William Blackwood and Archibald Constable, and clergyman Dr Robert Candlish. It is also the site of the Political Martyrs' Monument, an obelisk erected to the memory of a number of political reformers, and Scotland's American Civil War Memorial.

The burial ground was altered following the construction of Waterloo Place in 1819, which divided the graveyard into two sections. Along with Edinburgh's other historic graveyards, Old Calton is managed by City of Edinburgh Council. The burial ground, including screen walls, and its monuments are protected as a category A listed building.

== History ==
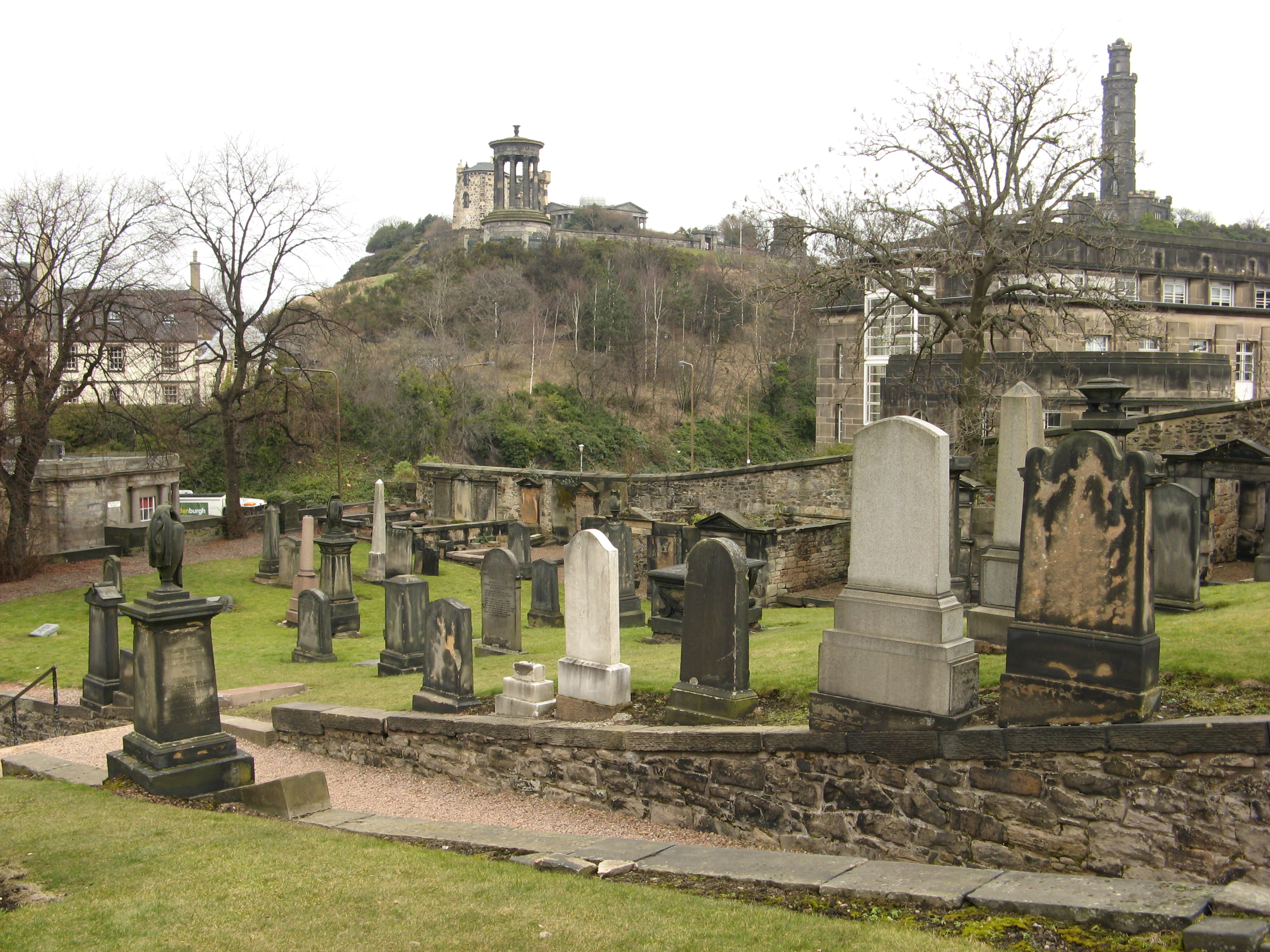
Old Calton Cemetery, looking towards Calton Hill

The villagers of Calton, a village at the western base of Calton Hill, buried their dead at South Leith Parish Church. This was so inconvenient that, in 1718, the Society of the Incorporated Trades of Calton bought a half acre of ground at a cost of £1013 from Lord Balmerino, the feudal superior of the land, for use as a burial ground for the village. Permission was granted for an access road, originally known as High Calton and now the street called Calton Hill, up the steep hill from the village to the burial ground.

The Society of the Trades of Calton expanded the burial ground a number of times. Burials ceased in 1869 but the Society remained in control until 1888. A new road, named Waterloo Place after the contemporary victory at Waterloo, was approved in 1814 and built between 1815 and 1819. This road cut through the existing graveyard, requiring major removal of bodies and stones which was done with a high degree of respect, bones being carefully grouped and wrapped for removal to New Calton Burial Ground, 0.5 kilometres (0.31 mi) eastwards, where several of the more substantial stones were also re-erected. These transported stones belie the age of that burial ground, as it is odd to find 18th-century stones in a 19th-century cemetery. Due to the cut, a small section of the graveyard is isolated to the north side of Waterloo Place, and is accessed from Calton Hill (the street). The building to its east, part of Archibald Elliot's Waterloo Place development, was originally the Calton Convening Rooms for the Incorporated Trades of Calton built as a replacement for their old convening rooms, which were demolished to make way for Waterloo Place and the Regent Bridge.

In 1795, Herman Lion (one of several versions of his name), a Jewish dentist and chiropodist of German nationality who had moved to Scotland in 1788 and who could not be buried in a Christian graveyard, petitioned the Town Council of Edinburgh for a small piece of ground as a burial ground for himself and his family. A council minute of 6 May 1795 records that the Council agreed to convey to Lion a piece of ground on Calton Hill for seventeen pounds sterling. The location of this burial ground is indicated on the 1852 Ordnance Survey map as "Jews' Burial Vault (Lyons Family)" just outside the north wall of William Henry Playfair's City Observatory.

== Monuments and burials ==
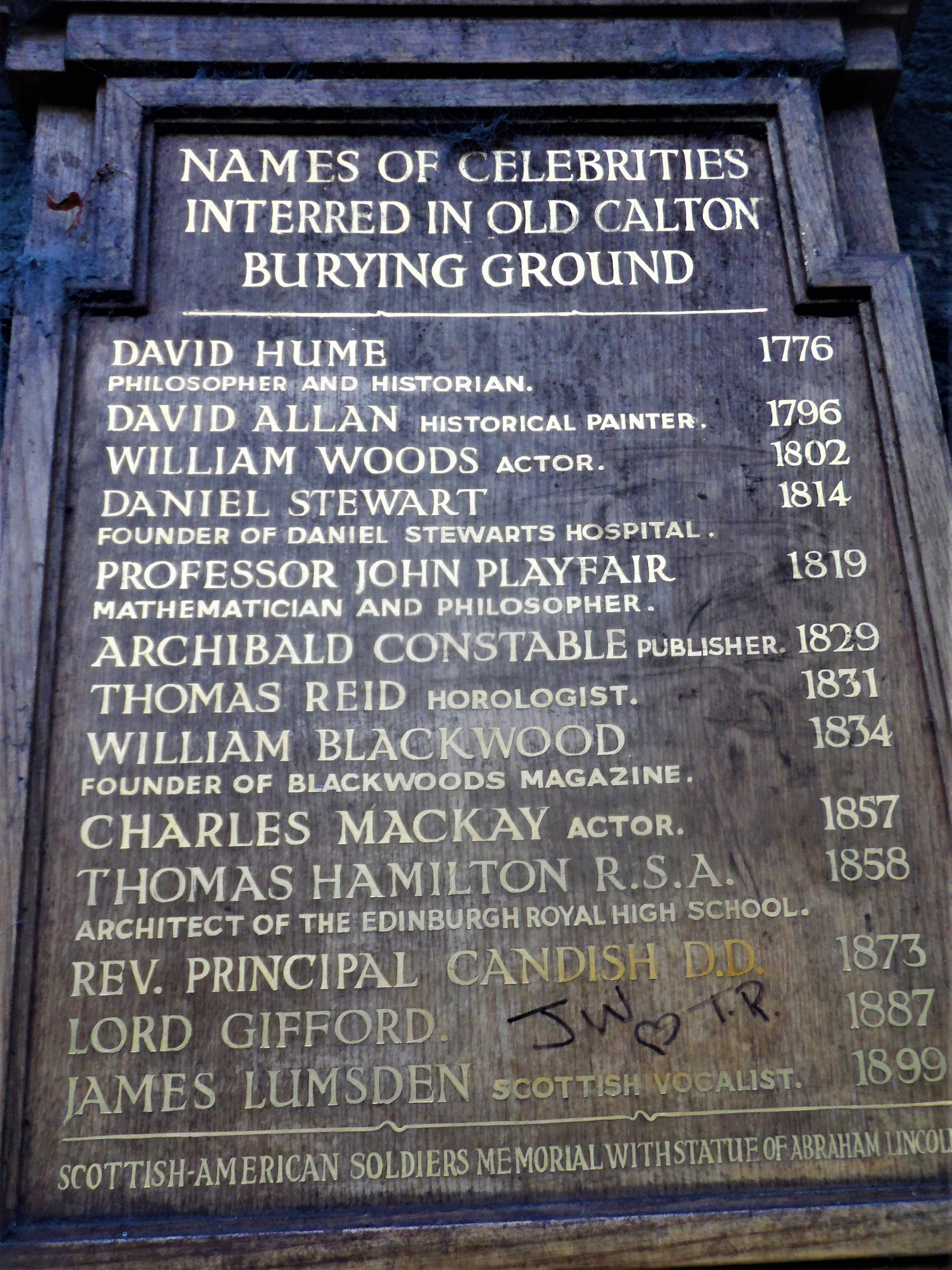
List of notable burials

=== Martyrs' Monument ===
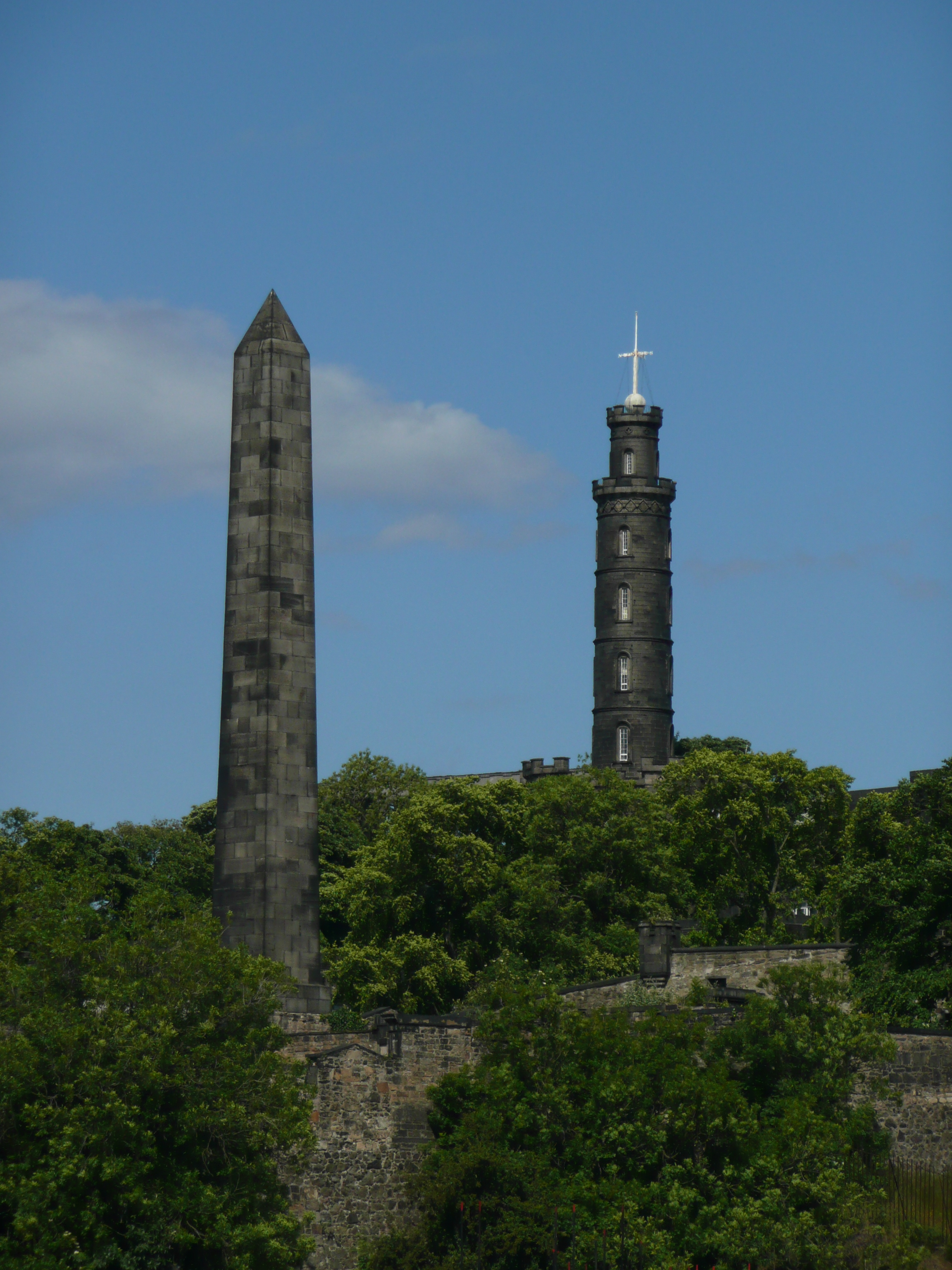
Martyrs' Monument, with the Nelson Monument behind.

In 1793 several members of The Friends of the People, an early universal suffrage movement, were brought to trial and sentenced to 14 years' deportation, being charged before Lord Braxfield with "unconscious sedition" and treason for attempting to correspond with the French. Their true crime in the eyes of the judges was to push for universal suffrage, and the rights of the common man to control his destiny, i.e. voting rights for all, not just landowners. The men became known as the Chartist Martyrs. Thomas Muir of Huntershill was their leading figure, and he, along with four others who followed him, was banished to Botany Bay in Australia on 30 August 1793.

The huge obelisk (designed by Thomas Hamilton buried just behind), clearly visible from many central Edinburgh viewpoints, is the focal point of Old Calton Burial Ground, and was erected in their memory. The choice of this site is probably linked to the graveyard's lack of affiliation to any church, and prominent position. There is no known connection between any of the martyrs and Calton parish. The inscription reads:

To the memory of Thomas Muir, Thomas Fyshe-Palmer, William Skirving, Maurice Margarot, and Joseph Gerrald, erected by the Friends of Parliamentary Reform in England and Scotland 1844.

I have devoted myself to the cause of the people, it is a good cause – it shall ultimately prevail – it shall finally triumph – speech of Thomas Muir in the Court of Justiciary on the 30th August 1793.

I know that what has been done these two days will be re-judged – speech of William Skirving on the 7th January 1794.

The Scottish Reform Act 1832 eventually brought about their aim, and the men were pardoned in 1838. The monument was erected some 50 years after their stand, but was inspired by the Reform Act brought about by their original actions.

=== Scottish-American Soldiers Monument ===
(See also: List of statues of Abraham Lincoln)

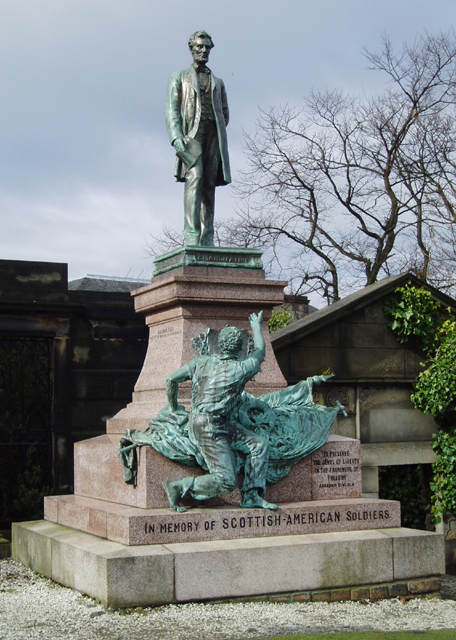
Scottish-American Soldiers Monument

The American Civil War Memorial, also known as the Scottish-American Soldiers Monument, was dedicated on 21 August 1893 to Scots who fought and died in the American Civil War. Depicting a standing figure of Abraham Lincoln, with a freed slave giving thanks at his feet, it is a focal point of the burial ground, located just in front of Hume's tomb.

It is the only monument to the American Civil War outside the United States and was the first statue to a US president outside her own borders. It is the only statue of Lincoln in Scotland.

Sculptures were by George Edwin Bissell and stonework by Stewart McGlashan & Son. The base consists of polished red Aberdeen granite, 9 feet in height. A bronze shield bears the old US flag, and is wreathed in thistles to the left, and cotton to the right. Two regimental flags lie furled, the battle being over. The black man holds a book, indicating that he is not only free, he is also now educated. The monument was erected at American expense to a small group of Scots (only one of whom, William Duff, is buried under the monument, the rest being nearby) to whom it felt indebted, and wished their graves to be marked, despite their later poverty. They had all fought for the Union (the North) in the American Civil War. The inscription, "To preserve the jewel of liberty in the framework of Freedom" is a quotation from the writings of Abraham Lincoln.

Those interred and commemorated are:

- Sergeant Major John McEwan, Company H, 65th Regiment Illinois Volunteer Infantry
- Lt Col William L. Duff, 2nd Regiment Illinois Volunteer Light Artillery (died of wounds on return to Edinburgh)
- Robert Steedman, Company E, 5th Regiment Maine Volunteer Infantry
- James Wilkie, Company C, 1st Regiment Michigan Volunteer Cavalry
- Robert Ferguson, Company F, 57th New York Volunteer Infantry
- Alexander Smith, Company G, 66th Regiment New York Volunteer Infantry (this name was added in 1993 following research)

The following appears in the Town Council records

Act of Council 32, Edinburgh 1st Sept 1892 The Magistrates and Council having on a letter from the United States Consul (Mr Wallace Bruce) of 25 July 1892. Signified their approval of a proposal made by him that a burying place should be provided for certain old pensioned American soldiers in the Old Calton burying ground, the Plans and Works Committee acting under remit with powers, beg to report that they have fixed, as a site, a piece of ground 14 feet by 14 feet or thereby, in the Old Calton Burial Ground about 16 feet or thereby north of David Hume’s monument.

Five thousand dollars was subscribed in one-hundred dollar subscriptions from fifty gentlemen including:

Levi P Morton, Cornelius Vanderbilt, Andrew Carnegie, John S Kennedy, William Rockefeller, J. Pierpont Morgan, William Waldorf Astor, John Sloane, George Peabody Wetmore, Daniel Appleton Harper & Brothers, J. Kennedy Tod, John B. Dutcher, Solomon Turok, Caledonian Club, and Henderson Brothers of New York, David A Boody, John Arbuckle, Henry R. Heath, Francis H. Wilson, Andrew D. Baird, Andrew R Baird, Alexander S. Baird, William W. Baird and Joseph Stewart of Brooklyn, E. C. Benedict of Greenwich Conn.; James Benedict of Norwalk Conn.; Lynde Harrison of New Haven, Conn; John Beattie of Leete's Island, Conn.; Henry L Young, Andrew Smith, John Donald, and Wallace Bruce of Poughkeepsie, N.Y.; Peter Kinnear of Albany, N.Y.; George Munger of Fishkill, N.Y.; S. D. Coykendall of Rondout, N.Y.; J. Watts de Peyster of Tivoli, N.Y.; Edwin B. Sheldon of Delhi, N.Y.; E. Lemon and Nathan Bickford of Washington, D.C.; R. B. Leuchare and Henry Norwell of Boston, Mass.; W. J. Murphy of Phoenix, Arizona; J. B. White and friends of Fort Wayne, Ind.; Mr. McDonald of Cincinnati, Ohio; Thomas Waddell of West Pittston, Penn.; and George W. Childs of Philadelphia.

It was the widow of Sgt Major McEwan who originally initiated the request by writing a letter of complaint to the United States government.

=== Tradesmen's monuments ===
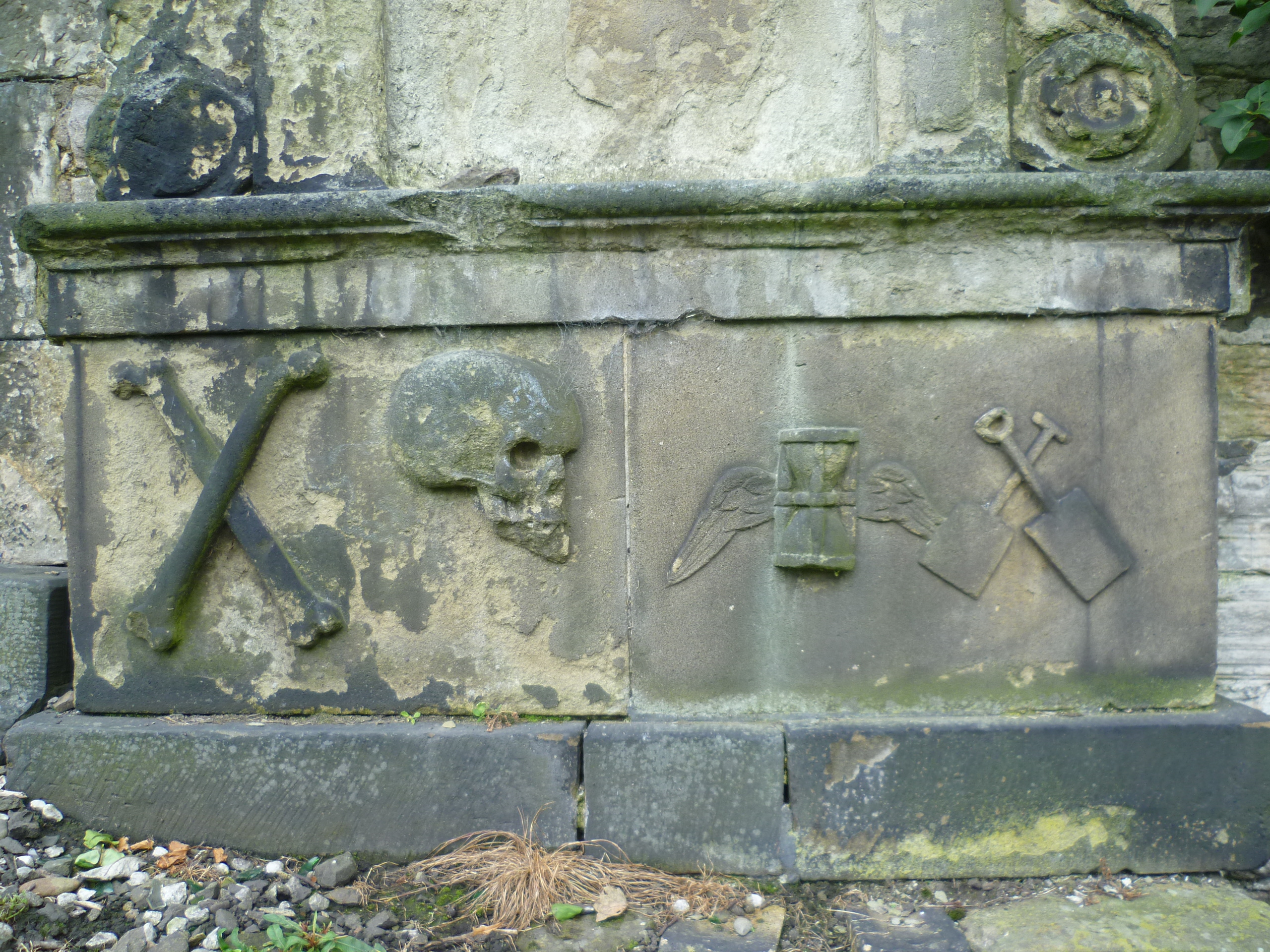
Graveyard symbols at Old Calton

A number of 18th-century monuments to local tradesmen are interesting for their detailed carving. The largest and most elaborate of these is that of John Morton, heelmaker, who died in 1728, aged 54. Although a long inscription is given, the stone is more notable for its form and decoration. It has a portico-style frame, with a pediment bearing a crest with two lions rampant. Two carved female figures flank the monument, exposing their breasts and holding a book open to view.

Another stone, dated 1762, bears a skull and the motto "Memento Mori", with an hourglass lying on its side, indicating the sands of life have stopped, as well as crossed bones and crossed turf cutter and spade, the tools of the sexton indicating more symbols of mortality together they remind us that death will come to us all. It is inscribed "Here lyes Margrat Thomson, spous to James Forsyth, shoemecker in Calton. She died Apl 30th 1760 and aged 43 years & allso 8th of her children".

=== David Allan ===
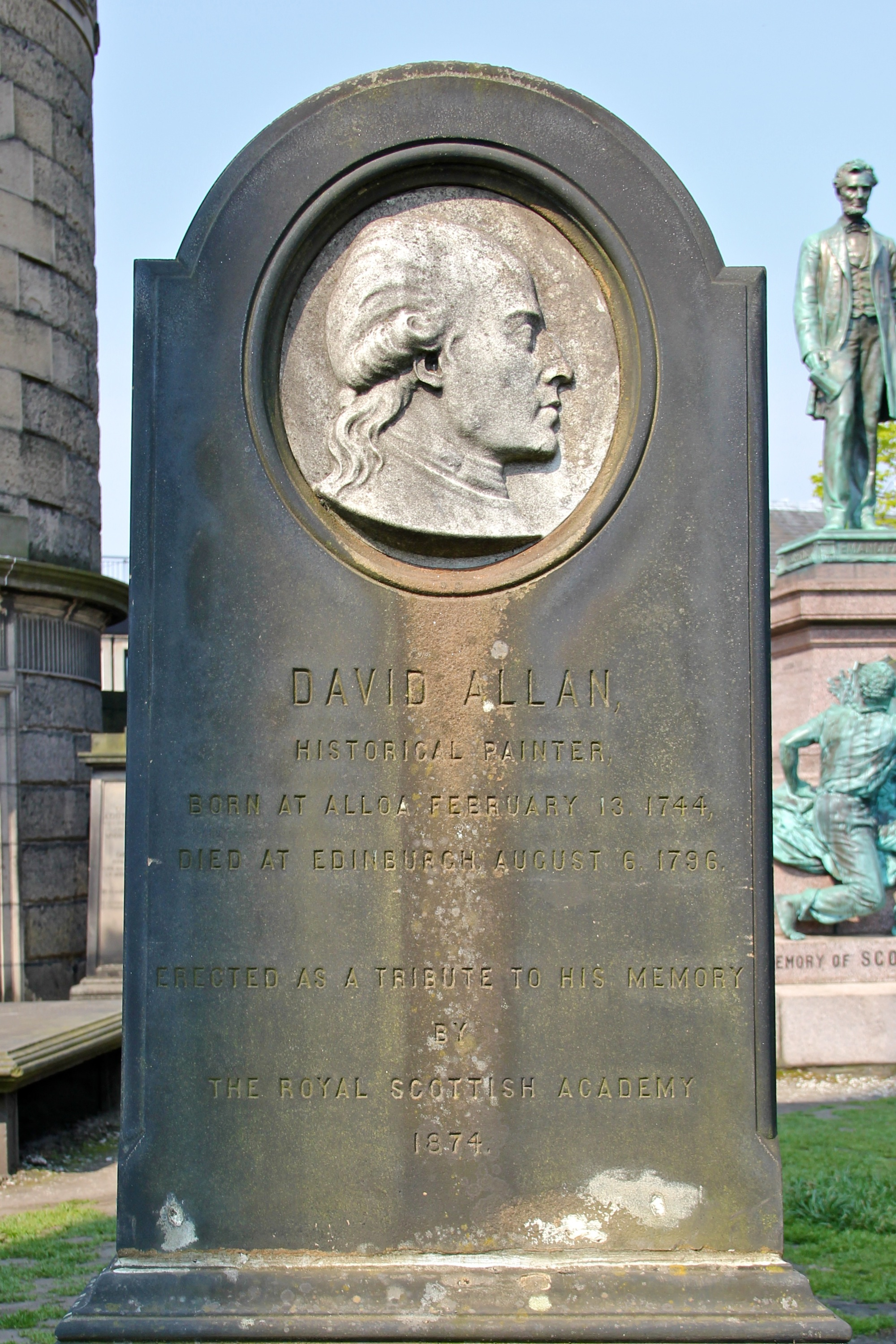
The headstone on David Allan's grave

Even from an early age, the painter David Allan (1744–1796) showed artistic talent, being expelled from school for caricaturing a master. Known as "the Scottish Hogarth", he illustrated The Gentle Shepherd by Allan Ramsay and importantly much of Robert Burns' work. His grave was originally unmarked. The headstone was erected in 1874, almost 80 years after his death, by the Royal Scottish Academy, and includes a profile medallion insert of his likeness by John Hutchison.

=== David Hume ===
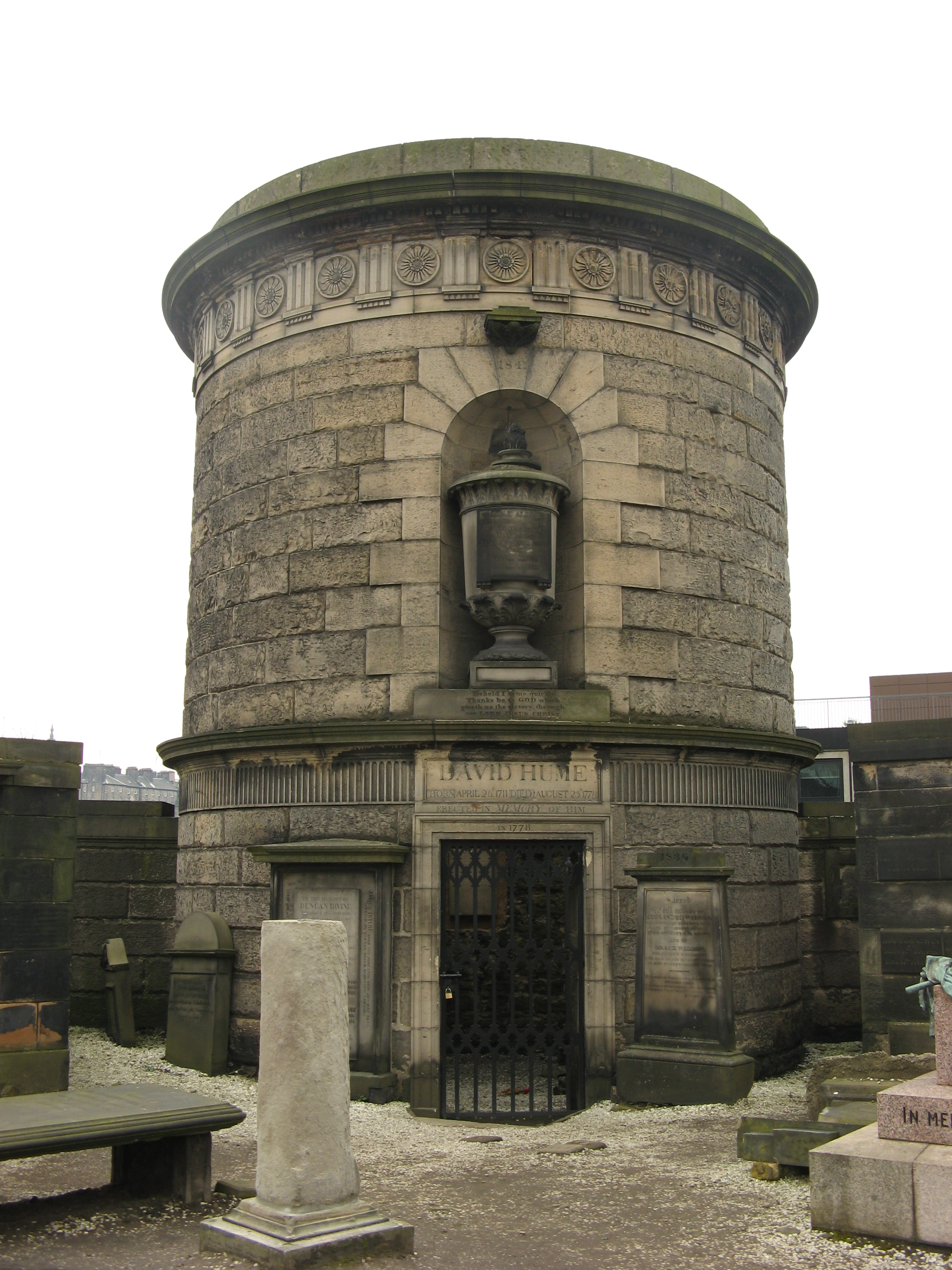
David Hume Mausoleum by Robert Adam

Historian and philosopher David Hume (1711–1776), author of Treatise of Human Nature, was a household name across Europe in the 18th century, and a critical figure in the Scottish Enlightenment. He was a strong influence on many other thinkers and public figures, Adam Smith among them. However, his grave had to be guarded for 8 days after burial, due to strong public hostility towards him at the time of his death, largely due to his professed atheism.

In his will Hume requested that a "Monument be built over my body ... with an Inscription containing only my Name and the Year of my Birth and Death, leaving it to Posterity to add the Rest." The tomb is a large cylindrical tower on the Edinburgh skyline. It was designed by Robert Adam in 1777. While Hume was not religious, leading to his being buried in this non-denominational site, other family members did not hold his views. His niece is also interred here and she added a particularly Christian sentiment to her panel, which reads "Behold, I come quickly, thanks be to God which giveth us the victory through our Lord Jesus Christ".

Hume's home, between 1771 and 1776, was relatively close by, on the corner of St David Street and St Andrew Square, but that location has never been visible from Hume's tomb (as some claim).

=== John Gray's stone ===
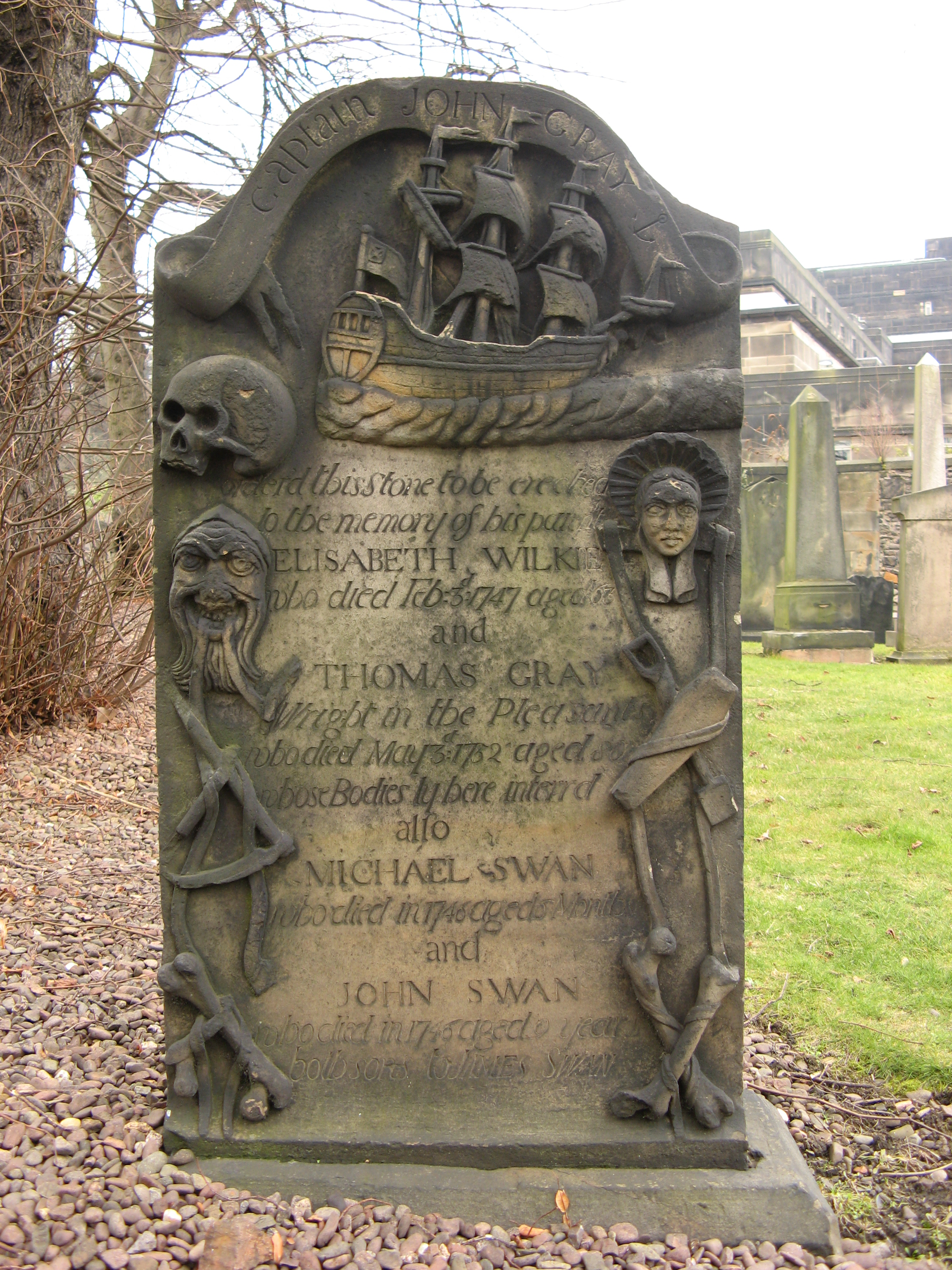
John Gray's stone

The very well-carved stone erected by Captain John Gray in memory of his parents, c1760, is in excellent condition, and is arguably the most interesting in the whole burial ground. It is inscribed with his name and then a carved anchor, beneath which is a carving of a 3-masted ship, flying the ensign, shown in bold relief. Down the left side of the stone is a death head and bearded, male head wearing a cap, which could presumably refer to his father. From the mouth spill two ribbons that link symbols of mortality: The King of Terrors main weapon of death, the scythe, is crossed with another implement, most likely a lance or dart, both of which are favoured symbols to be crossed with a scythe in funeral art; below, crossed bones. Down the right side is a female head, wearing a bonnet (his mother). Ribbons from the bonnet link again to symbols of mortality: a spade crossed (Tool of the sexton) with a coffin, and again crossed bones.

=== John Leishman McDougall VC ===
This very recently erected stone commemorates John McDougall (VC) (1840–1869), a soldier awarded the Victoria Cross for his infiltration of Taku Forts during the Second China War. The medal was later stolen from his home and its whereabouts are unknown.

=== Charles Mackay ===
Charles Mackay (1787-1857), comedian and actor, was particularly distinguished in his portrayal of the character of Baillie Nicol Jarvie, and other characters of Walter Scott's invention or adaption (most famously as Rob Roy). Mackay is allegedly the figure referred to in the phrase "the real McCoy".

In the 1830s Charles Mackay of the Theatre Royal is listed as living at 23 Dublin Street in the New Town.

He was born in Edinburgh but died in Glasgow. He was portrayed by Sir Daniel Macnee.

=== William Woods ===
From about 1772 to 1802 William Woods was the favourite and leading actor on the Edinburgh stage. The main marble tablet is eroded and illegible; a new inscription has been added to the rear, which reads "Re-erected 1866 by a few gentlemen who thought it well that the last resting place should not be forgotten of one who contributed largely to the enjoyments of his fellow creatures and whose taste and talents recommended him to the friendship of the poets, Fergusson and Burns".

Life’s but a walking shadow – a poor player that struts and frets his hour upon the stage and then is heard no more. William Shakespeare, Macbeth, V, v.

Pity it is that the momentary beauties flowing from an harmonious elocution cannot, like those of poetry, be their own record, that the animated graces of the player can live no longer than the instant breath and motion that presents them or at best can faintly glimmer through the memory of imperfect attestation of a few surviving spectators. Colley Cibber, Shakespeare in the Theatre.

=== John Haig ===
The Scots distiller John Haig is buried here, together with several members of the Haig whisky family. Haig is of most note for being instrumental in the enterprising promotion of whisky at the failure of the wine and brandy market in the late 19th century. As part of this venture he effectively invented blended whisky and turned whisky in Scotland into a true industry rather than a practice simply supplying local needs. The family business later became United Distillers. John Haig was the father of Field Marshal Lord Douglas Haig, of World War One fame. The latter does not lie in this family vault but is buried at Dryburgh Abbey.

=== Dr Robert Candlish ===
Dr Robert Candlish (1806–1873) was a clergyman and leader of the Disruption of the Scottish Church in 1843, when 470 ministers rose during the General Assembly, and left never to return due to growing differences of opinion on how the church was practicing. Together with Rev Thomas Chalmers he set up the Free Church of Scotland. Dr Candlish was previously minister of St George's Parish Church. He was a fervent author of religious books, and became Moderator of the Free Church in 1861. The Free Churches lost their right to burial in the parish churchyards due to the split. Most new churches are in restricted urban areas and most lack burial ground. Consequently, most Free Church members had to rely on burial grounds for burial. In this instance, Candlish has chosen to be buried in this more traditional, but still effectively non-denominational graveyard. His stone makes no mention of his achievements.

James Candlish, his father, was a medical lecturer in Edinburgh University and is also buried here. He was a friend of Robert Burns, who in 1791 described him as "the earliest friend, except me only brother, that I have on earth, and one of the worthiest fellows that ever any man called by the name of friend". Jean Smith, James' wife and Robert's mother, was one of the "Belles of Mauchline" referred to by Burns.

=== Thomas Hamilton ===
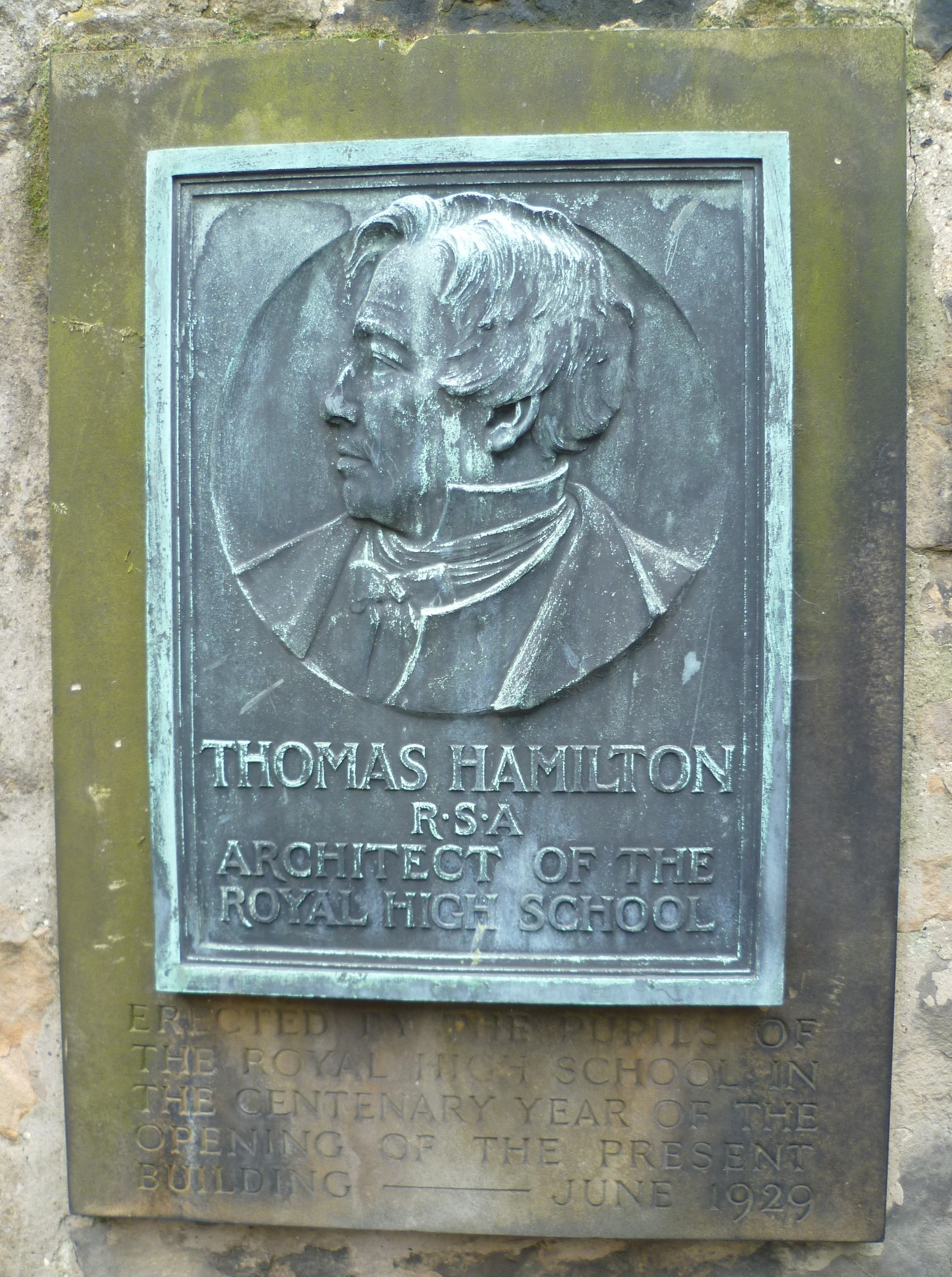
Hamilton plaque

Thomas Hamilton RSA (1784–1858), was architect of the Royal High School building on Regent Road, the Bank of Scotland on the Mound, Physicians Hall on Queen Street, the Dean Gallery, and many other notable buildings, mainly in Edinburgh and Ayrshire. He co-founded the Royal Scottish Academy (RSA) in 1826. His monument is relatively recent and he was previously undeclared within his family vault. There is now a bronze plaque bearing his likeness on the rear wall of the vault, having been erected by the pupils of the Royal High School on the centenary of the building of the school, June 1929. The stone in front of this vault has interesting Masonic iconography.

Curiously, in terms of the juxtaposition, he was architect of the Martyrs' Monument just a few yards north of his grave.

=== Daniel Stewart ===
Daniel Stewart (1741–1814) was the founder of Daniel Stewart's Hospital, one of Edinburgh's leading schools. This later became Daniel Stewart's College before merging with another school to form Stewart's Melville College. His sealed tomb has a heavy-studded timber door.

=== William Blackwood ===
William Blackwood (1776–1834), publisher and magistrate, was the founder of the Edinburgh Encyclopedia and Blackwood's Edinburgh Magazine. He was Sir Walter Scott's publisher for many years. The tomb is an enclosed vault with decorative iron gate.

=== Archibald Constable ===
Book collector and publisher Archibald Constable (1774–1827) was a rival of Blackwood, and also published Scott's work (Scott shopped around as he was not popular with publishers), advising him to publish the Waverley novels. Constable started to collect books from an early age, and was apprenticed to a bookseller at 14. By 1795 (aged 21) he had his own bookshop. In 1798 he began his notable career as a publisher. He founded Farmer's Magazine (1800), took over the Scots Magazine (1801), founded the Edinburgh Review (1802) and obtained the publishing rights to the Encyclopædia Britannica (1812). The bankruptcy of Scott and the Ballantyne brothers took Constable with them for a while, as all were linked. This large simplistic monument bears his head in bronze and the date of death but says nothing of his achievements.

Constable's nephew lies some yards to the west against the dividing wall. He was a lawyer of no huge note, but the monument has an interesting detail. A small oval medallion at the base contains the motif of a caterpillar changing into a butterfly, symbolic of the soul leaving the body. The inscription is in Greek.

=== Robert Burn ===
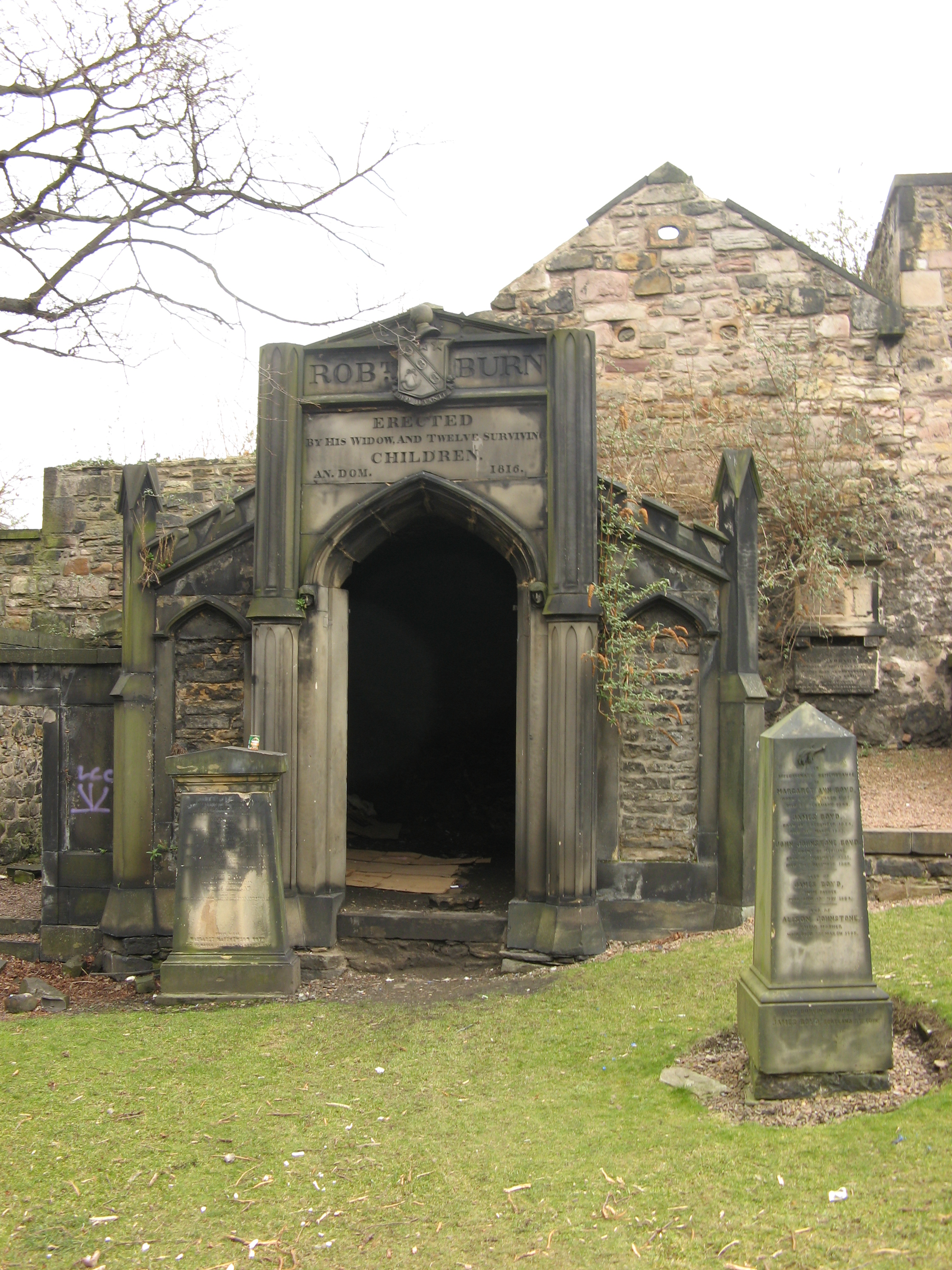
Robert Burn mausoleum by William Burn

The work of architect Robert Burn (1752–1815) includes Nelson's Monument on Calton Hill. This imposing family vault says nothing of his works. He was a respected architect by most, but not by his near-namesake Robert Burns, who commissioned Burn to erect a monument over the grave of his hero and inspiration, the poet Robert Fergusson who died in the poorhouse and is buried in Canongate Kirkyard, visible from the southern reaches of Old Calton. Such commissions were normal, as many architects specialised in funerary monuments. On this occasion Burns was less than happy, as he indicated in a letter: "Five pounds ten shillings per account, I owe Mr R Burn, architect, for erecting the stone over the grave of poor Fergusson. He was two years in erecting it after I had commissioned him for it, and I have been two years in paying him after he sent me his account, so he and I are quits!" Both William and John Burn, his sons, were also eminent architects. John is also buried here, but with no specific memorial. The monument itself is designed by his first son, William Burn, who is buried in Kensal Green Cemetery in London.

=== Julius Von Yelin ===
The German knight and scholar Julius Conrad Von Yelin (1771-1826) came to Scotland to visit Sir Walter Scott, but died before the event, partly due to Scott's prolonged confinement, due to illness brought on by his bankruptcy. They "met" for the first time when Scott attended his funeral: " – and now his funeral will be the first public place that I shall appear at – he dead and I ruined. This is what you call a meeting." This was Scott's first public appearance following his woes. The stone postdates the funeral by a century.

=== John Playfair ===
Professor John Playfair (1748–1819) was an important mathematician and scientist of his day. He was brother to architect James Playfair and engineer William Playfair, as well as uncle of the architect William Henry Playfair. He was a close friend of James Hutton. Originally unmarked, his grave, immediately adjacent to Yelin's, was marked by a plaque unveiled in 2011. Playfair's monument (designed by William Henry Playfair) stands on Calton Hill rather than on his grave, and can be seen from the north section of the graveyard.

=== Peter Williamson ===
Peter Williamson (1730–1799), nicknamed "Indian Peter", was a colourful character born near Aberdeen. He was kidnapped and sold into slavery at the age of 13, and is one of the few well-documented examples of the early white slave trade. Peter escaped, and lived with Native Americans ("Indians") for some years (hence his nickname). He returned to Scotland and successfully sued Aberdeen Town Council for its part in his enslavement. This made him into a relatively rich man for his day. Partly backed by this cash he set up several enterprises, most notably the first Edinburgh Penny Post in 1773, which was usefully linked to one of the world's first street directories. He is buried in the Scott family grave along with his daughter Agnes Williamson Scott who married into the Scott family, however Peter Williamson's name does not appear on the monument.

=== Sir John Steell ===
Sir John Steell (1804–1891) acclaimed Scottish sculptor is buried in an unmarked grave in one of the family vaults to the side.

=== Others ===
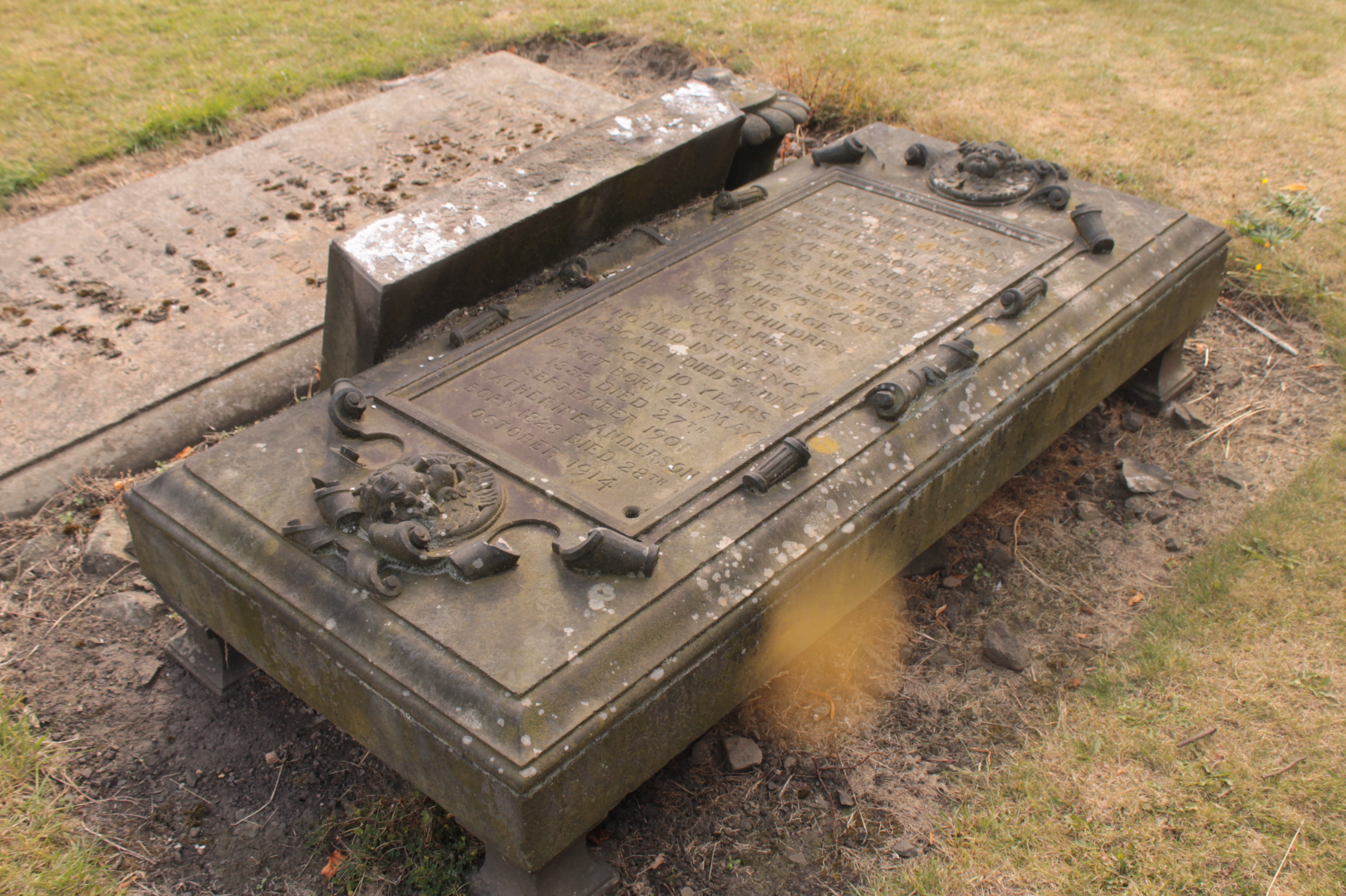
The grave of Rowand Anderson's parents, Old Calton Burial Ground

Other burials include James Lumsden (1836–1899), a well-known singer of his day, Richard Dickson (1792–1857) architect, Thomas Dickson (antiquary) (1825-1904), William Sibbald (d. 1809) architect, Robert Kay (1740–1818) architect, and Prof George Wilson MD (1818–1859), a text book author and biographer. Betty Morton's monument was erected by Archibald Campbell Tait (1811–1882), Archbishop of Canterbury, in memory of his nanny. Iron tablets, such as the one to John and David Paton (builders of much of the Edinburgh New Town), c1830, were in vogue for a decade or two, and it was not realised how badly these items would weather. This one is in surprisingly good condition, and is still legible. The Paton's business rival of William Lunn (builder of Great King Street etc.) also lies here.

Thomas Smith (1752–1815) lighthouse engineer and step-father to Robert Stevenson (civil engineer) lies to the north-east.

Robert Kay (1740-1818) architect of the South Bridge scheme.

Margaret Rowand and James Anderson, the parents of Robert Rowand Anderson with a table stone to his design.

Rev John Barclay (1734-1798) founder of the Beran church is buried here, but the location is not clear.

William Sibbald and his son, architects of the Second New Town.

Margaret Rowand and James Anderson SSC, the parents of Rowand Anderson with a table stone to his design.
