= David Steuart (Lord Provost) =

Scottish merchant, banker and bibliophile

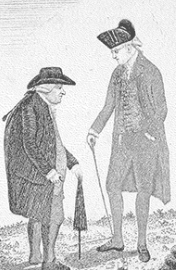
Bailie Lothian with Provost David Steuart by John Kay

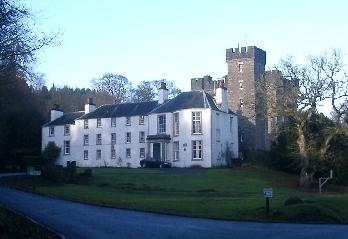
Dalguise House

David Steuart or Stewart (1747–1824) was an 18th/19th century Scottish merchant, banker and bibliophile who served as Lord Provost of Edinburgh from 1780 to 1782.

== Life ==
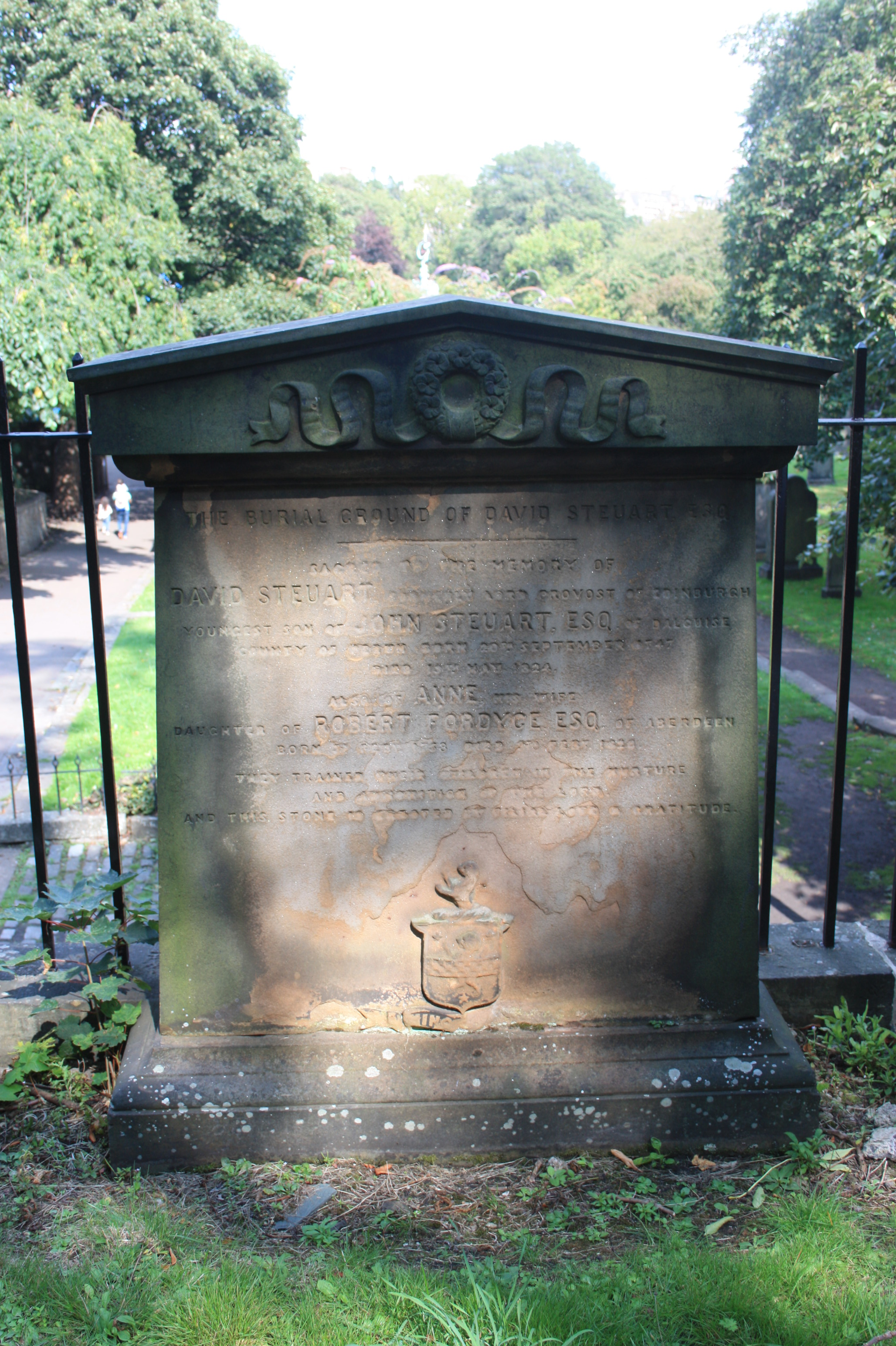
The grave of David Steuart, Lord Provost of Edinburgh, St Cuthberts Churchyard

He was born on 20 September 1747 the youngest son of John Steuart of Dalguise (1689-1776). He was probably born at Dalguise House, north of Dunkeld in Perthshire. His mother was John's second wife, Margaret Findlay

He came to Edinburgh probably around 1760. He went into partnership with Robert Allan around 1770 creating the banking firm of Allan & Steuart.

He served as both a Councillor (1778) and Bailie (1779) in Edinburgh prior to becoming Lord Provost in 1780. He was succeeded in 1782 by John Grieve.

In 1784 he was living at 5 Queen Street in Edinburgh's New Town.

In 1790 he commissioned William Sibbald to create a plan for a large swathe of land owned by Steuart between Gabriels Road and Lord Moray's estate to the west. He persuaded the council to purchase the land east of Gabriels Road (centred on Bellevue Lodge) to enlarge the proposal. From 1802 to 1809 Sibbald developed this area as what is now known as the Second New Town, aided by Robert Reid who oversaw elevational design.

One of his most notable acts as Lord Provost was commissioning John Ainslie to map Edinburgh. He was portrayed with Bailie John Lothian by John Kay around 1781.

He broke his partnership with Robert Allan and set up as a merchant in Leith. He later returned to Edinburgh as a spirit dealer. In later life he is often shown as David Stewart. He ran David Stewart & Co at Giles Street in Leith.

From 1815 he lived with his son-in-law at Gretna Hall near Annan in Dumfriesshire.

He died on 19 May 1824. He is buried in St Cuthbert's Churchyard off Princes Street in central Edinburgh. The grave lies in the extreme south-east corner of the raised section to the south-west of the church.

== Family ==
He was married to Anne Fordyce (1738-1820) daughter of Robert Fordyce of Aberdeen. They had sixteen children of whom seven survived into adulthood.

His elder brother John Steuart (1712-1785) inherited the Dalguise estate.

His daughter Janet Harriet Steuart (1786-1863) married Robert Anderson of Eskbank.
