= Museum on the Mound =

Numismatics museum in Edinburgh, Scotland

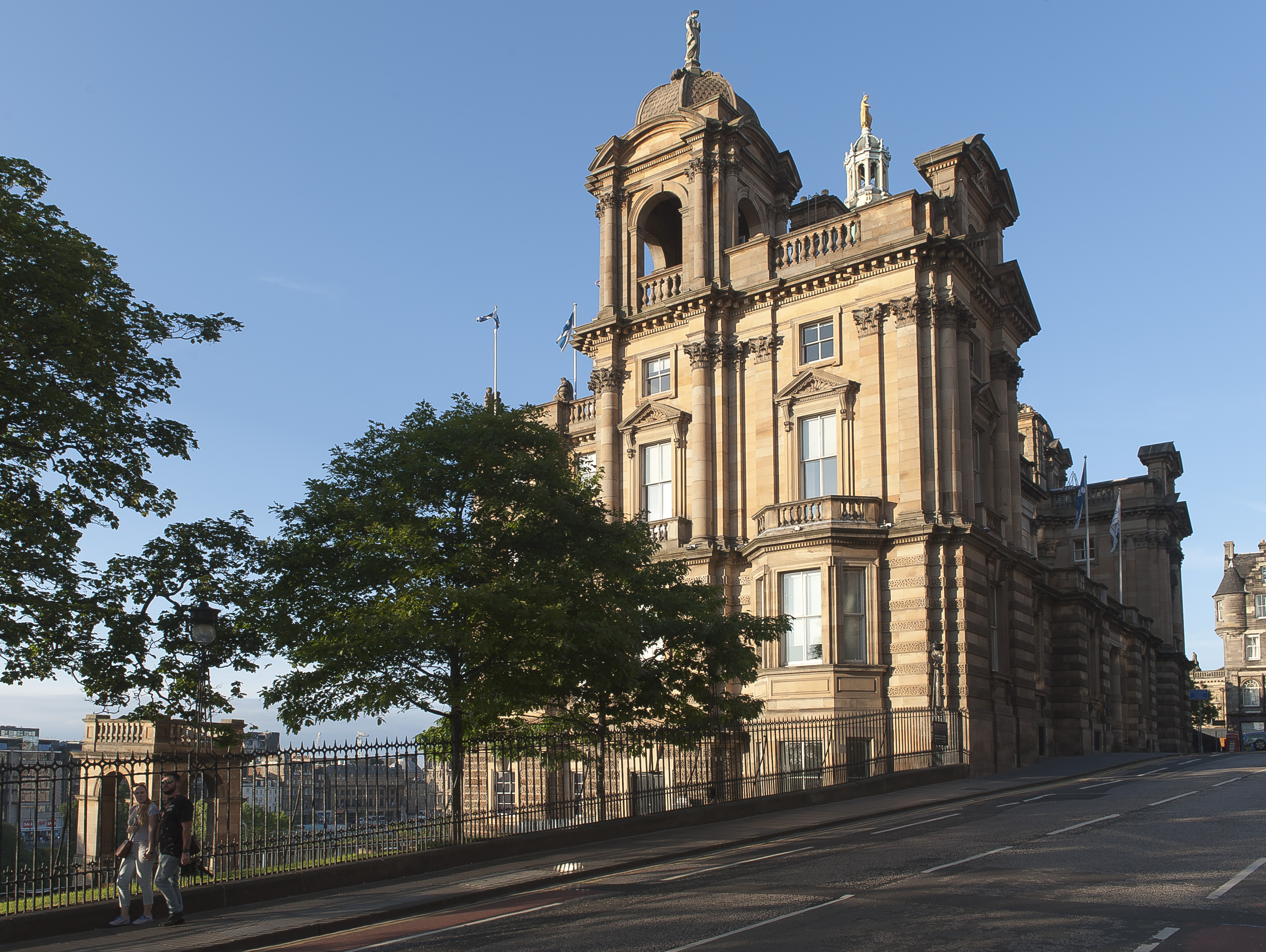
- The museum is located in the Bank of Scotland head office, Edinburgh

- Location of the museum in Edinburgh
- Location: The Mound, Edinburgh
- Coordinates: 55°57′01″N 3°11′36″W
- Type: Numismatics museum
- Collections: Banknotes of Scotland, Scottish coinage, economics
- Visitors: 50,000
- Owner: Bank of Scotland
- Public transit access: Princes Street; Edinburgh Waverley
- Website: museumonthemound.com

Listed Building – Category A
- Official name: 11 Bank Street, Bank Of Scotland With Retaining Wall, Gatepiers, Gates, Railings And Lamp Standards
- Designated: 14 December 1970
- Reference no.: LB28263

The Museum on the Mound (styled MUS£UM ON THE MOUND) is a museum in Edinburgh, Scotland, that focuses on money, coinage and economics. It is located in the Bank of Scotland Head Office building (latterly part of HBOS and now part of Lloyds Banking Group) on The Mound. It has more than 50,000 visitors per year.

== History ==
The Bank of Scotland Head Office building is a large Baroque Revival building topped with a dome which sits at the top of The Mound. The original building was designed in the Palladian style by Richard Crichton and Robert Reid and erected 1801–6, later altered by David Bryce in 1863 and by Peddie and Kinnear in 1878. Because of its location on a steep slope, it has an extensive basement area, part of which now houses the Museum on the Mound.

Prior to 2006, a small museum display existed in a single basement room, but entry was by appointment only. This museum was originally opened in 1986 by the author Ian Rankin. The Museum on the Mound opened in September 2006.

In 2017, Lloyds Banking Group announced that the Museum on the Mound would close at the end of that year. Following a public outcry, the decision was reversed and the museum will now remain open.

== Exhibits ==
The permanent collection includes artefacts tracing the history of the Bank of Scotland since its foundation in 1695, paintings and architectural models of the Head Office building on the Mound, and the history of banking and building societies in Britain. There are also exhibits related to the history of numismatics, including artefacts historically used for barter, ancient tokens dating back as early as the early 12th century, Scottish coinage and paper money. Because the Bank of Scotland has a history of issuing its own banknotes—a right it has retained to this day—the collection includes a number of historic Scottish banknotes. There is also a Bank of England £1 million note displayed as an example of the high-denomination notes used to back banknotes issued by Scottish banks.

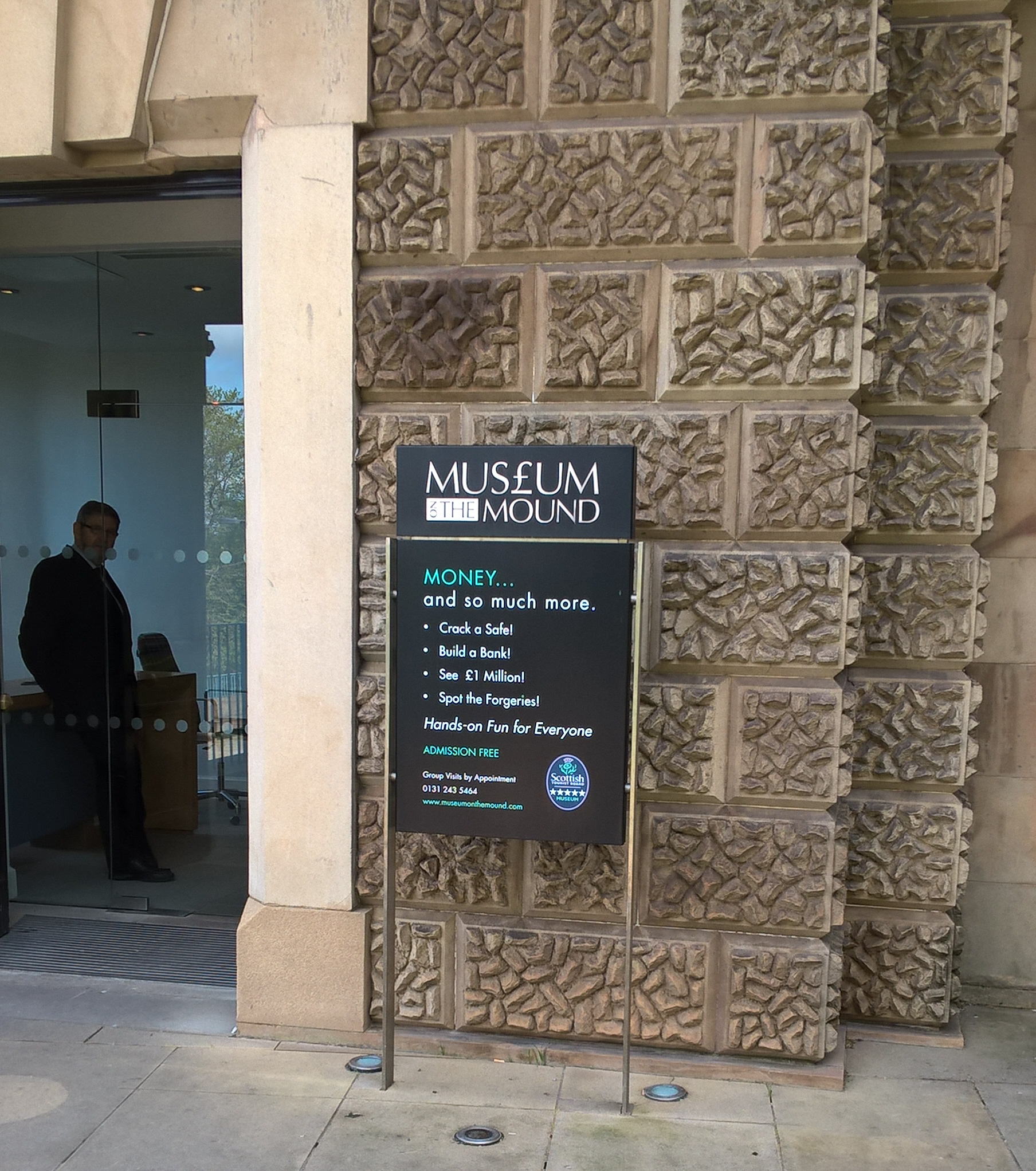
Entrance

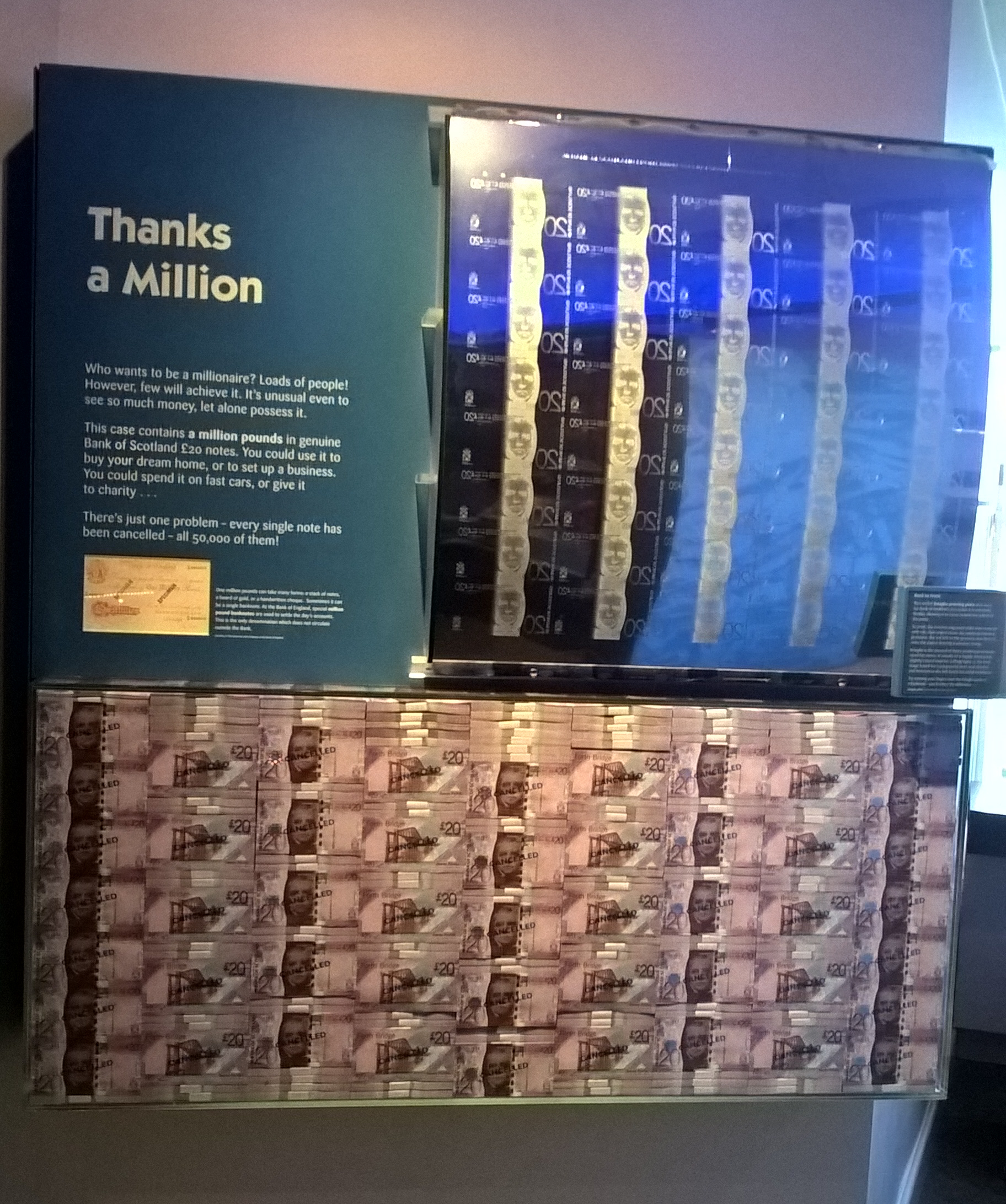
A million pounds

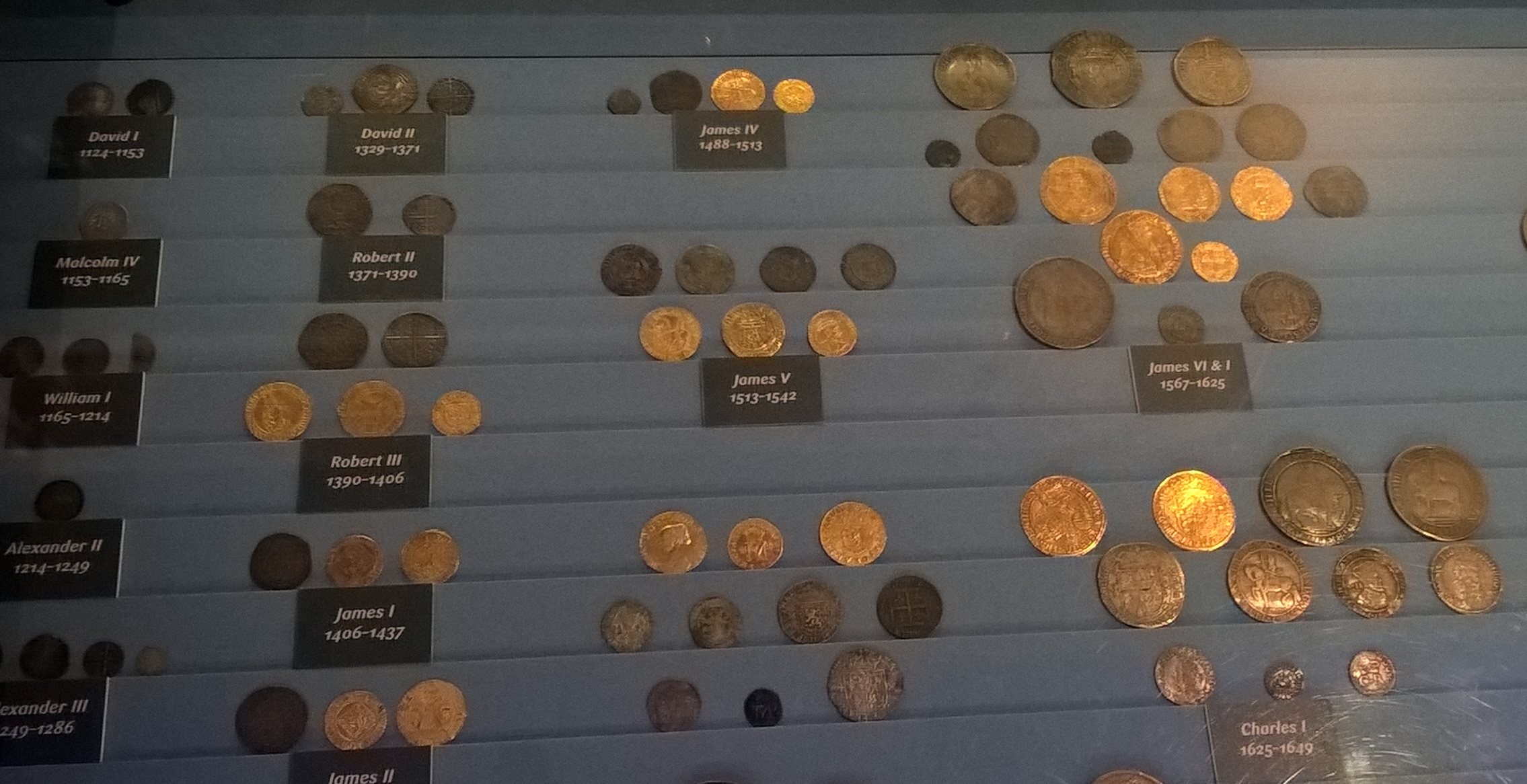
Scottish coins

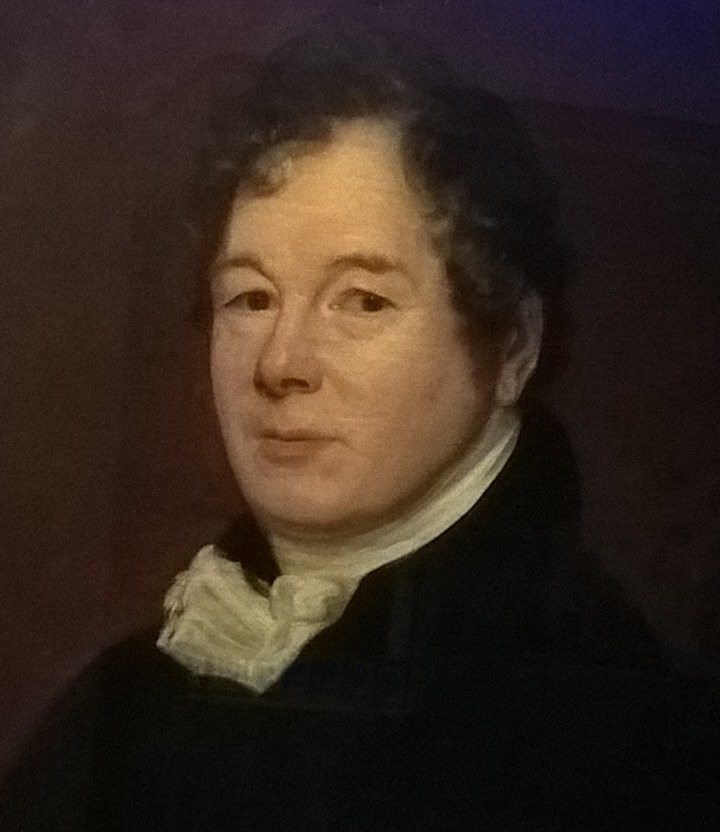
George Pinckard founder and first chairman of Clerical Medical

== See also ==
- List of museums in Scotland
