= John Grieve (Lord Provost) =

Scottish merchant and politician

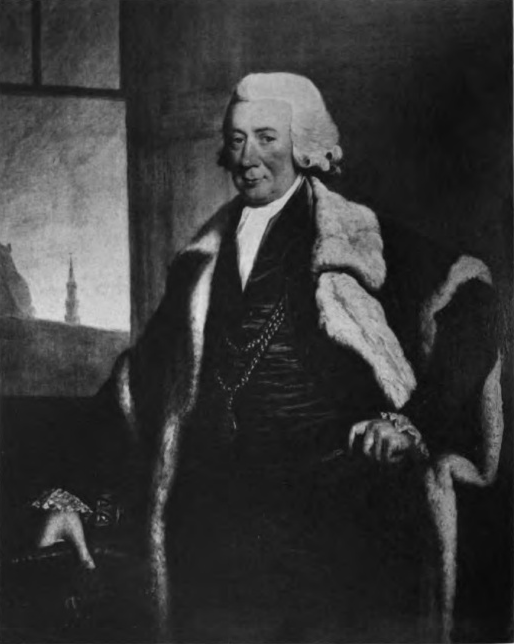
John Grieve, Lord Provost of Edinburgh

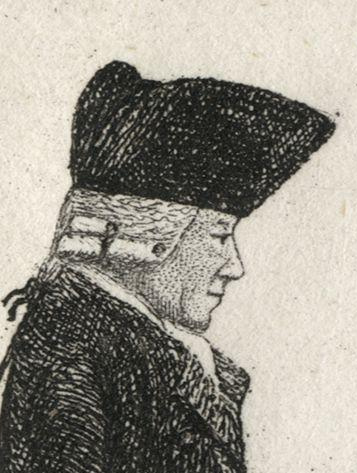
John Grieve, Lord Provost of Edinburgh, cartoon by John Kay 1783

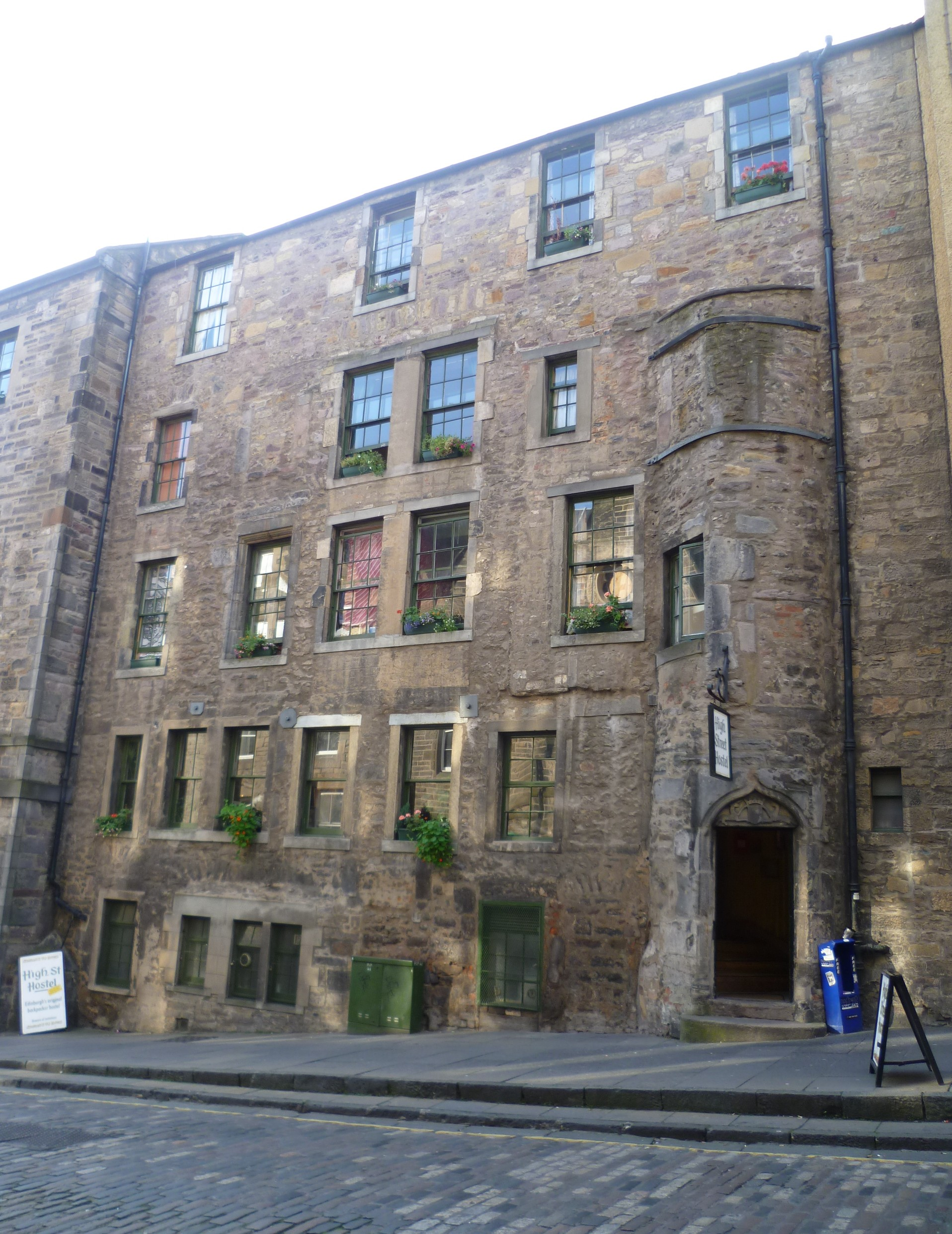
Regent Morton's House on Blackfriars Street - home to John Grieve

Right Hon John Grieve FRSE FSA (d.1803) was a Scottish merchant and politician who served as Lord Provost of Edinburgh 1782 to 1784. He was highly influential in the “Mound Project” linking Edinburgh's Old and New Towns. He was also a co-founder of the Royal Society of Edinburgh in 1783.

== Life ==
He is thought to have been born around 1740. He entered local politics as a Town Councillor in 1765. He served as the City Treasurer 1769 to 1771, a Bailie 1771 to 1779. In 1773 in Peter Williamson's first Edinburgh Post Office directory he is listed as living at the head of Roxburgh Close on the Royal Mile.

He served as Dean of Guild from 1779 to 1782. In 1782 he succeeded David Steuart as Lord Provost, the highest position available in local politics in Scotland. Whilst some records show this as ending in 1784, he curiously writes an open letter in 1788 to all magistrates of Scottish Towns signing it as "Lord Provost of Edinburgh". Grant states he served a second term as provost 1786/7 and also cites him (in 1783) as one of the main promoters of the concept of the Mound to better connect the Old and New Towns of Edinburgh.

He served as president of the Royal Physical Society of Edinburgh 1767–77.

In 1784 he attended the General Assembly of the Church of Scotland, representing Edinburgh. He was then living at Strachans Close on the Royal Mile.

He lived at traded (with his brother Alexander) at the head of Fleshmarket Close on the Royal Mile. He resided 200m to the east in a house accessed from Strichen's Close but contained within the fabric of Regent Morton's House on Blackfriars Wynd.

Around 1800 he moved to a new house at 38 Princes Street where he is listed as a Commissioner of Excise.

He died on 19 April 1803. He is buried in Greyfriars Kirkyard.

== Artistic recognition ==
Grieve was drawn by the caricaturist John Kay, flanked by city guards George Gordon and George Robertson, in 1787.
