= The Mound =

Street in Edinburgh, Scotland

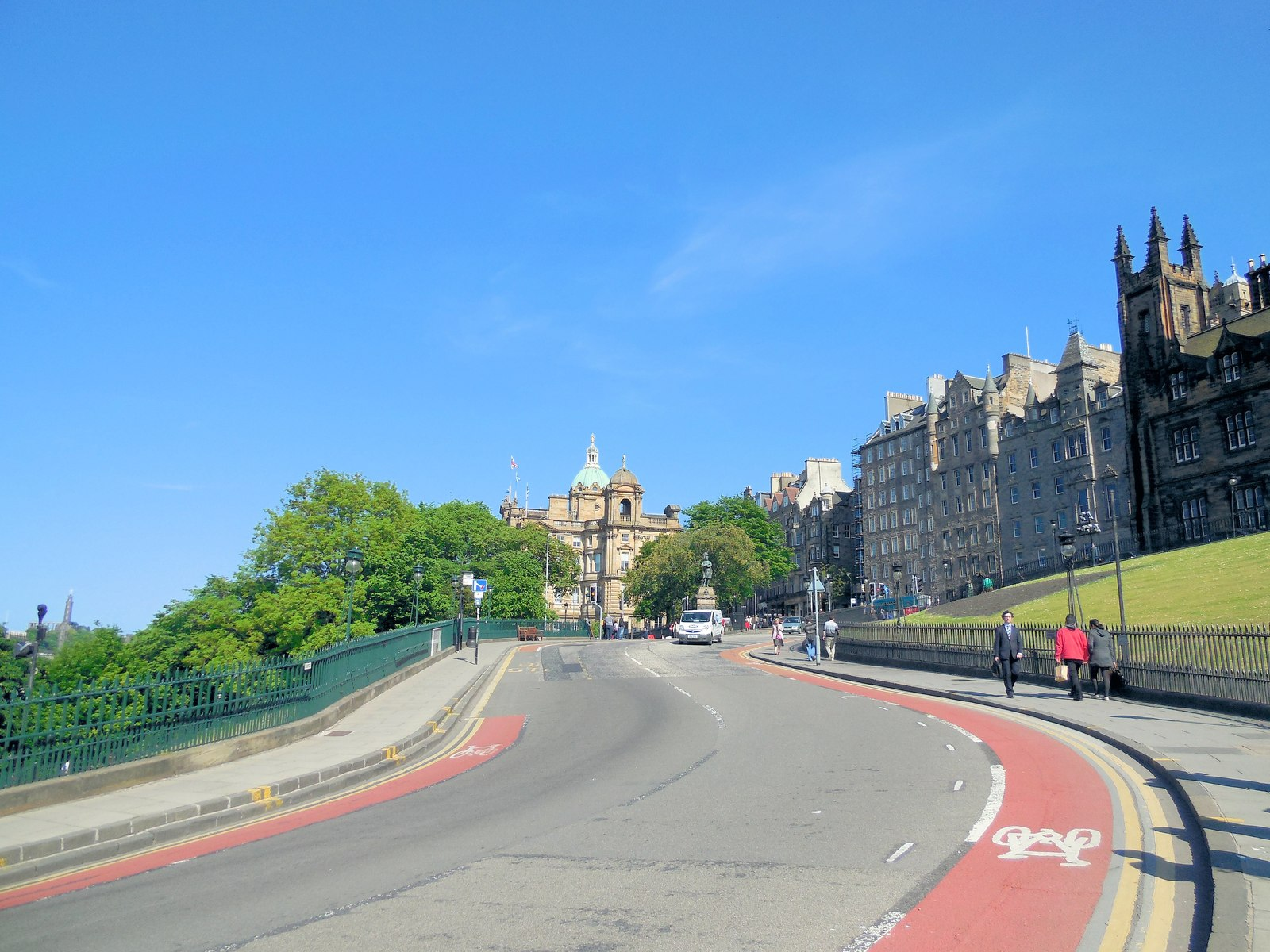
- View up the Mound towards the Bank of Scotland

- Location within Edinburgh city centre
- Native name: Am Meall (Scottish Gaelic)
- Former name: The Earthen Mound
- Length: 380 m (1,250 ft) (including The Mound and North Bank Street)
- Postal code: EH1
- Coordinates: 55°57′0.28″N 3°11′44.13″W
- North (bottom) end: Princes Street
- South (top) end: Bank Street/Royal Mile

Construction
- Completion: 1827

The Mound (Scottish Gaelic: Am Meall) is an artificial slope and road in central Edinburgh, Scotland, which connects Edinburgh's New and Old Towns. It was formed by dumping around 1,501,000 cartloads of earth excavated from the foundations of the New Town into Nor Loch, which was drained in 1765 and forms today's Princes Street Gardens.

== History ==
The construction of the Earthen Mound, as it was originally called, was first proposed in 1783 by the Lord Provost of Edinburgh, John Grieve to support merchants on the Royal Mile to improve connection to the residents on Princes Street (which was then built only from St Andrew Square to Hanover Street and was wholly residential) in correct anticipation of the need for such a new route. Its completion was not formally agreed until the 1827 Improvement act. It was improved over the years until by 1830 it was macadamised and landscaped so that it appeared more or less complete. A need for a railway tunnel was pre-empted in 1844 with the current southern tunnel completed in 1846 to a design by William Henry Playfair (prior to the construction of the gallery above). A second northern tunnel was added in 1892 beneath the then extant galleries above.

== Description ==
The Mound is a busy, if fairly steep, thoroughfare taking traffic to and from Princes Street in the New Town to the Royal Mile in the Old Town. The top end of the Mound is named Bank Street North, adjoining Bank Street. The lower end, or 'Foot' of the Mound is a few metres' walk from the Princes Street tram stop. Due to its raised elevation, the Mound commands expansive views over Princes Street and the New Town of Edinburgh and towards Calton Hill. An 'electric blanket' was installed under the surface of the roadway of the mound to keep this clear of ice and snow in 1959. It is no longer operational but was one of the first of its type.

== Notable buildings ==
Some of Edinburgh's most notable buildings and institutions have their premises on the Mound, including the National Gallery of Scotland, the Royal Scottish Academy, the spires of the University of Edinburgh's New College, the General Assembly Hall of the Church of Scotland, the elegant domed Headquarters of the commercially owned Bank of Scotland, and its museum, Museum on the Mound.

Noted buildings on The Mound

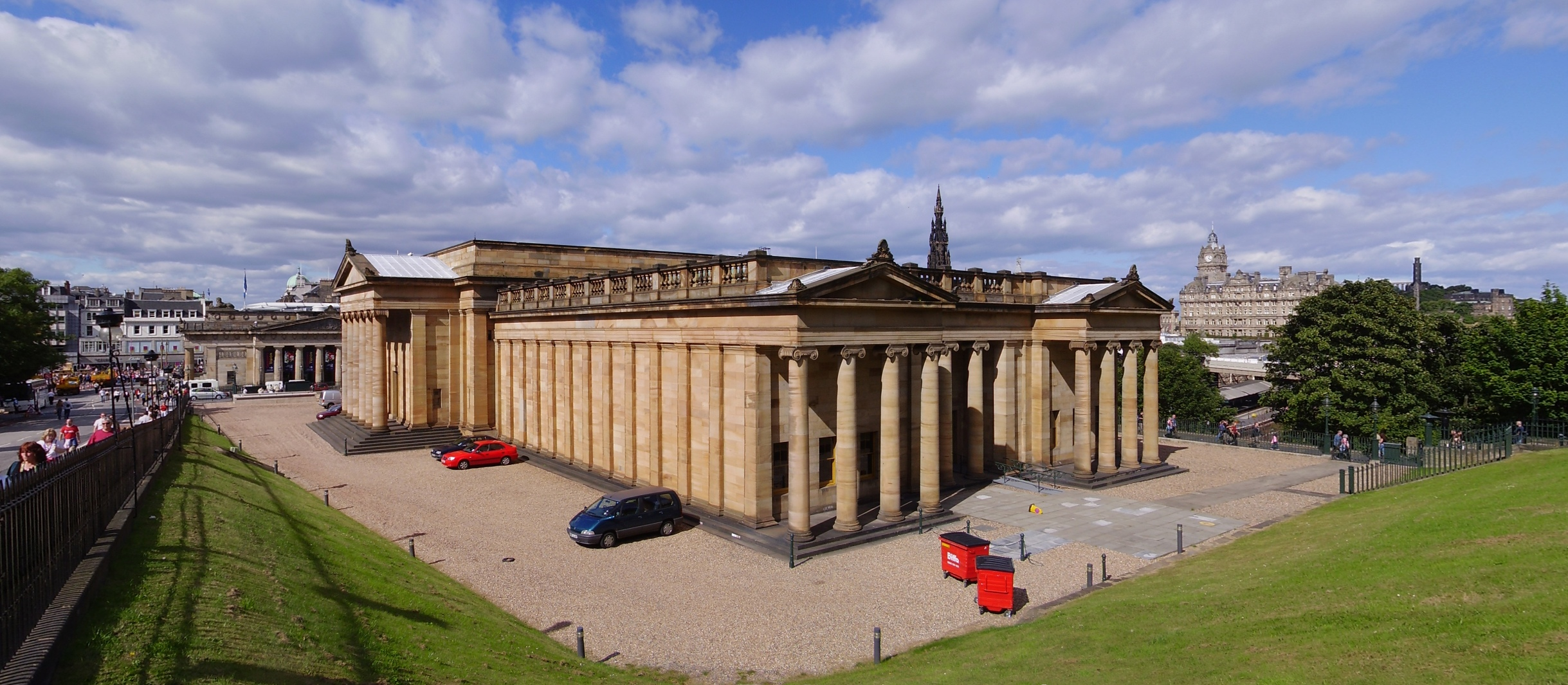
The Scottish National Gallery

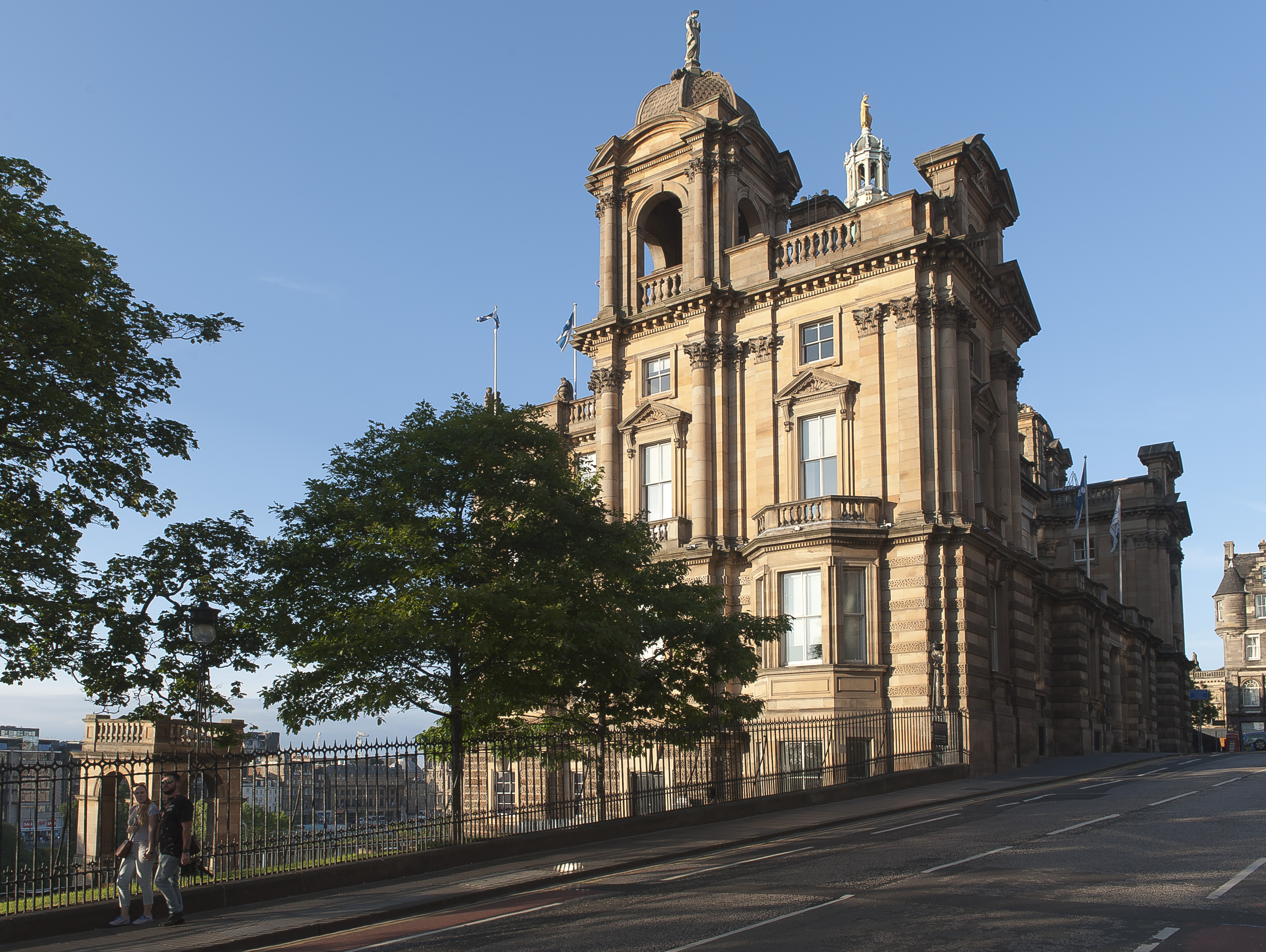
The Bank of Scotland headquarters on The Mound

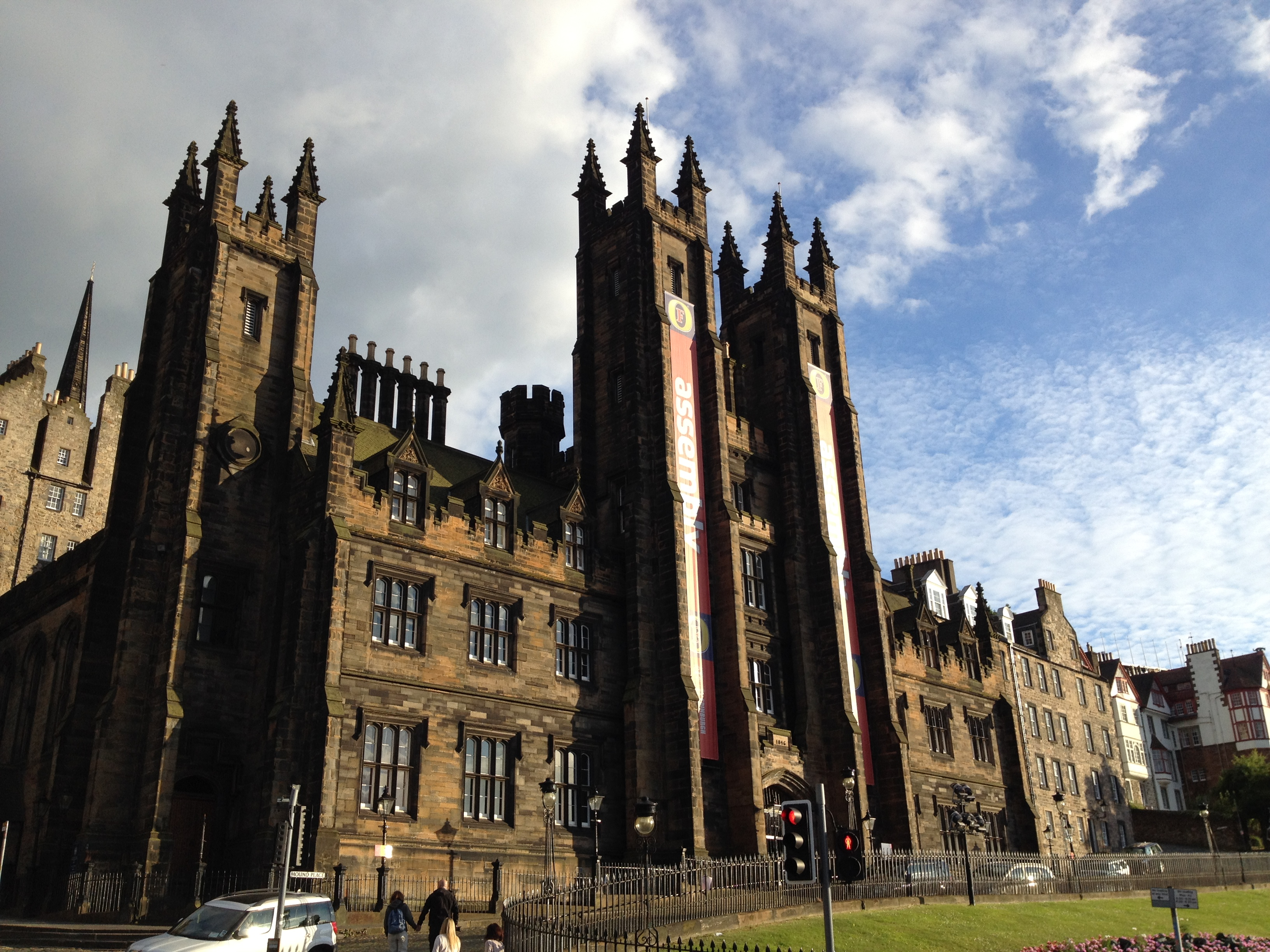
New College and the General Assembly

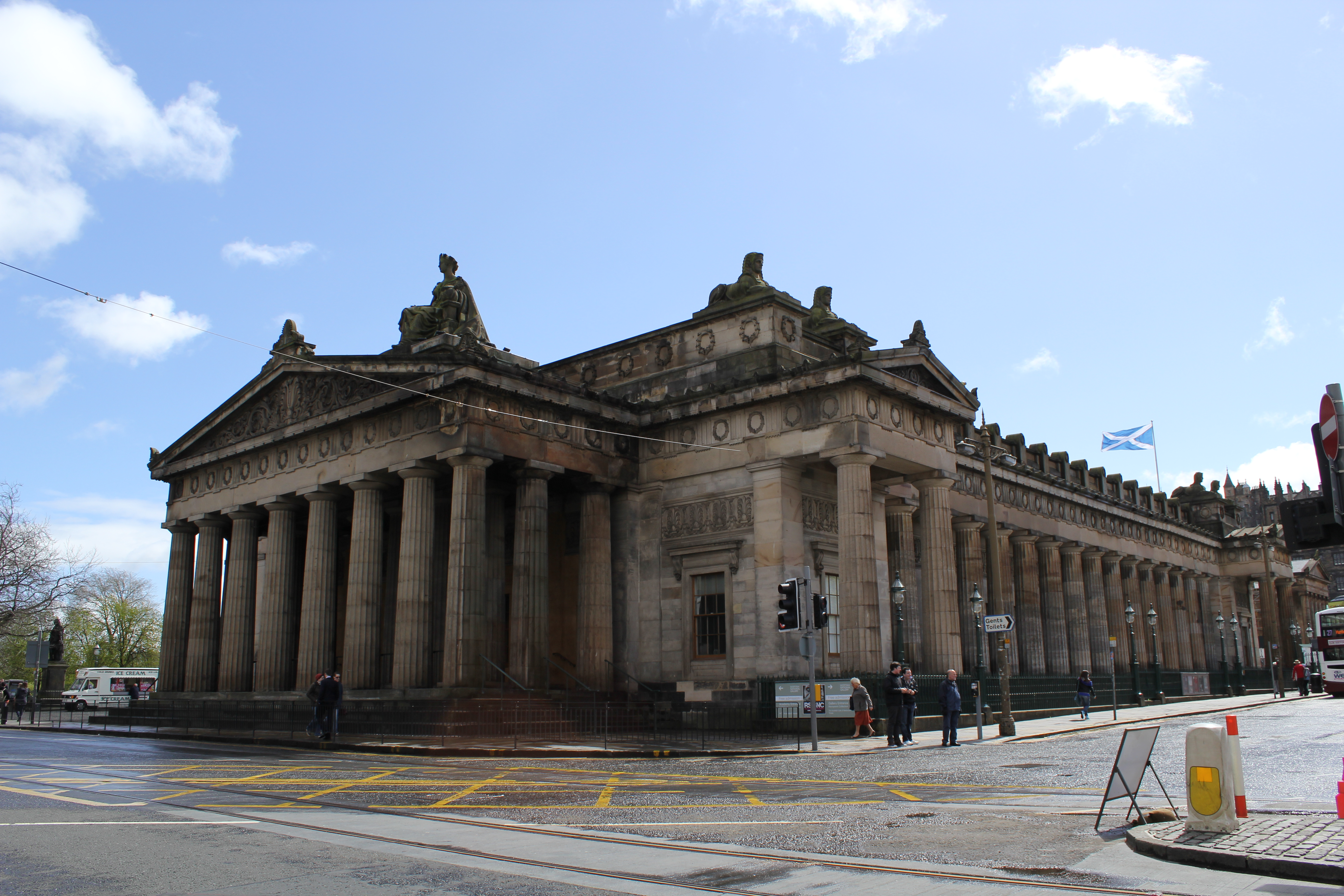
Royal Scottish Academy

== See also ==
- Sermon on the Mound
