= Princes Street (disambiguation) =

Princes Street is in Edinburgh, Scotland.

Princes Street may also refer to:

- Princes Street, Dunedin, New Zealand
- Princes Street, Marylebone, London, England
- Princes Street, Soho, London, England
- Princes Street Primary School, Tasmania, Australia
- Princes Street (painting), by Alexander Nasmyth, 1825

== See also ==
- Edinburgh Princes Street railway station
- Perth Princes Street railway station
- Prince Street, Boston, Massachusetts, U.S.
- Prince Street (Manhattan), New York City, U.S.
- Princess Street (disambiguation)
