= Carrubbers City Church =

Church in Edinburgh, Scotland

Coordinates: 55°57′2″N 3°11′8″W

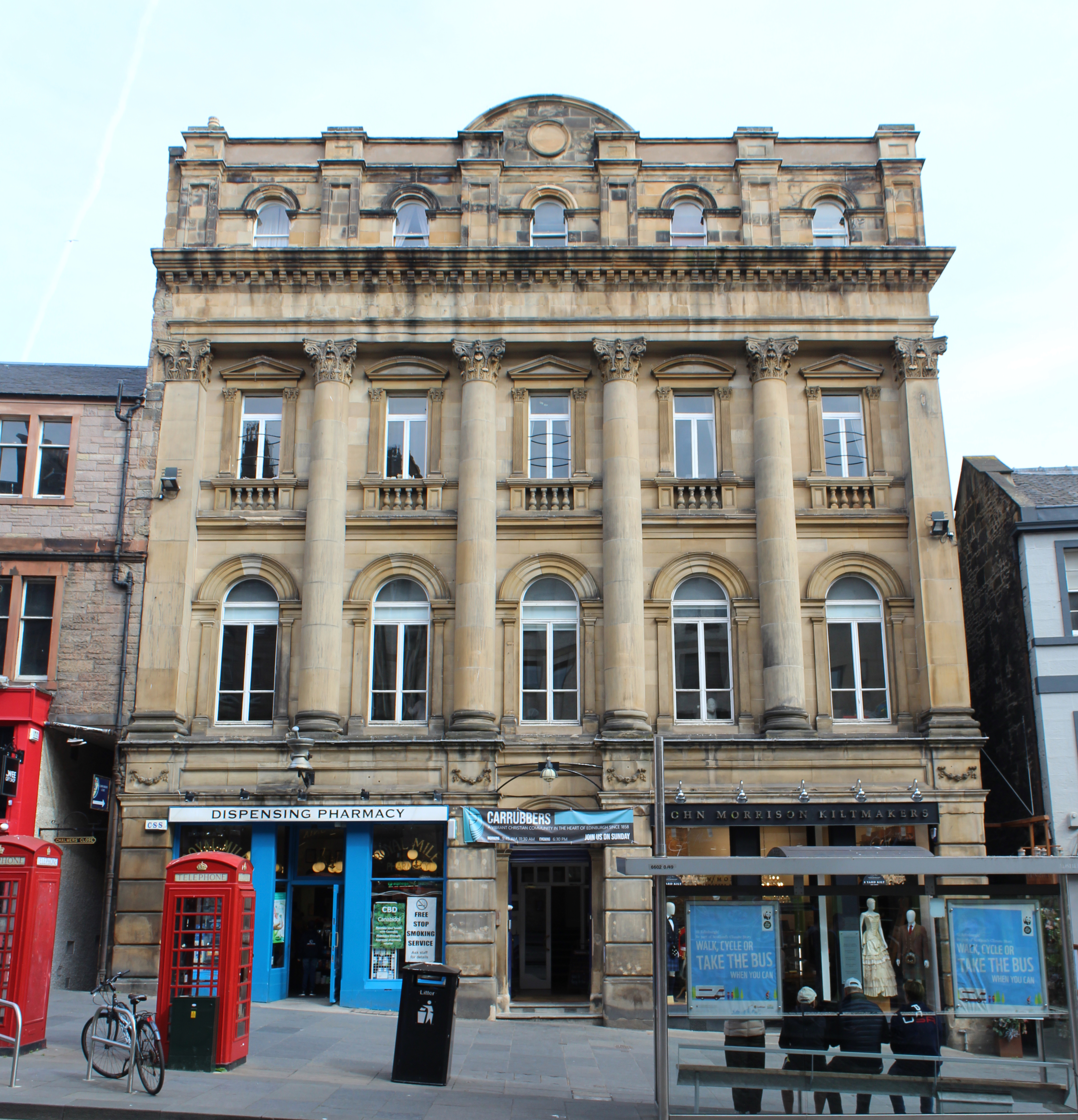
Carrubbers Christian Centre

Carrubbers City Church (previously known as Carrubbers Christian Centre) is a church on the Royal Mile in Edinburgh, Scotland.

== Founding ==
Carrubbers Close Mission was founded in 1858 and its 'workers' originally met in a former Atheist Meeting House in Carrubbers Close. The Rev. James Gall (1808–1895) was the founder of the Mission. In 1883 the American evangelist Dwight L. Moody came to Edinburgh. He was accompanied by Ira D. Sankey who sang his self-composed songs while Moody preached. During their visit, they managed to raise £10,000 to pay for a permanent home for the mission and later that year, the foundation stone was laid. The building was designed by the Edinburgh architect, John Armstrong.

As a mission rather than a church, Carrubbers supported other Edinburgh churches in teaching and outreach. Run by a board of directors representing other churches of various denominations throughout the city, Carrubbers has concentrated through most of its history on evangelism, Bible teaching and alleviating suffering amongst the poor, the ill and those prone to addiction. Saturday night rallies had been a feature of the Carrubbers ministry and offered a Free Breakfast for the homeless on Sunday mornings.

== Carrubbers transformed ==
In the 1980s, with large scale rallies becoming culturally less popular, and with an ageing building, the directors decided to refurbish the fabric of the building. The project was named, "Carrubbers into the nineties." In 1990, work began and a floor was inserted at balcony level. This created an inviting main hall capable of seating 350 people. In the new basement, a café was built along with lower halls and office space. Upstairs from the main hall are further halls and office space along with a library and a private flat.

The focus moved to building a small congregation as an independent, non-denominational church. Carrubbers main meetings were then on Sundays at 10.30am and 7:00pm with a range of over 30 different activities and ministries including home groups on the second and fourth Tuesdays of each month, with church prayer meetings on other Tuesdays.

== Project 140 ==
In 2026, the building was renovated to better serve the needs over the next 140 years. The main aims were to provide better disabled access, installing a lift to serve most of the floors, and improve the facilities to better match the work that was now being done. During the refurbishment the congregation met at the Faith Mission in Gilmerton and in the German Speaking Church in Marchmont. It was also rebranded from Carrubbers Christian Centre to Carrubbers City Church to better describe the activities of the organization.

Carrubbers City Church attracts many students and young people and is known for its expository Bible preaching and a range of courses to train and equip Christians. In addition, many find faith in Jesus through contact with its members or through its courses for enquirers or outreach enterprises.

Carrubbers is a registered charity doing work both to advance their evangelistic endeavours and support the local community.
