= Princess Street =

Princess Street may refer to:

- Princess Street (Mumbai), a street in Bombay, India
- Princess Street (Kingston, Ontario), the main street of Kingston, Ontario, Canada
- Princess Street, Manchester, a street in Manchester, United Kingdom

== See also ==
- Princes Street (disambiguation)
- Gofukucho-dori, Nagoya, Japan
