= John Armstrong (architect) =

Scottish architect and civil engineer

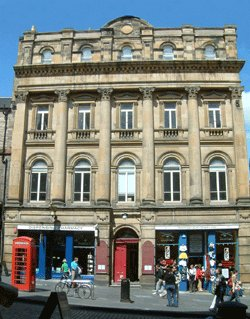
Carrubbers Close Mission, now Carrubbers Christian Centre by John Armstrong

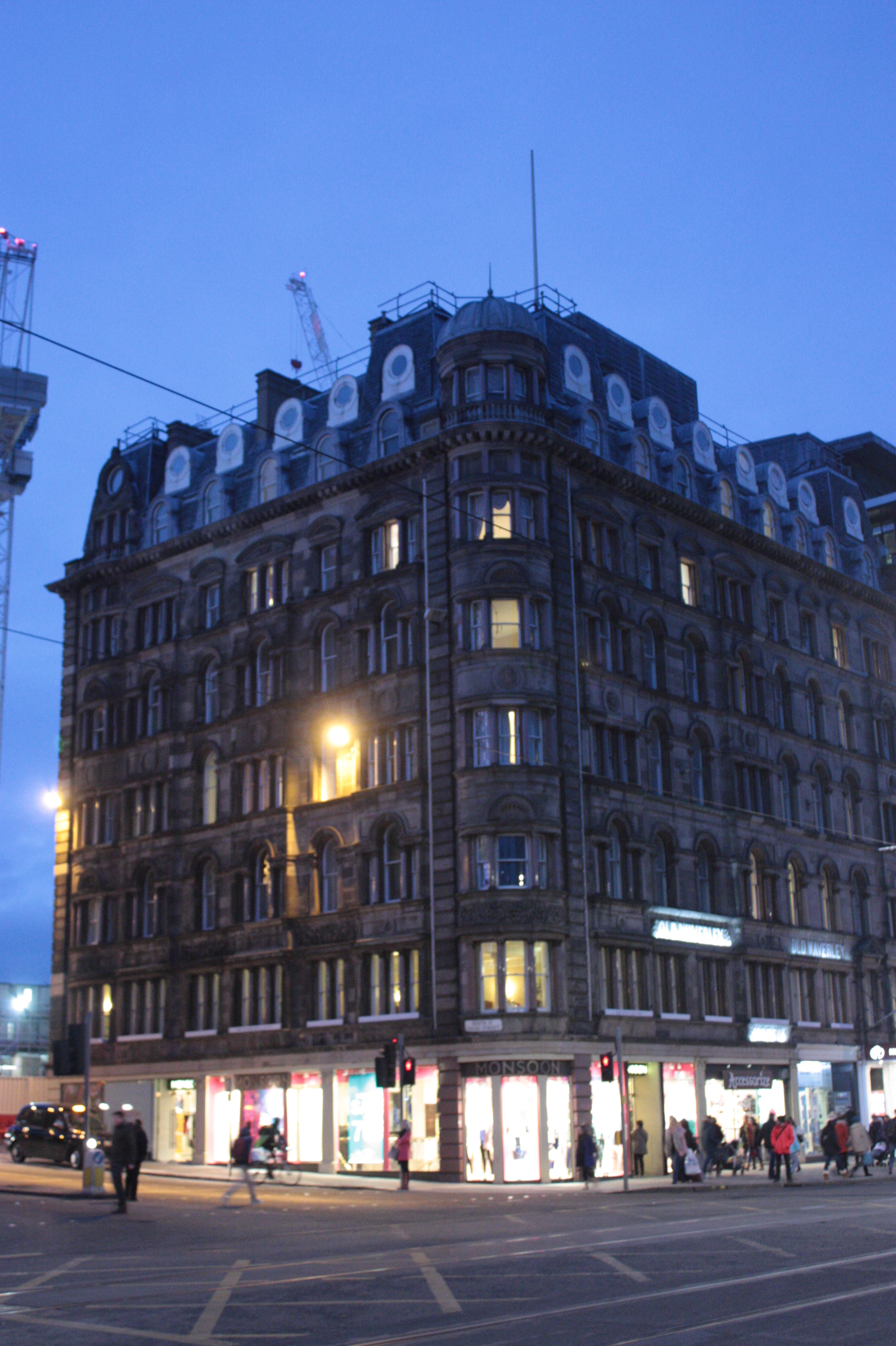
The Old Waverley Hotel, Princes Street, Edinburgh at twilight

John Armstrong (20 January 1857 – 27 April 1941) was a Scottish architect and civil engineer operating in Scotland in the late 19th century. He was a Quaker, and appears to have done much work for the Society of Friends.

== Life ==
He was born in Newport Street in Edinburgh in 1857, the son of James Armstrong, an engine driver and superintendent with the Caledonian Railway, and Agnes Irvine. The family moved to Carlisle when John was only four years old.

In 1881 he appears in the census as an architect operating from 51 Cockburn Street, Edinburgh. His home address is then given as 2 South Clerk Street. In 1882 he took up very prestigious offices at 2 Queen Street in the New Town. In 1885 he moved to the then newly completed corner flat at 17 Hillside Crescent, designed by his peer, John Chesser.

He appears was affiliated with various Quaker groups after being admitted to the faith in 1888 and was linked to the Westminster and Longford Quaker Meeting House, Russell Street in London .

After briefly living with his brother George in Birmingham in England for part of 1886 he moved to London. He is noted as applying for membership of the Quaker Meeting House in Middlesex in April 1888. Here he met Marie Marthe Bobenrieth (1863–1955) from Lyon in France who married him shortly thereafter. John Armstrong was a member of the Peace Committee and also a founding member of the League of Universal Brotherhood and Native Races in London.

John Armstrong became a civil engineer and inventor, experimenting with ore and he had a number of patents for reverberating furnaces and fire grates. He wrote a book, published in 1929 – Carbonization Technology and Engineering publisher C. Griffin. After living in Acton, England he moved to Eden Hall, Montpelier Road, Ealing, England. The couple retired to Hyères, France (a popular British hub) in France in 1933 where they lived in the Villa l’Ensoleillado (which he had purchased in 1926). They returned to London in 1939 to renew their wedding vows at the Quaker Meeting House in London and celebrate their 39th wedding anniversary. He died in Hyeres in 1941, and was cremated and placed in the Columbarium in Marseille.

== Works ==
- Old Waverley Hotel, Princes Street, Edinburgh (1883)
- Carrubbers Close Mission, Royal Mile, Edinburgh (1883)
- Eden Hall, Montpelier Road, Ealing
