= Royal Scottish Academy Building =

Art museum in Edinburgh, Scotland

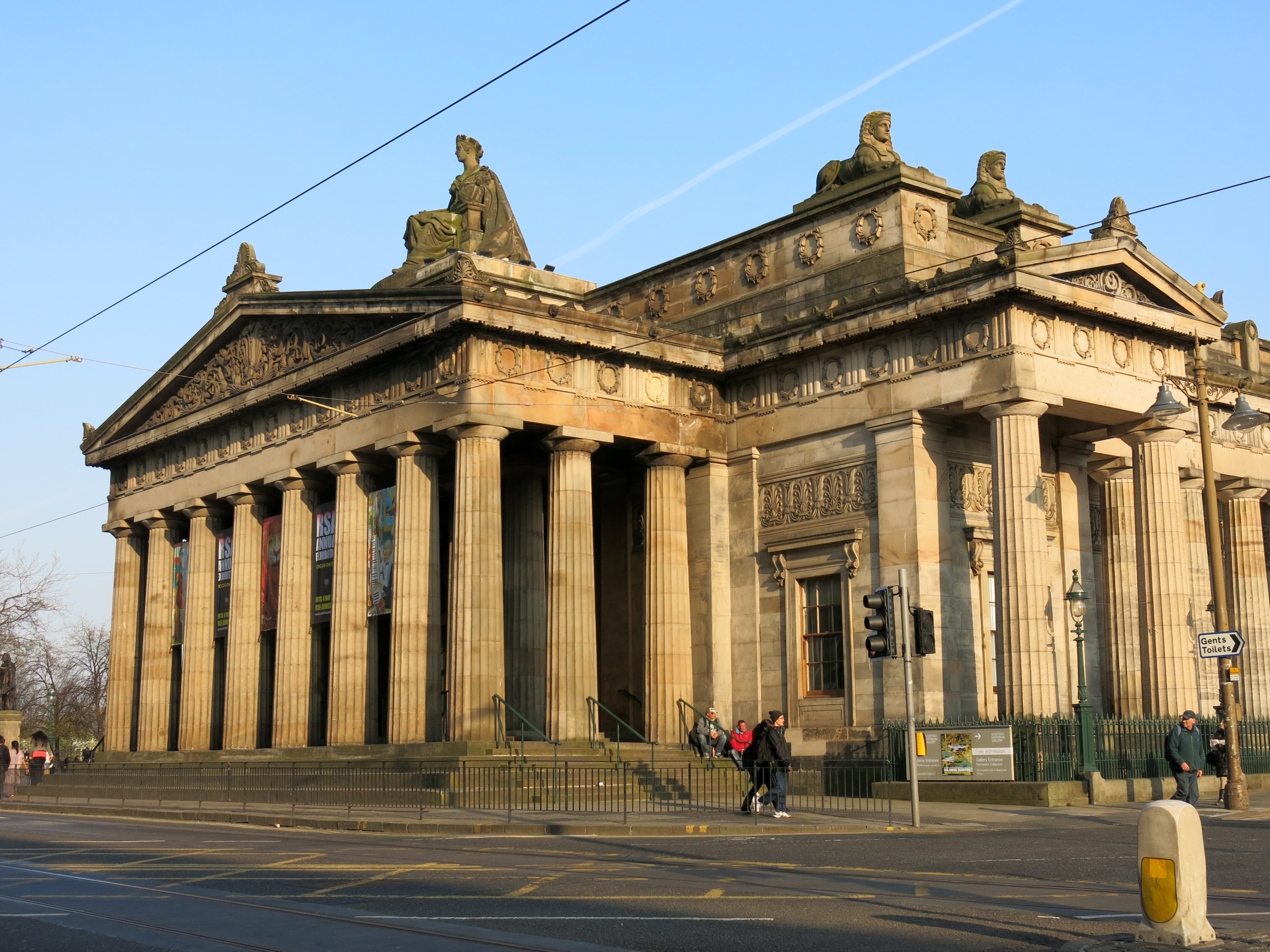
- The Royal Scottish Academy Building seen from Princes Street

- Location within Edinburgh city centre
- Established: 1822; 204 years ago
- Location: The Mound; Edinburgh; Scotland
- Coordinates: 55°57′06″N 3°11′47″W
- Public transit access: Princes Street; Edinburgh Waverley
- Website: www.royalscottishacademy.org

The Royal Scottish Academy building, the home of the Royal Scottish Academy, is an art museum in Edinburgh, Scotland. It is situated at the junction of The Mound and Princes Street in the centre of the city. It was built by William Henry Playfair in 1822–6. Along with the adjacent National Gallery of Scotland, their neo-classical design helped to transform Edinburgh into the cityscape known as "the Athens of the North". Today the structure is a Category A listed building.

== History ==
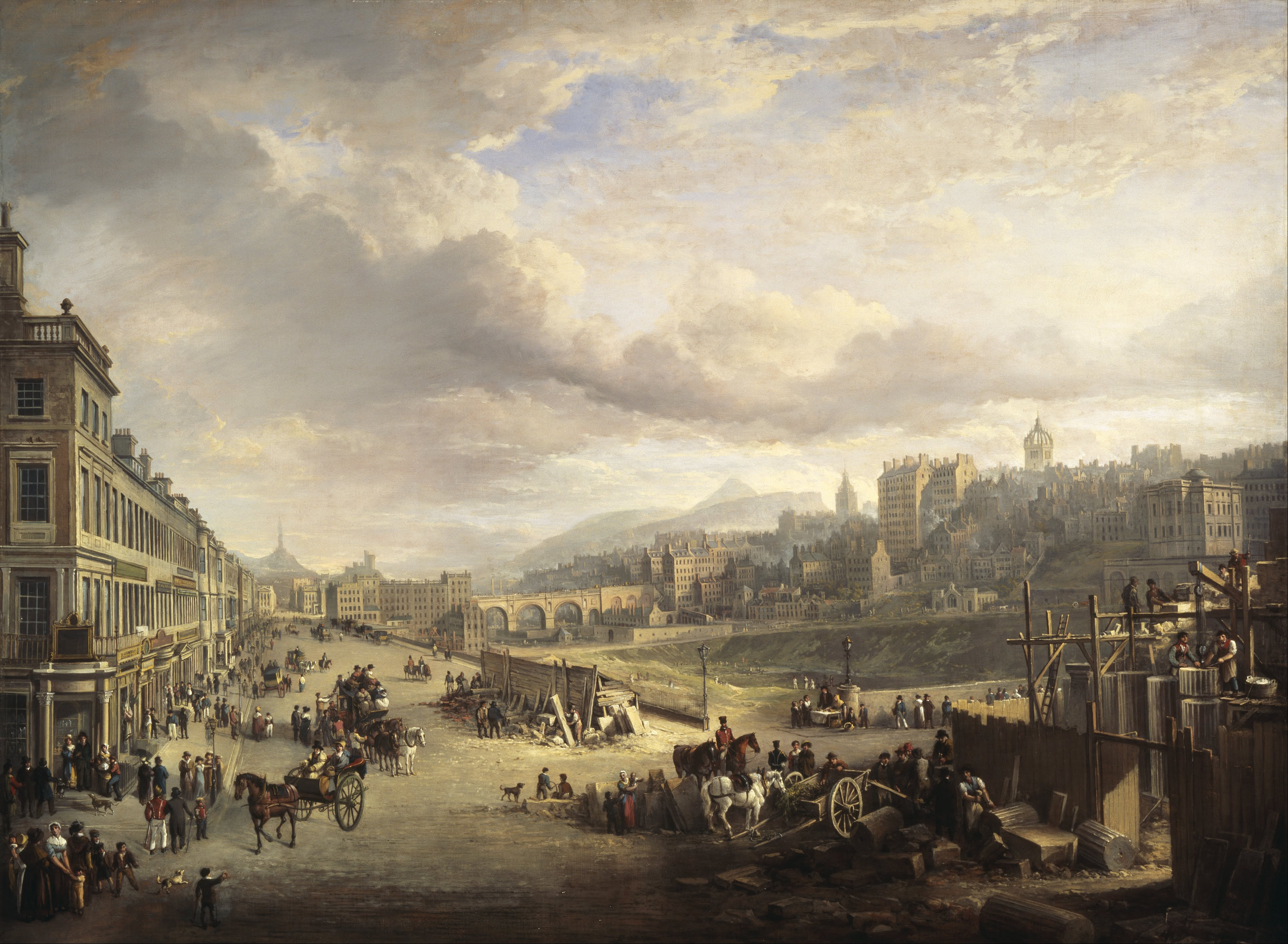
Princes Street, 1825 painting by Alexander Nasmyth of Princes Street, with the construction of the Royal Institution visible, right

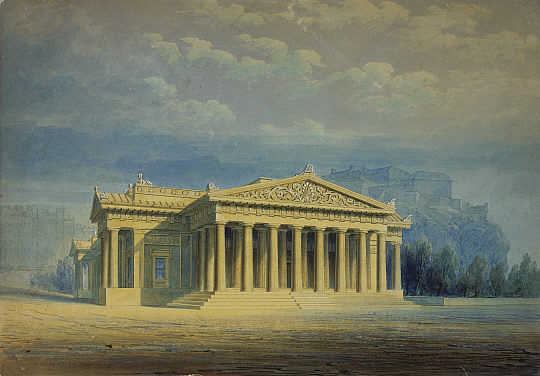
The Royal Institution, Edinburgh (now the Royal Scottish Academy), by George Meikle Kemp, c. 1840; watercolour and pen, 31.30 x 44.90 cm; National Galleries Scotland

The building was originally proposed by the Scottish Board of Manufactures and Fisheries in 1821 to provide shared accommodation for three separate cultural organisations: the Royal Society of Edinburgh, the Royal Institution for the Encouragement of the Fine Arts and a museum of the Society of Antiquaries of Scotland. The building was known as the Royal Institution from 1826 to 1911.

The Royal Institution building was designed by the noted Scottish architect William Henry Playfair and built in 1822–6. According to the antiquary James Grant, 2000 piles were driven into the ground to stabilise the foundations on the site above the Nor Loch. The construction works are depicted in an 1825 painting by Alexander Nasmyth, in which Playfair can be seen supervising the erection of the fluted Doric columns.

In 1826, a group of artists broke away from the Royal Institution after disagreements over its policies, taking the name of the Scottish Academy. From 1835, the group leased gallery space in the Royal Institution building to mount exhibitions of its growing art collection, and in 1838 the group received a royal charter and became the Royal Scottish Academy (RSA). One of its key aims was to found a national art gallery for Scotland, and this was realised in 1859, when a new gallery building was built by Playfair, the National Gallery of Scotland, adjacent to the RI building. The building housed RI's collection of Old Master paintings along with the RSA collection.

In 1831–6, the Board of Manufactures and Fisheries extended the Royal Institution.

At the end of the 19th century, the Society of Antiquaries relocated its museum to new premises on Queen Street (the building that now houses the Scottish National Portrait Gallery), while the Royal Society moved to 22-24 George Street, and in 1907, the Royal Institution moved to the new Edinburgh College of Art. In 1911, the RSA, which had been sharing space in the National Gallery building since 1859, was granted permanent tenancy of the old RI building and the right to hold its annual exhibition there. The building became known as the Royal Scottish Academy, a name it retains to this day. The former RI building was remodelled in 1911–12 by William Thomas Oldrieve, with the addition of new galleries on the upper level.

In 1910, the Royal Scottish Academy was transferred back to the former Royal Institution Building and granted permanent tenancy of office space together with the right to hold its annual exhibition there.

== Architecture ==
The RSA building is designed in the neo-classical style, modelled on a Greek Doric temple. The rectangular structure is faced with sandstone ashlar stone from Culallo, Fife, and Craigleith. It is surrounded by a colonnade of fluted Doric columns on a stylobate. A Doric entablature runs above the columns, consisting of a sculpted acanthus frieze with triglyphs. The north and south elevations are fronted by prostyle octastyle porticoes surmounted by large pediments decorated with scrolled foliate carving. The east and west sides feature smaller pedimented projections.

The north portico on the Princes Street side is topped by a large statue of Queen Victoria styled as Britannia, sculpted by Sir John Steell (Playfair's original drawings indicate that a Britannia statue with a reclining lion was originally intended for the building). Each of the four corners of the building is topped by a pair of carved stone sphinxes, also by Steell.

In 2003 railings (lost in World War II) together with a series of traditional lamps, were restored around both the academy and the National Gallery behind, isolating each building from the public space here.

In the 2010s, the RSA building was refurbished as part of the £32 million Playfair Project, and linked to the Scottish National Gallery by a subterranean public area to create a single, integrated arts complex with an additional entrance in Princes Street Gardens.

RSA architectural details

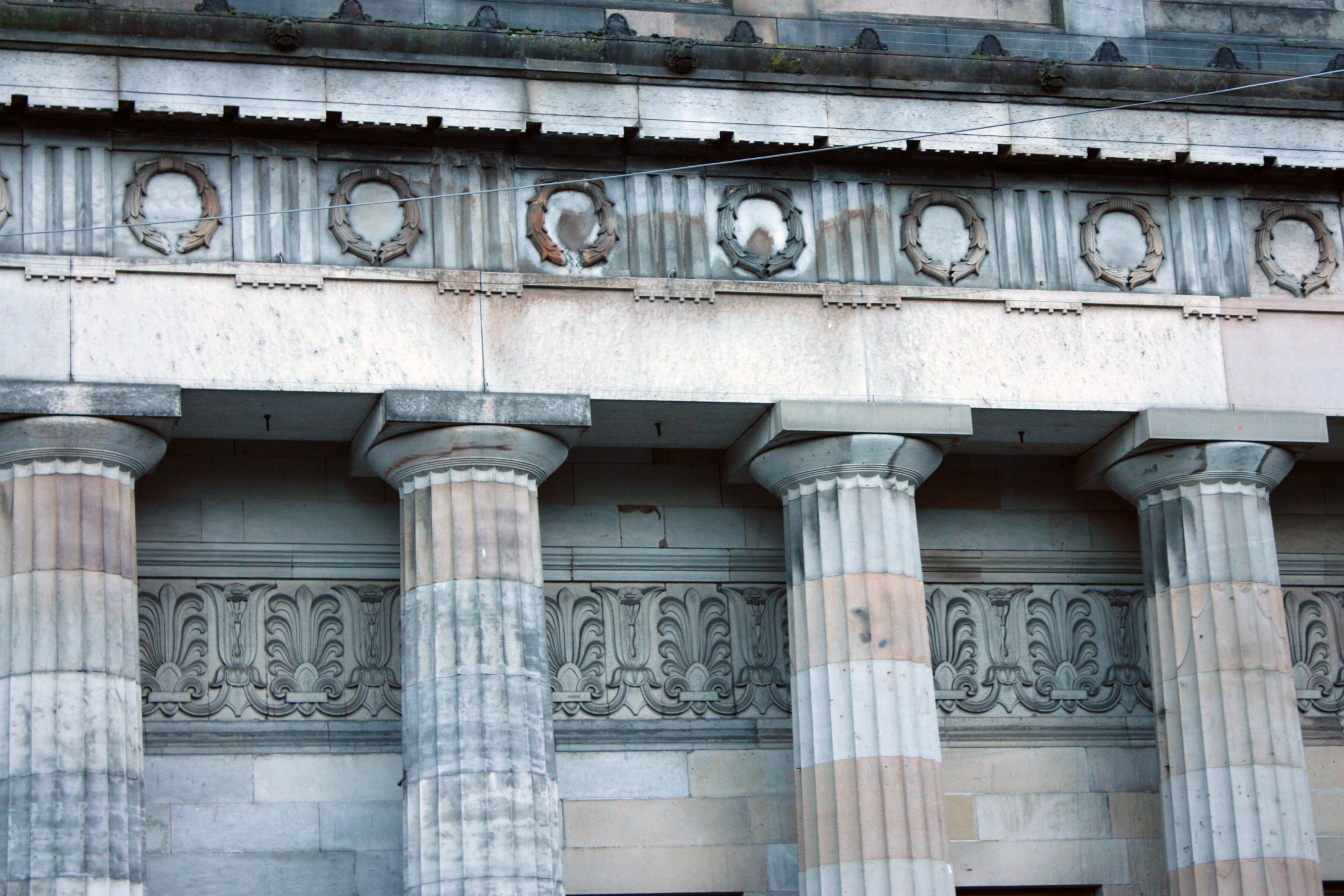
Playfair's fine detailing

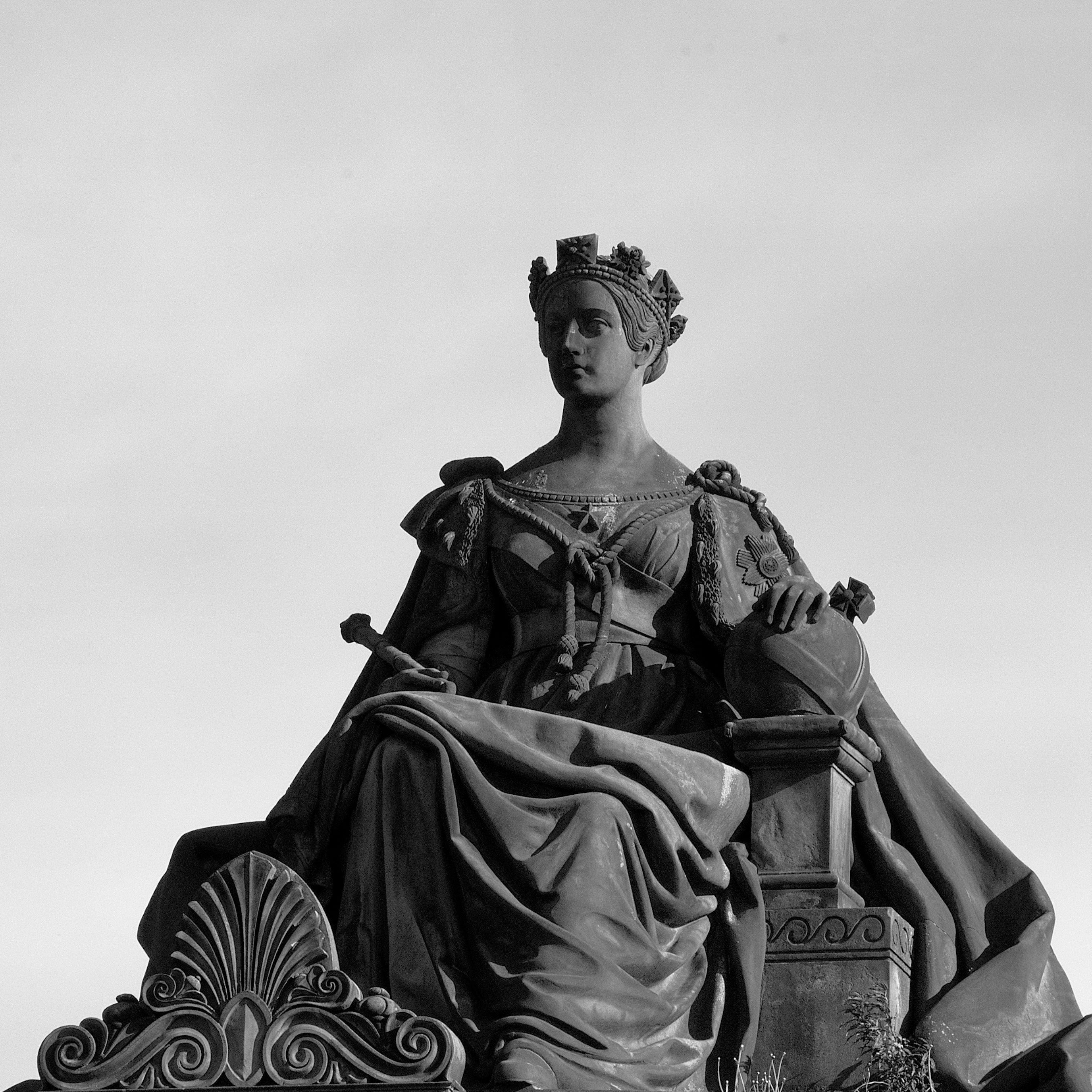
Steell's rooftop statue of Queen Victoria

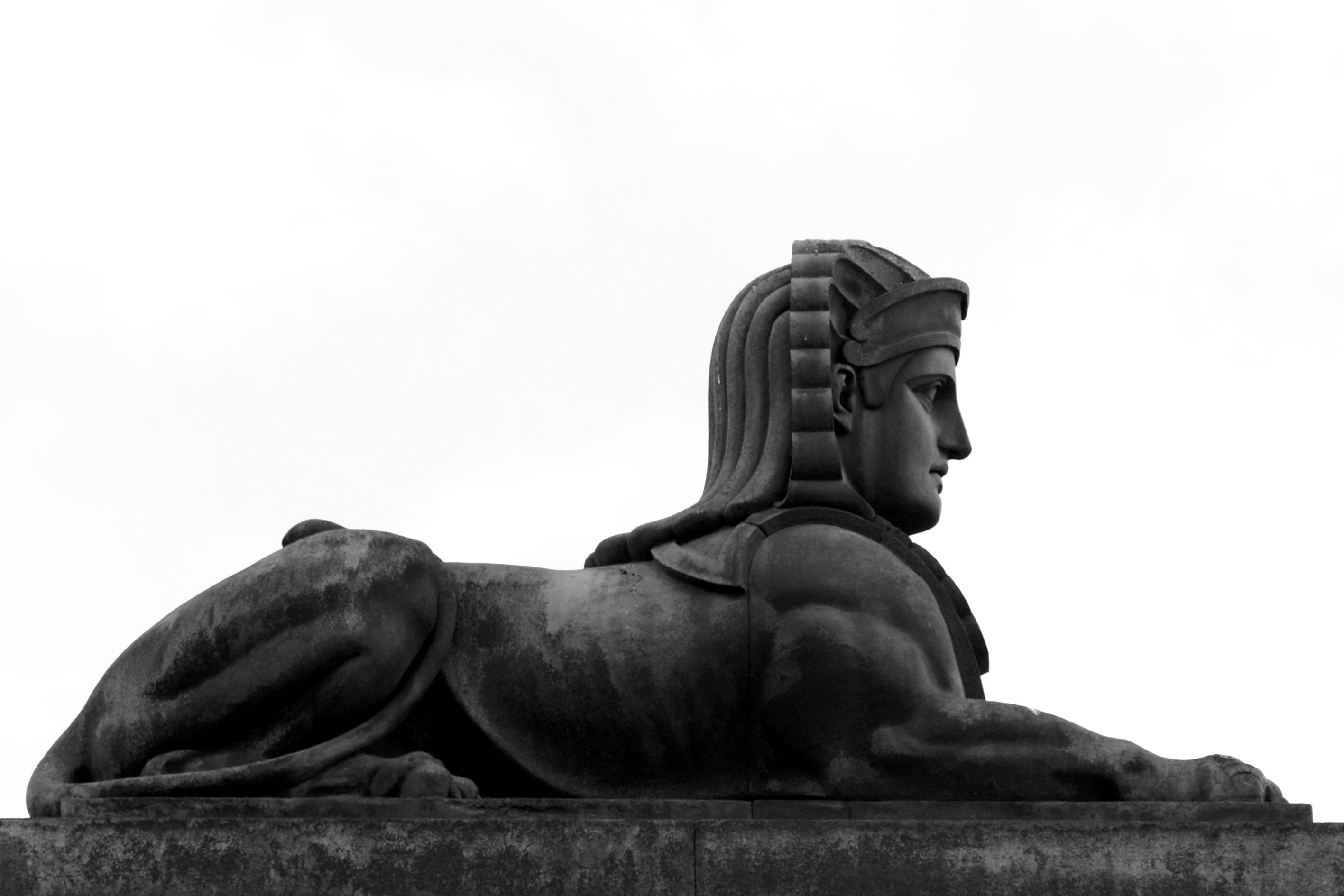
One of Playfair's Sphynxes

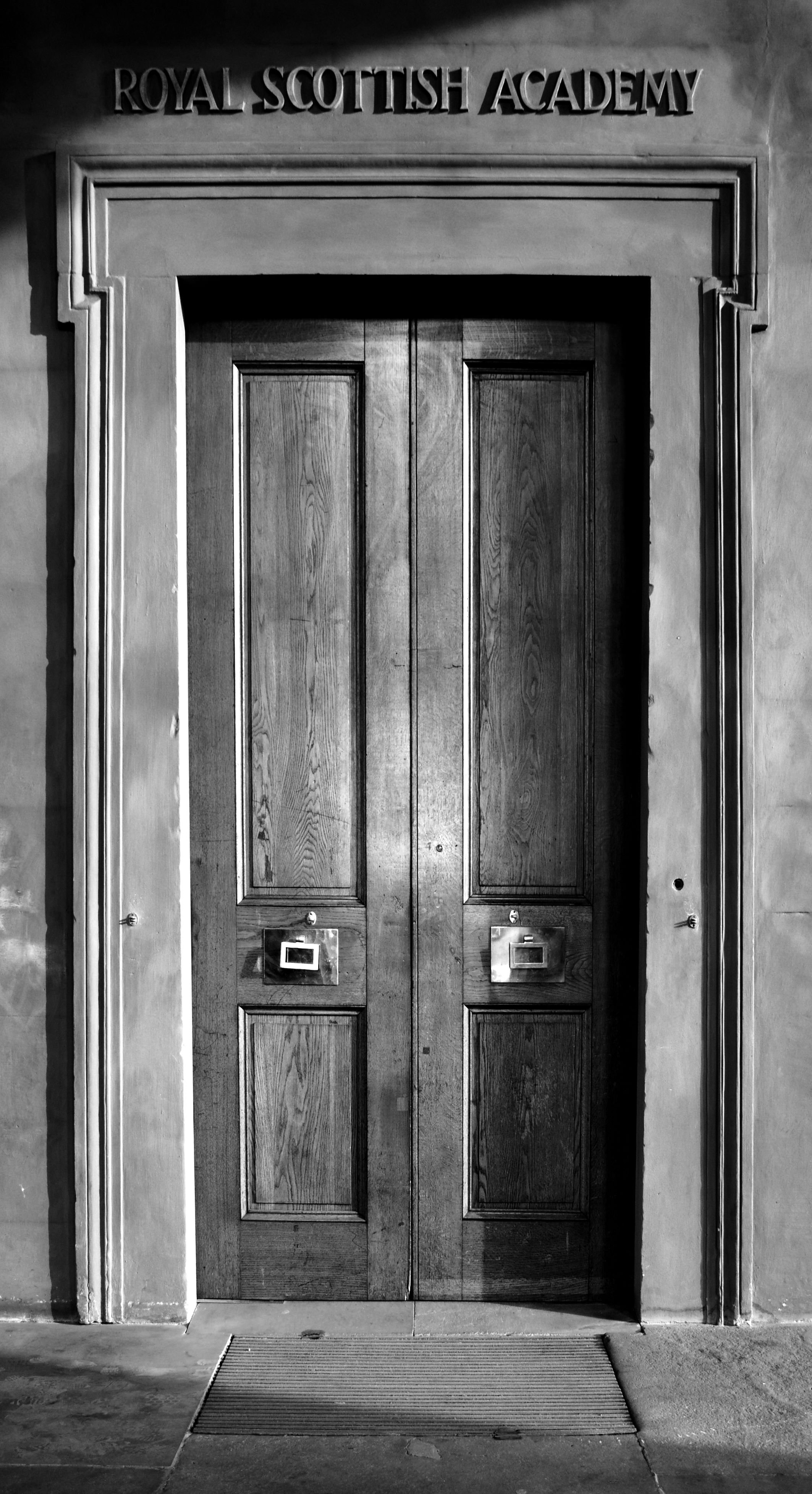
One of the side doors

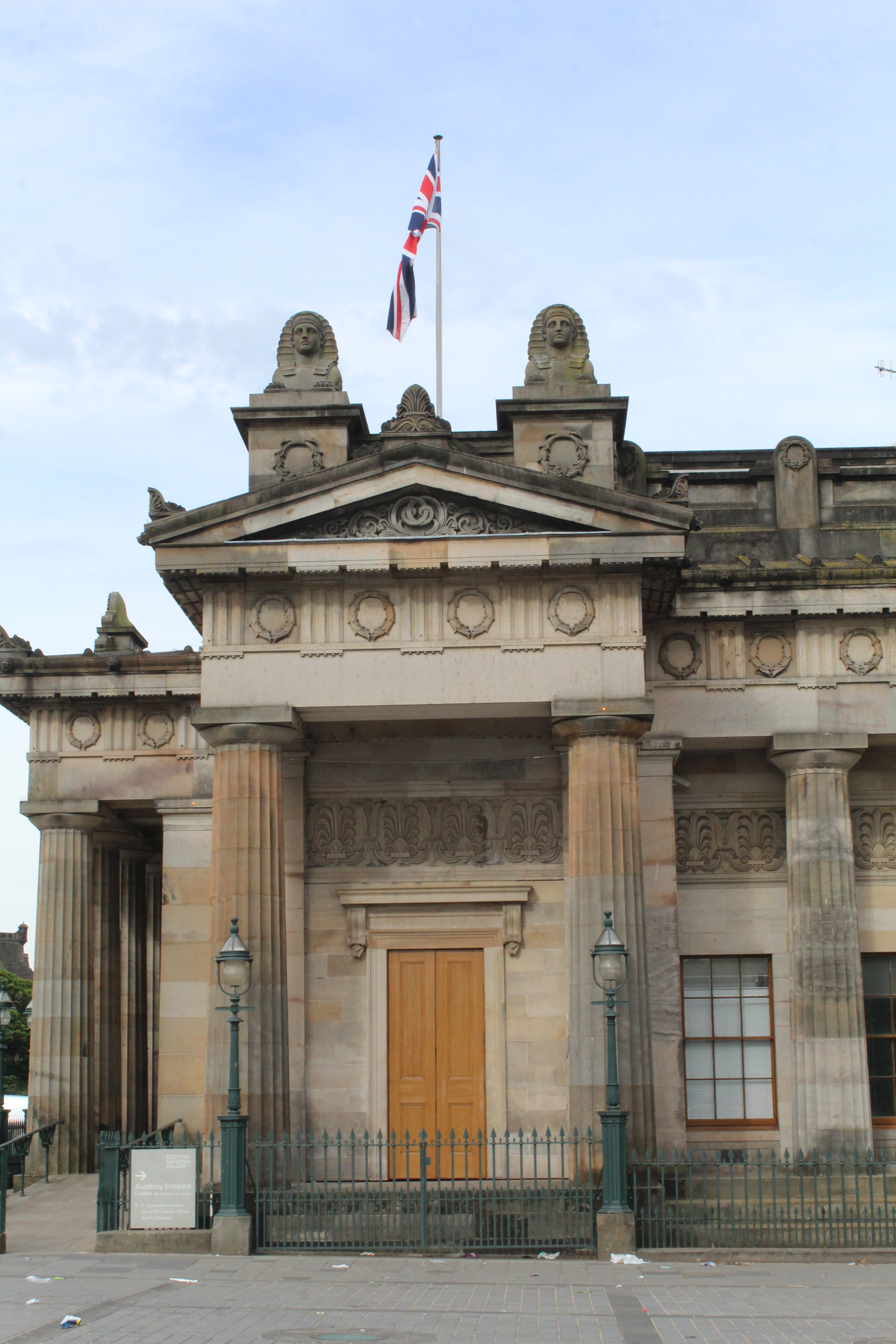
A side portico

The Royal Scottish Academy Building is frequently confused with the neighbouring building, the Scottish National Gallery (SNG), due to their architectural similarity. The RSA Building is surrounded by fluted Doric columns, while the SNG is distinguished by its colonnade of plainer Ionic columns.

Distinguishing the two neighbouring galleries

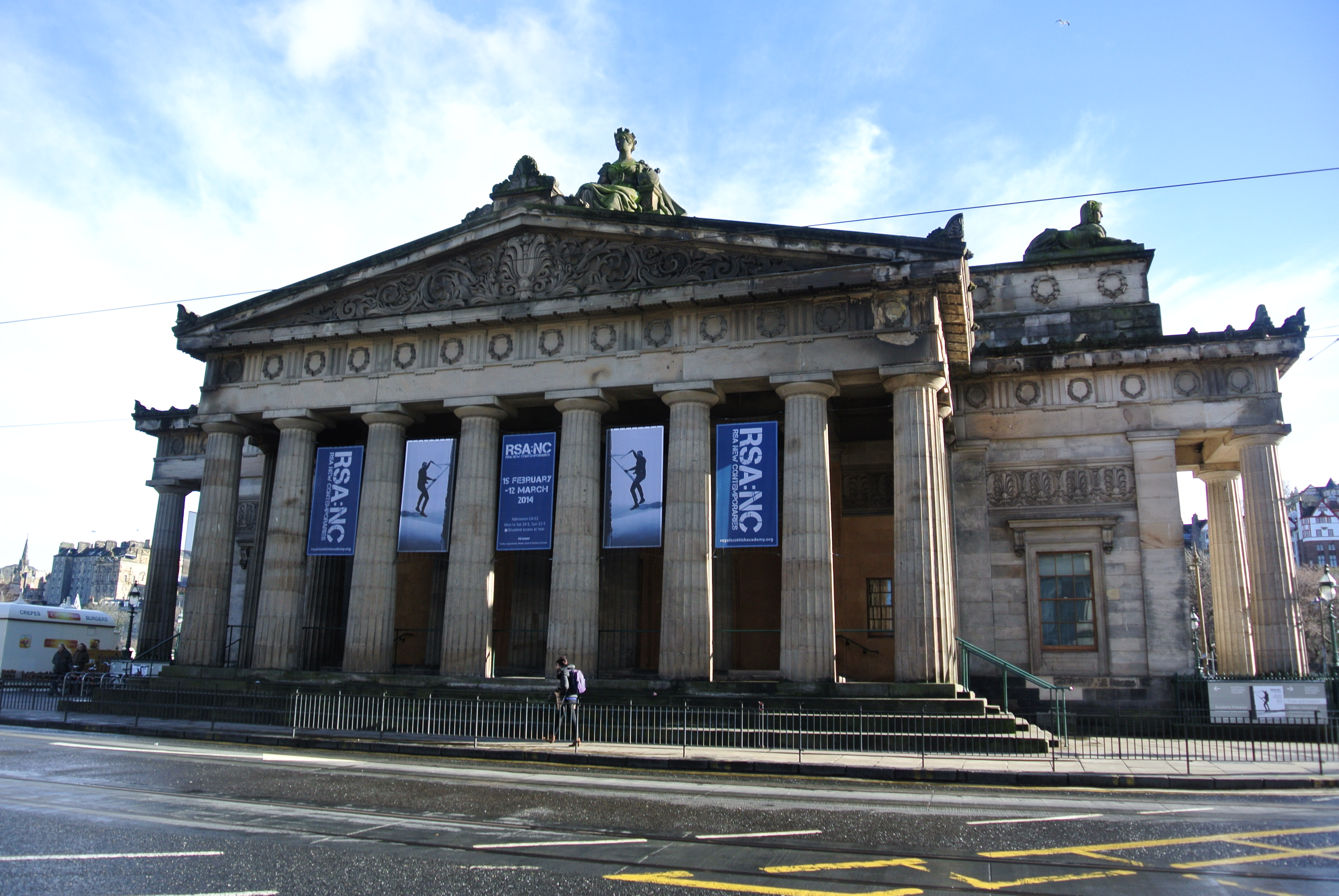
The RSA Building with fluted Doric columns

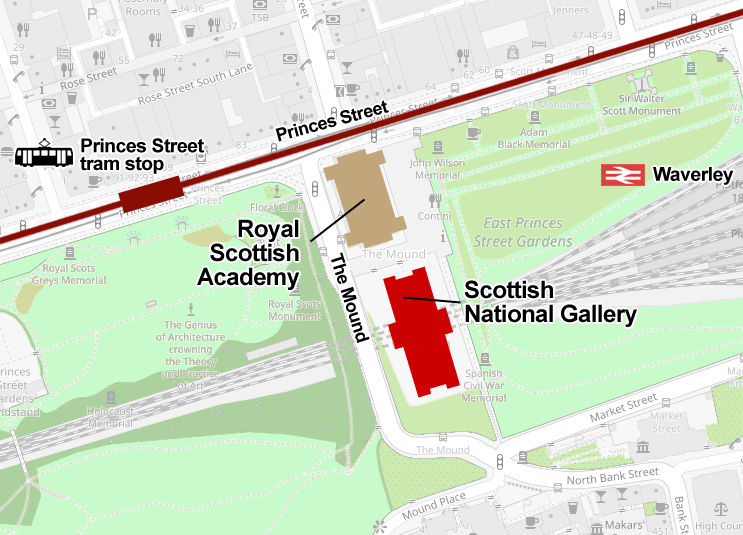
Both the RSA and the SNG are located on The Mound, with the SNG to the rear

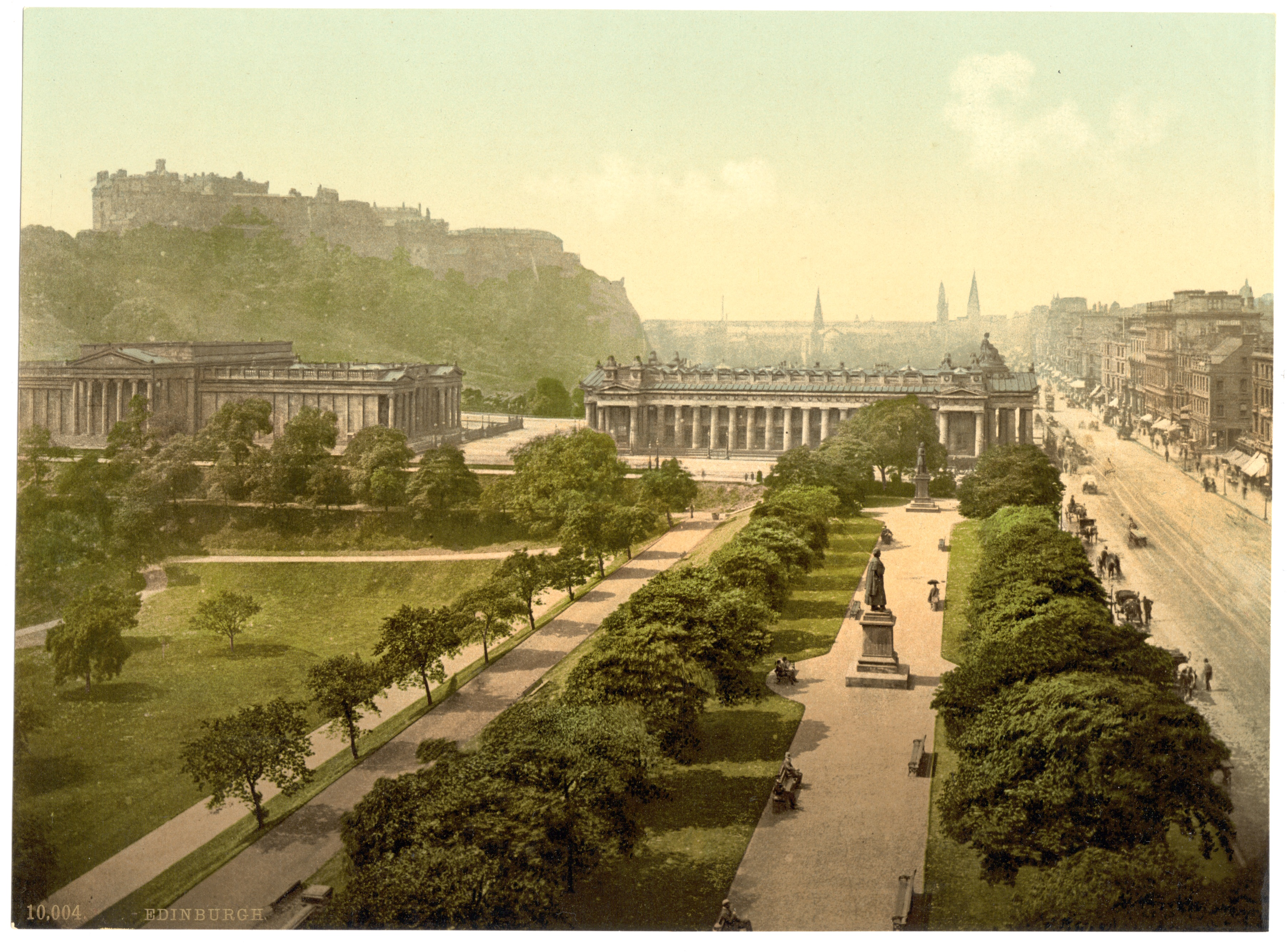
The RSA (right) and the SNG (left)

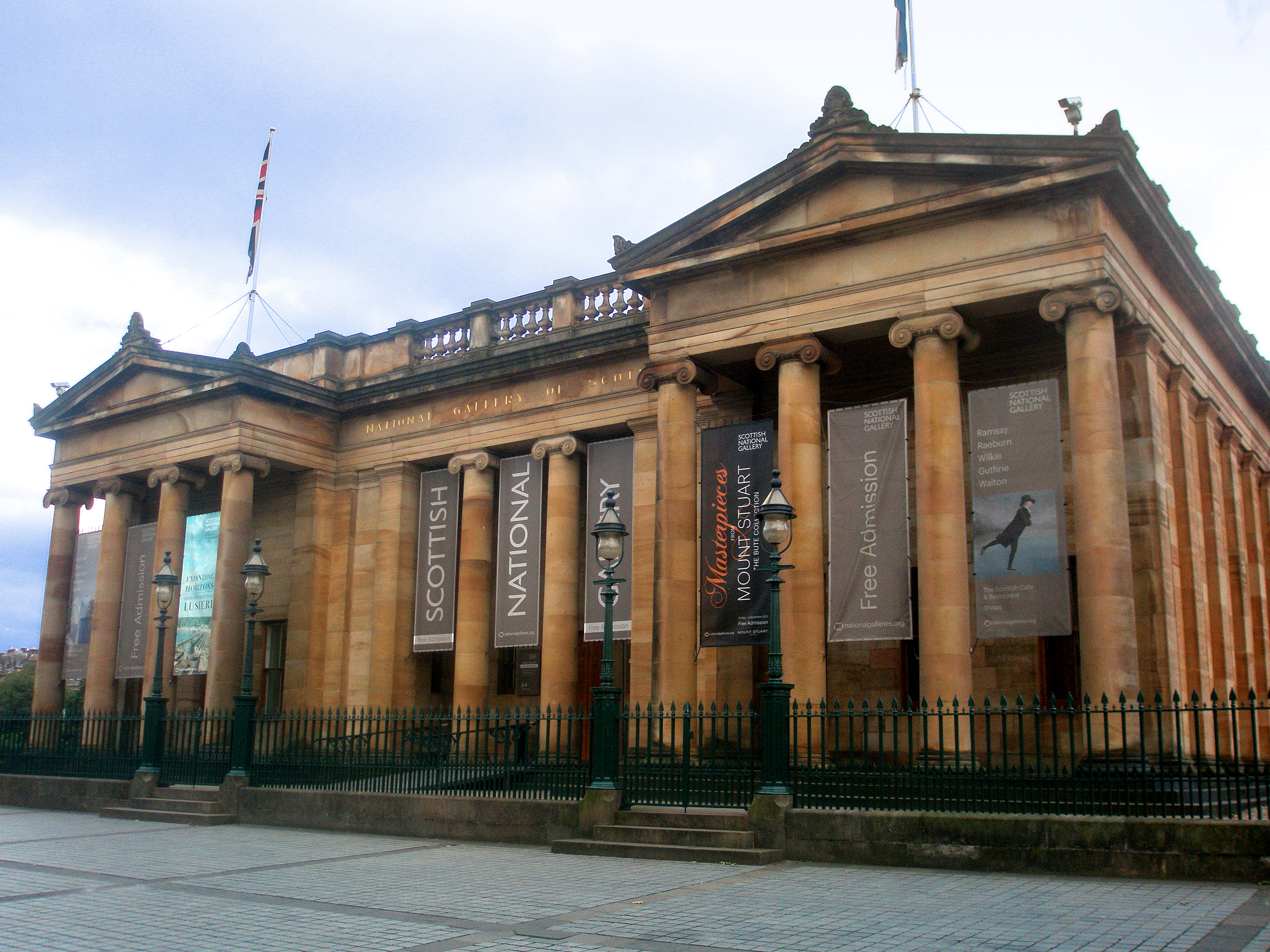
The Scottish National Gallery, with Ionic columns

== Exhibitions ==
Exhibition space is shared throughout the year by the RSA with the NGS and other exhibiting societies: the Society of Scottish Artists, Visual Arts Scotland and the Royal Society of Watercolourists.
