= Princes Street =

Street in Edinburgh, Scotland

Coordinates: 55°57′4.73″N 3°12′3.16″W

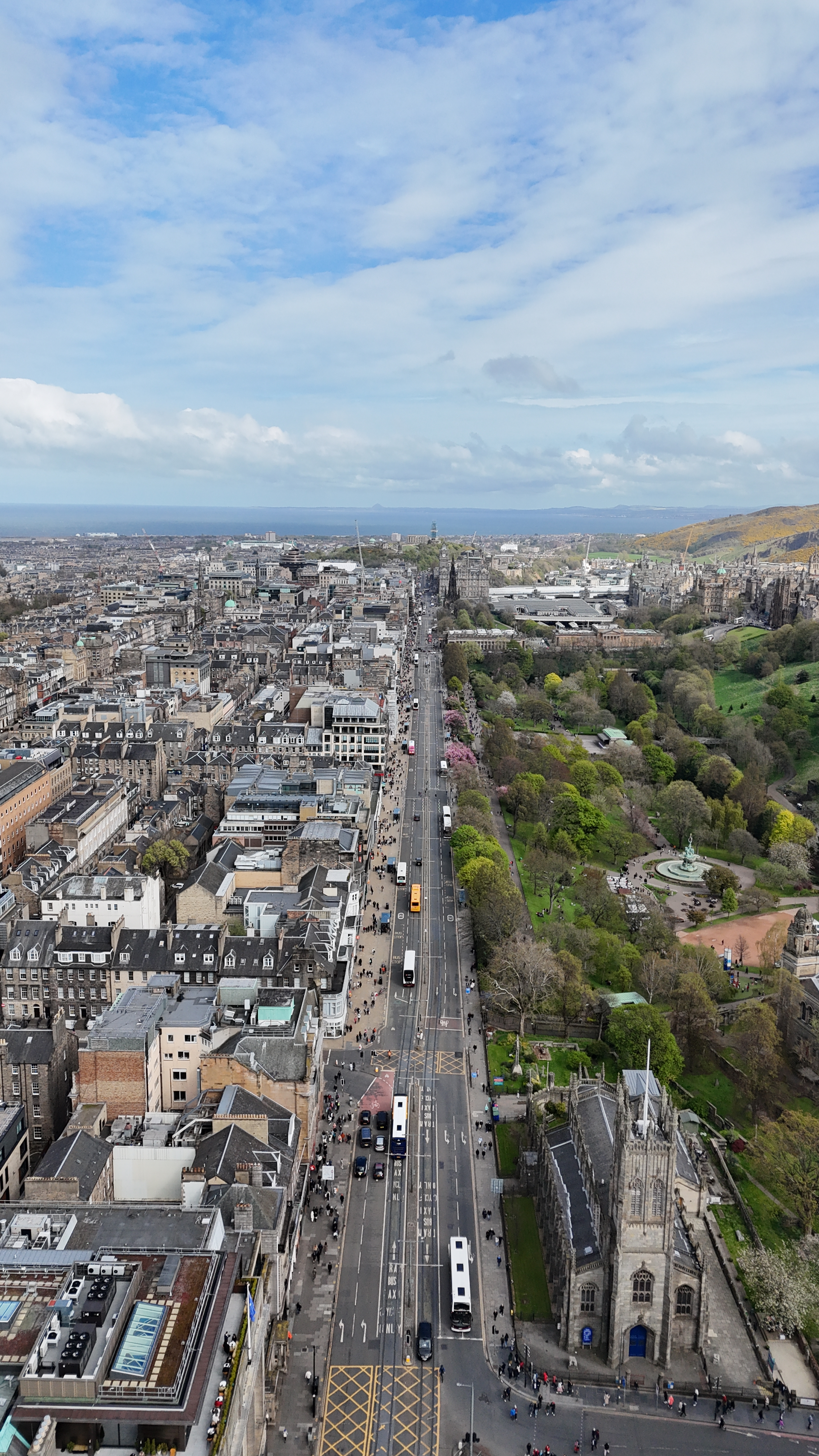
Aerial view of Princes Street

Princes Street (Scottish Gaelic: Sràid nam Prionnsachan) is one of the major thoroughfares in central Edinburgh, Scotland, and the main shopping street in the capital. It is the southernmost street of Edinburgh's New Town, stretching around 1.2 km (three quarters of a mile) from Lothian Road in the west, to Leith Street in the east. The street has few buildings on the south side and looks over Princes Street Gardens with panoramic views of the Old Town and Edinburgh Castle beyond. Most of the street is limited to trams, buses and taxis with only the east end open to all traffic.

== History ==
=== 18th century ===
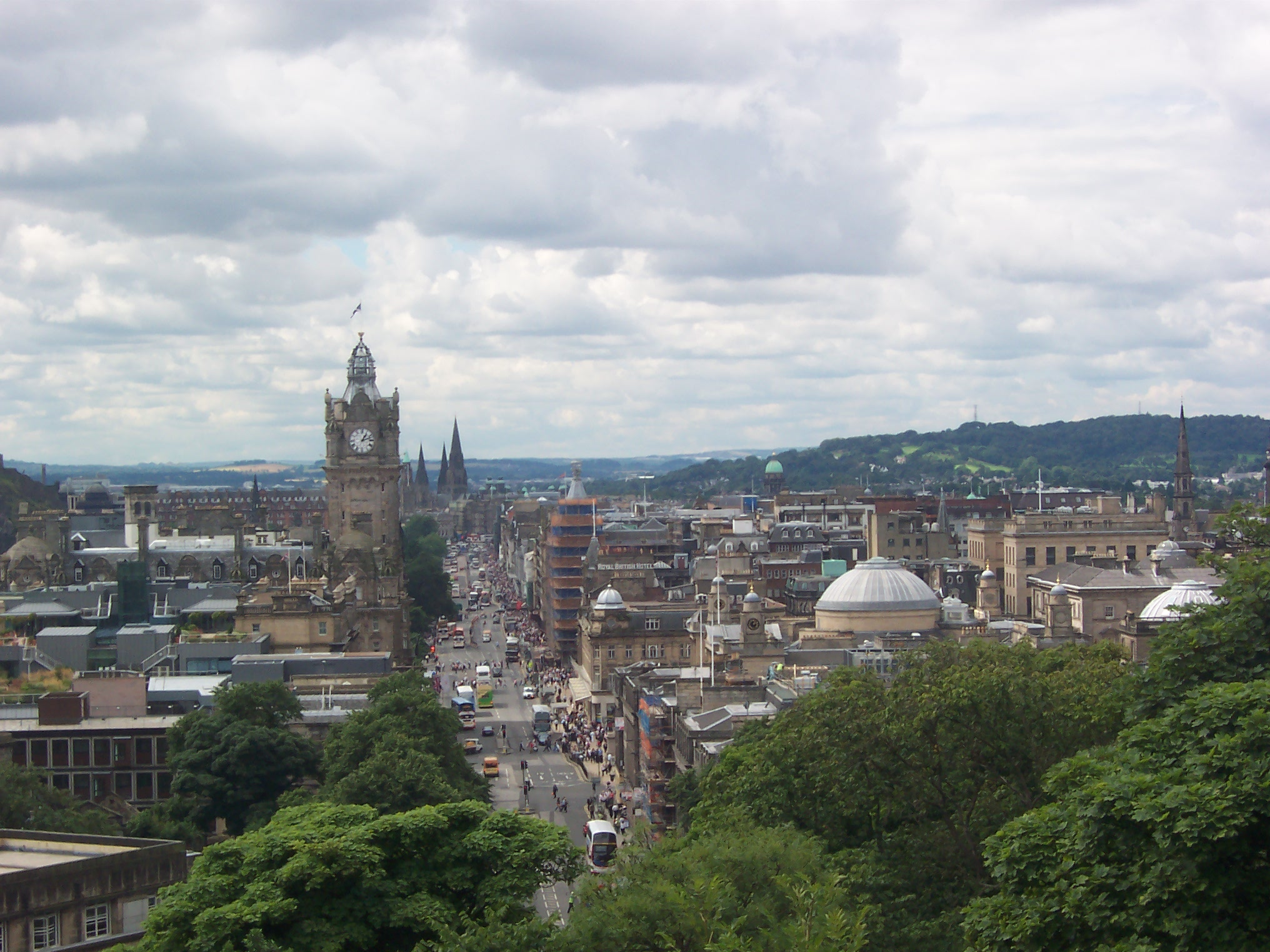
View of Princes Street from Calton Hill.

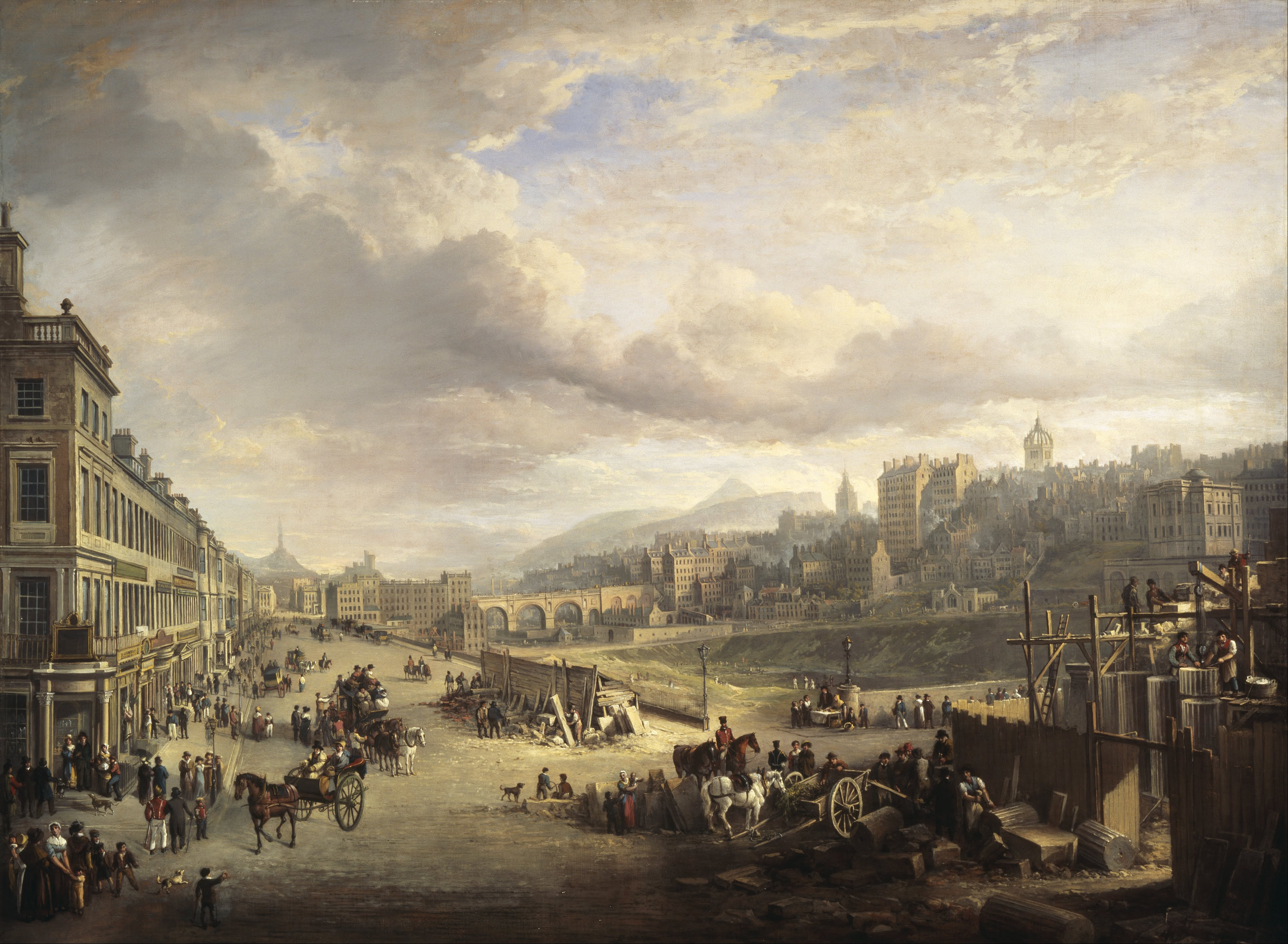
Princes Street by Alexander Nasmyth, 1825

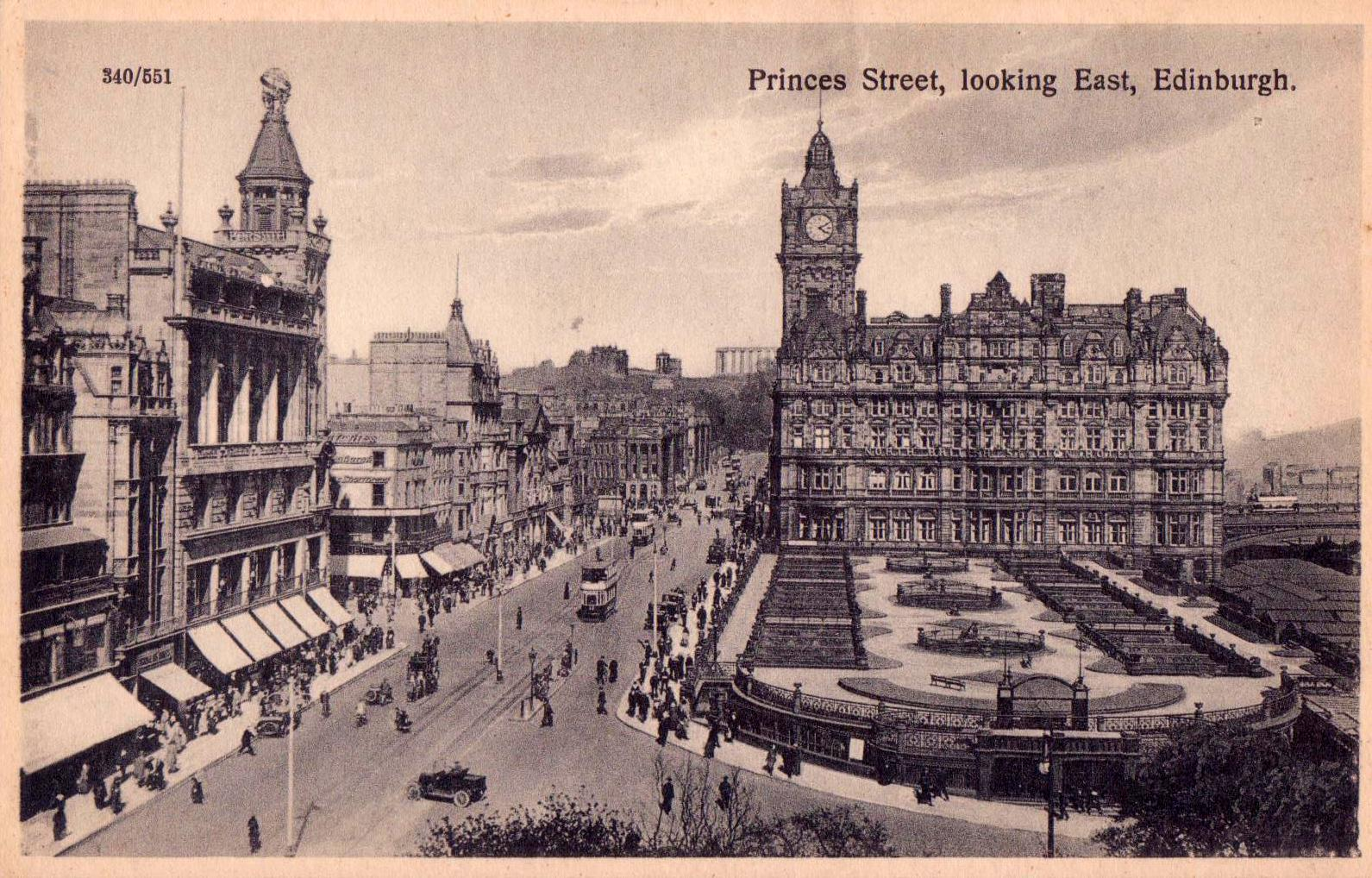
Princes Street, looking East, c. 1910–1915.

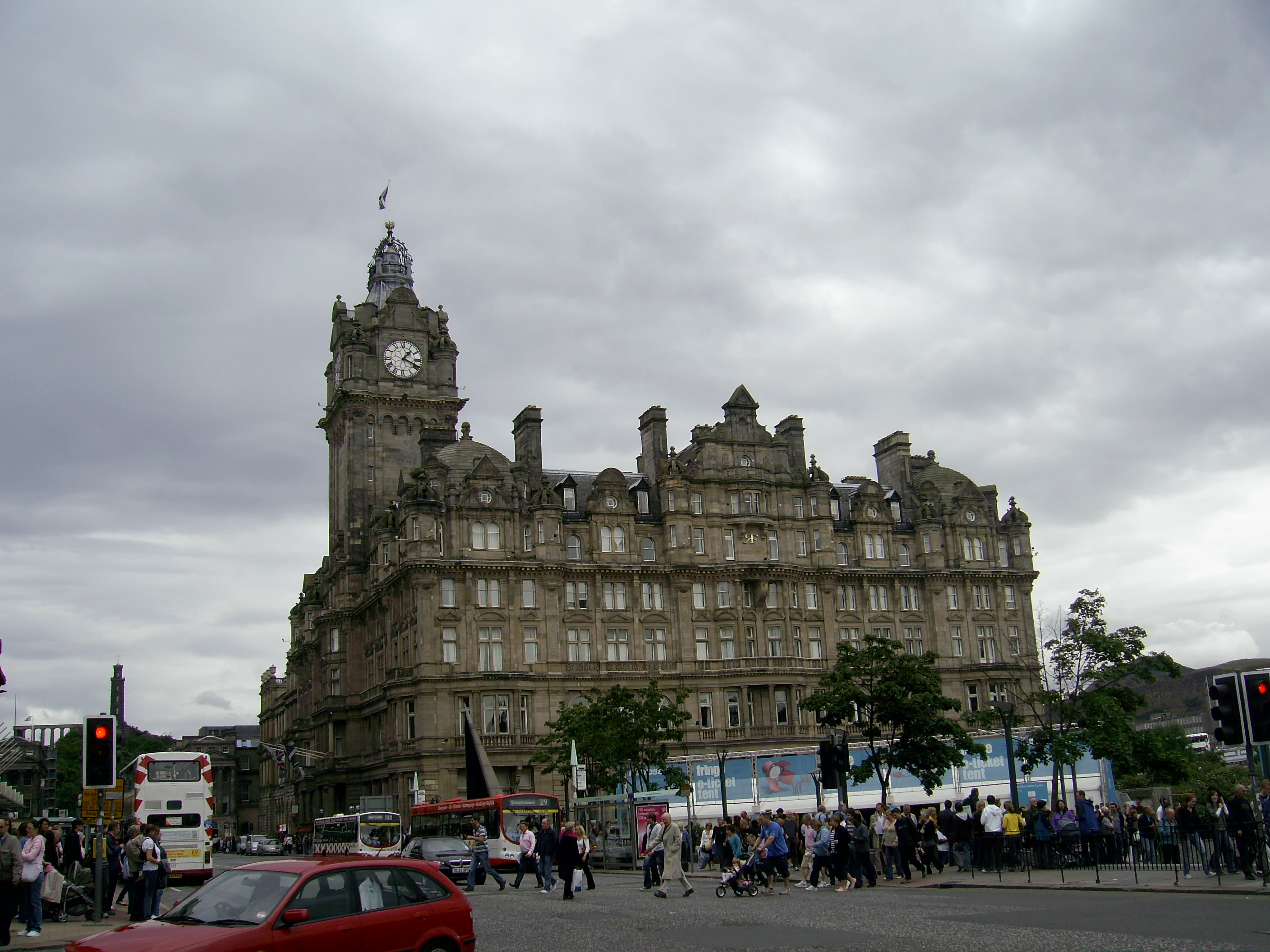
The Balmoral Hotel, originally called the North British Hotel, on Princes Street above Waverley Station.

The street lies on the line of a medieval country lane known as the Lang Dykes and under the first plan for the New Town was to have been called St Giles Street after the patron saint of Edinburgh. However, when King George III was shown a print or drawing of the proposed New Town by Sir John Pringle, he objected to the name as he associated it with the notorious slum area of St Giles, London. At Pringle's suggestion, the street was instead named Prince's Street after King George's eldest son, Prince George, Duke of Rothesay (later King George IV) as recounted in his 1767 letter to the Lord Provost of Edinburgh. By the late 1830s the apostrophe in the name (which had also sometimes been written as Princes' Street) had largely fallen out of use, giving the street its present-day name of Princes Street. The apparent plurality in the name has given rise to various erroneous explanations of the name.

It was laid out according to formal plans for Edinburgh's New Town, now known as the First New Town. These were devised by the architect James Craig and building began around 1770. Princes Street represented a critical part of the plan, being the outer edge, facing Edinburgh Castle and the original city, Edinburgh Old Town. Originally all buildings had the same format: set back from the street with stairs down to a basement and stairs up to the ground floor with two storeys and an attic above. Of this original format only one such property, no.95, remains in its original form.

=== 19th century ===
Through the 19th century most buildings were redeveloped at a larger scale and the street evolved from residential to mainly retail uses.

From the 1880s the street, with its commanding views in combination with great ease of access, became a popular street upon which to locate hotels. The railway companies created huge anchor hotels at either end: the Caledonian Hotel to the west, and North British Hotel to the east. In between were the Royal British Hotel, Old Waverley Hotel, and Mount Royal Hotel, all of which survive. Princes Street was also home to two leading department stores, Jenners founded in 1838 and rebuilt in 1893–1895, and Forsyth's built in 1906–1907, both technically advanced and architecturally ornate buildings for their time.

=== 20th century ===
By the 1930s the architecture of Princes Street had a very mixed character. in 1949 A Civic Survey & Plan for the City & Royal Burgh of Edinburgh by Patrick Abercrombie & Derek Plumstead proposed tighter control of design to create a more coherent appearance. The Princes Street Panel of architects took up this cause in 1954 and their 1967 report proposed comprehensive redevelopment with Modernist buildings to incorporate a first-floor level walkway running the length of the street. The plan was partially put into operation, resulting in the demolition of seven buildings - Boots, the New Club, the Life Association Building and the North British & Mercantile Insurance Company of particular architectural note - before the approach was dropped in 1979. Two of the Princes Street Panel buildings, the former British Home Stores at number 64, and the New Club at numbers 84–87, are now listed buildings.

On the 9th June 1991 a fire burned down the Palace Hotel (built 1888) on the corner of Princes Street and Castle Street. Started by teenagers exploring the empty property, the building was demolished and a new office building completed by 1995.

The local authority's property development company, the EDI Group Limited, proposed to create a new shopping mall beneath the entire Princes Street carriageway, opening on to East and West Princes Street Gardens. It created a controversy as it encroached upon the gardens and resulted in a public inquiry in 1999 and the scheme subsequently collapsed.

=== 21st century ===
The Princes Street underground mall was resurrected in 2002 but only for East Princes Street Gardens. This too was abandoned in 2004 due to controversy.

The challenge of small plots and unused upper floors restricting development has variously been addressed by Princes Street Edinburgh : City Centre Strategy & Action Plan (2003), the Princes Street Development Framework (2007) and the Princes Street Edinburgh : City Centre Strategy & Action Plan (2025).

Princes Street was the scene of rioting in 2005 related to the 31st G8 summit referred to in the press as "The Battle of Princes Street".

Several UK well-known high street brands such as Boots, H&M, and Marks & Spencer, remain but many big name retailers migrated to the St James Quarter when it opened in 2021, leaving Princes Street in a period of transition.

Apple opened a store in the former Woolworths in 2014, with a Motel One on the upper floors.

British Home Stores closed in 2016 with the upper floors becoming a Premier Inn, and Uniqlo taking the retail levels in 2024.

The Royal Over-Seas League closed in 2018 after 88 years at number 100, replaced by a Red Carnation Hotel in 2024.

House of Fraser (previously Binns) closed in 2018 and reopened as the Johnnie Walker Experience in 2024.

Topman and Topshop (located in the former Forsyth's) closed in January 2021 following the administration of the Arcadia group.

Jenners closed in May 2021 in advance of redevelopment by Anders Holch Povlsen. In January 2023, a major fire broke out on the site in which a firefighter, Barry Martin, suffered critical injuries and subsequently died. As of October 2026, conversion of the site to hotel, food and retail use is expected to be completed in 2027.

Debenhams closed in May 2021, with Legal & General then planning a hotel conversion, but the building was subsequently purchased by Criterion Capital in 2024 with plans for a Zedwell Hotel. On 9 July 2026, number 109-110, part of Debenhams and built as the Palace Hotel, was severely damaged by fire leaving the facade close to collapse. Princes Street was closed to pedestrians and traffic between Frederick Street and South Charlotte Street for 7 weeks while the facade was stabilised, reopening on 29 August 2026.

== Princes Street Gardens and south side ==
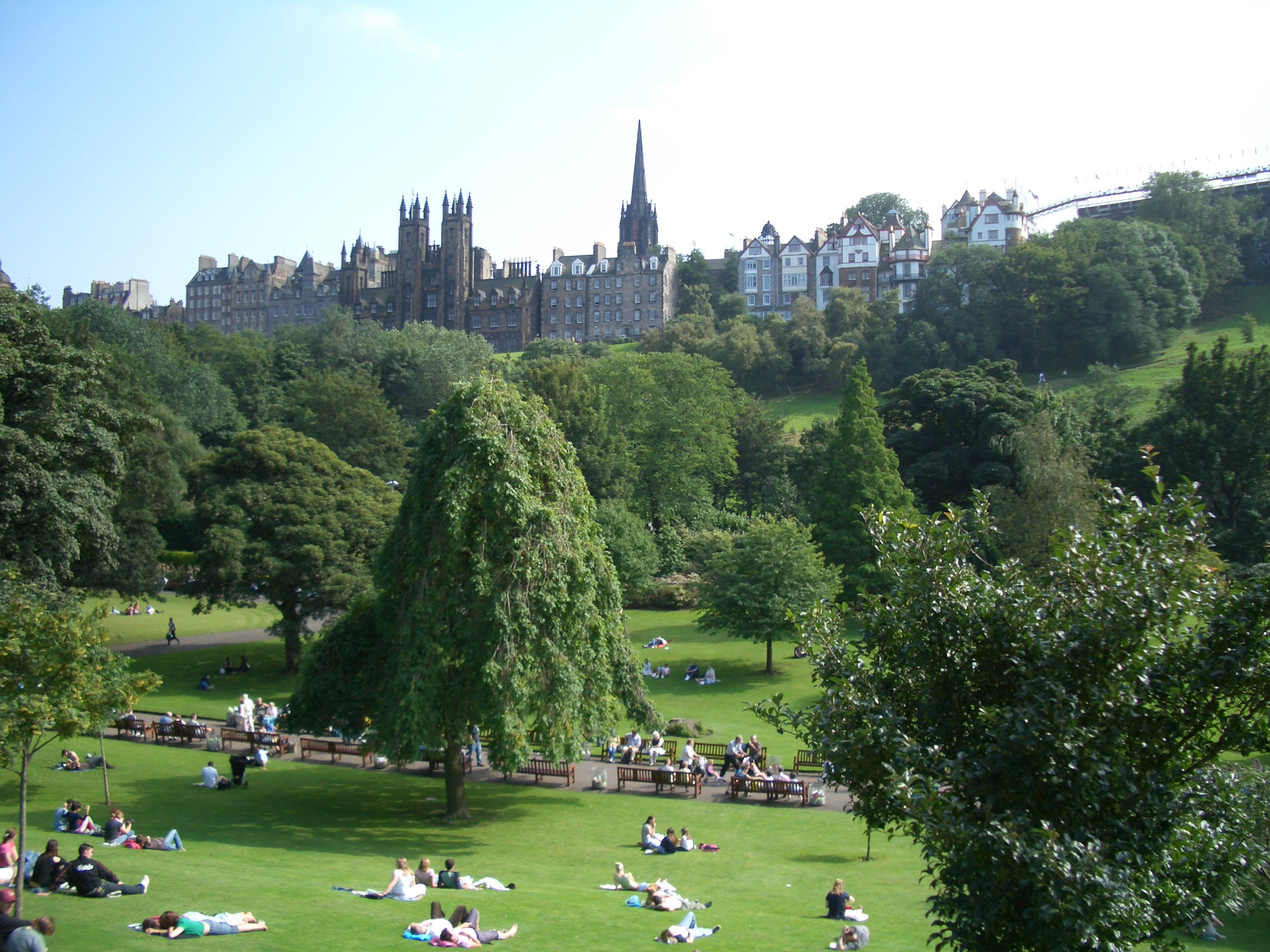
The Old Town from West Princes Street Gardens

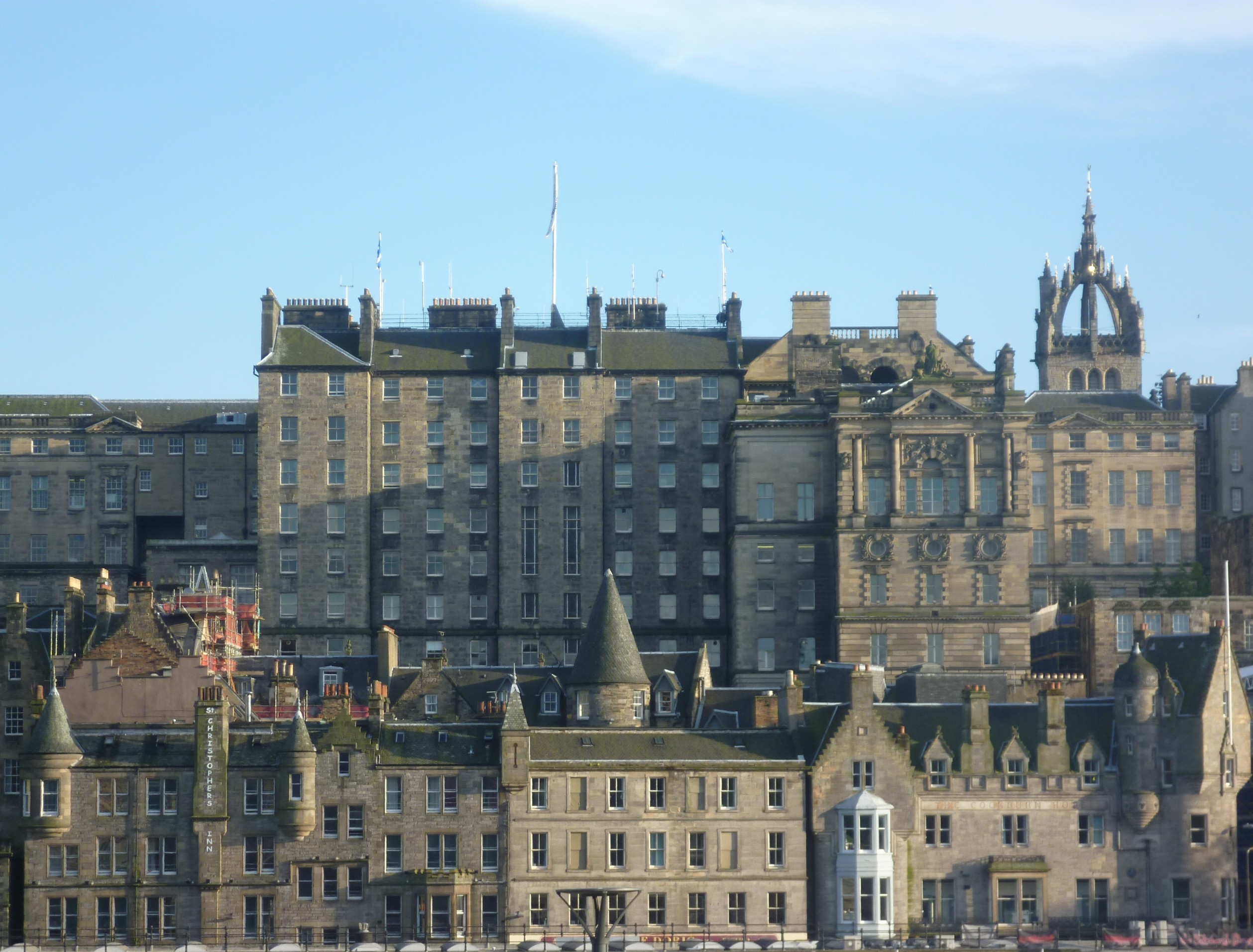
Back of the High Street from the east end of Princes Street

During the construction of the New Town, the polluted waters of the Nor Loch were drained, and the area was converted into private gardens called Princes Street Gardens. This was taken over by the Edinburgh Council in the late-nineteenth century, by which time most of the street was commercial and there was no great need for private residential gardens. The width of Princes Street was greatly increased soon after, onto what was the northern edge of the gardens. Due to the much lower position of the gardens this led to the creation of the steep embankment on the north side, still visible today. The gardens are one of the many green spaces in the heart of Edinburgh.

The Gardens contain the Ross Bandstand (an open-air theatre), a war memorial to US soldiers of Scottish descent and a floral clock, together with other attractions. Two of the main Scottish art galleries, the Royal Scottish Academy and the National Gallery of Scotland, are located at the foot of The Mound and are served by Princes Street tram stop. Further along is the Scott Monument, a huge intricate Gothic monument dedicated to Sir Walter Scott, the author of the Waverley Novels, after which is named Waverley station, which lies at the east end of the Gardens, its westward lines dividing them. Next to the station on its north side is the former railway hotel, previously known as the North British Hotel, latterly renamed the Balmoral Hotel, and the North Bridge which sails at high level over the station. The hotel has a counterpart at the extreme west end of Princes Street. The Caledonian Hotel, now the Waldorf Astoria Edinburgh - The Caledonian, sits at the north end of Lothian Road. This was built by the Caledonian Railway for their Princes Street Station which closed in the 1960s along with the lines it served.

At the west end of Princes Street, St John's Episcopal Church at the corner of Lothian Road is built at street level above a basement crypt and a small churchyard. In addition, there are several fair trade outlets in this space as part of the church, whilst St Cuthbert's Church stands just to the south of it, in a far larger and older churchyard, west of the gardens.

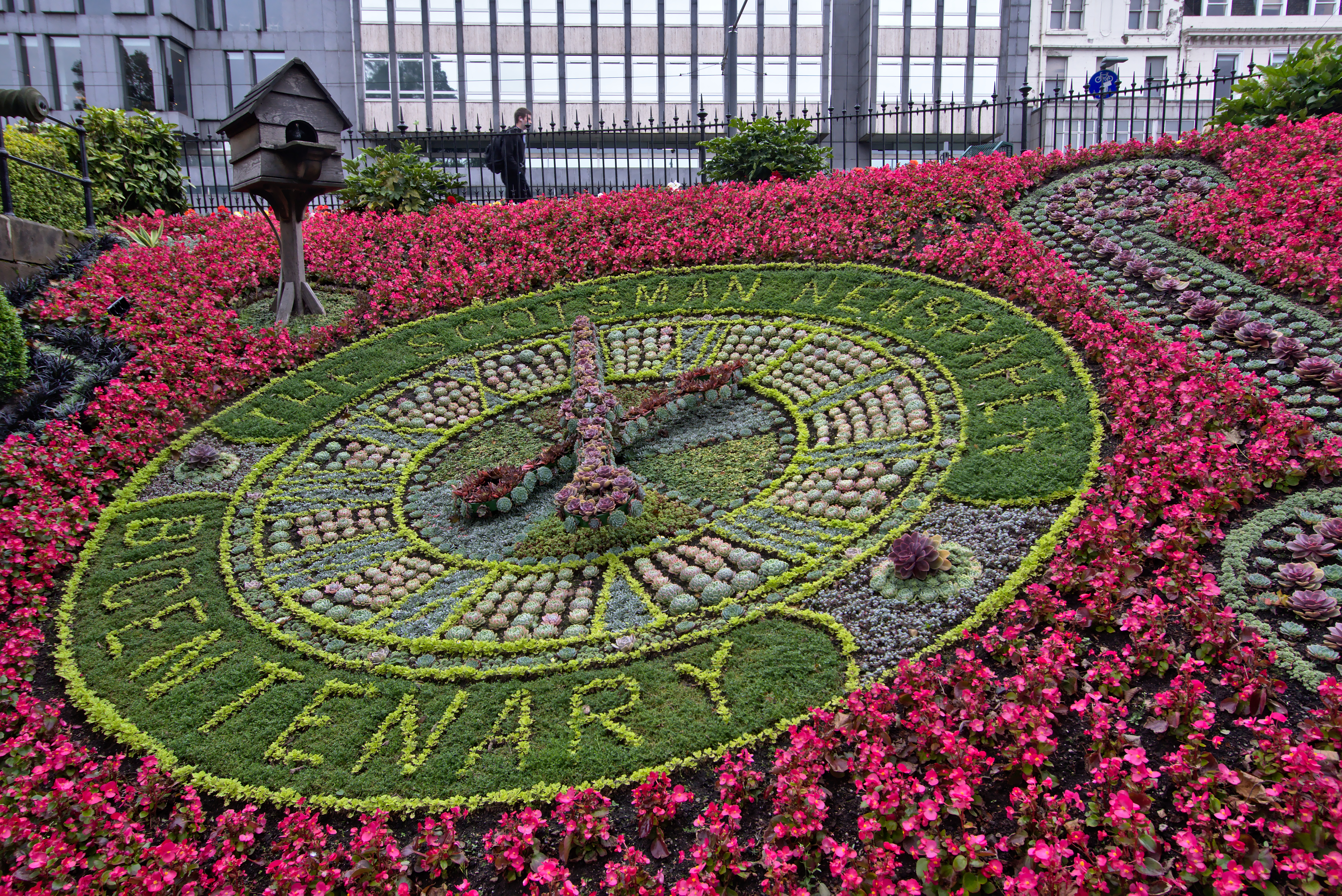
The Floral Clock, 2011

The floral clock dates from 1903 when it was first planted by the Park Superintendent, John McHattie. It displays a different theme every summer.

Princes Street remains popular, although it has now fallen from its status as the most expensive place to rent shop space in the UK outside of London. Princes Street may be one of the few streets in the UK to have an order of Parliament placed on it to prevent any further building on the south side, so as to preserve its open vista.

== Transport ==
=== Road ===
Only the eastern third of Princes Street is open to general traffic. The main length is restricted to trams, buses, taxis and cyclists only.

=== Rail ===
Edinburgh Waverley railway station lies at the eastern end of Princes Street.

=== Tram ===
The Princes Street tram stop is an in-road island, situated just west of the Royal Scottish Academy near the foot of the Mound.

| Preceding station | Edinburgh Trams | Following station |
|---|---|---|
| St Andrew Square towards Newhaven | Newhaven – Edinburgh Airport | West End towards Airport |

=== Buses ===
Princes Street is the focus of the majority of bus routes served by Lothian Buses.

Edinburgh Bus Station is around 100 m (330 ft) north of the east end of Princes Street, in the north-east corner of St Andrew Square.

== Connections ==
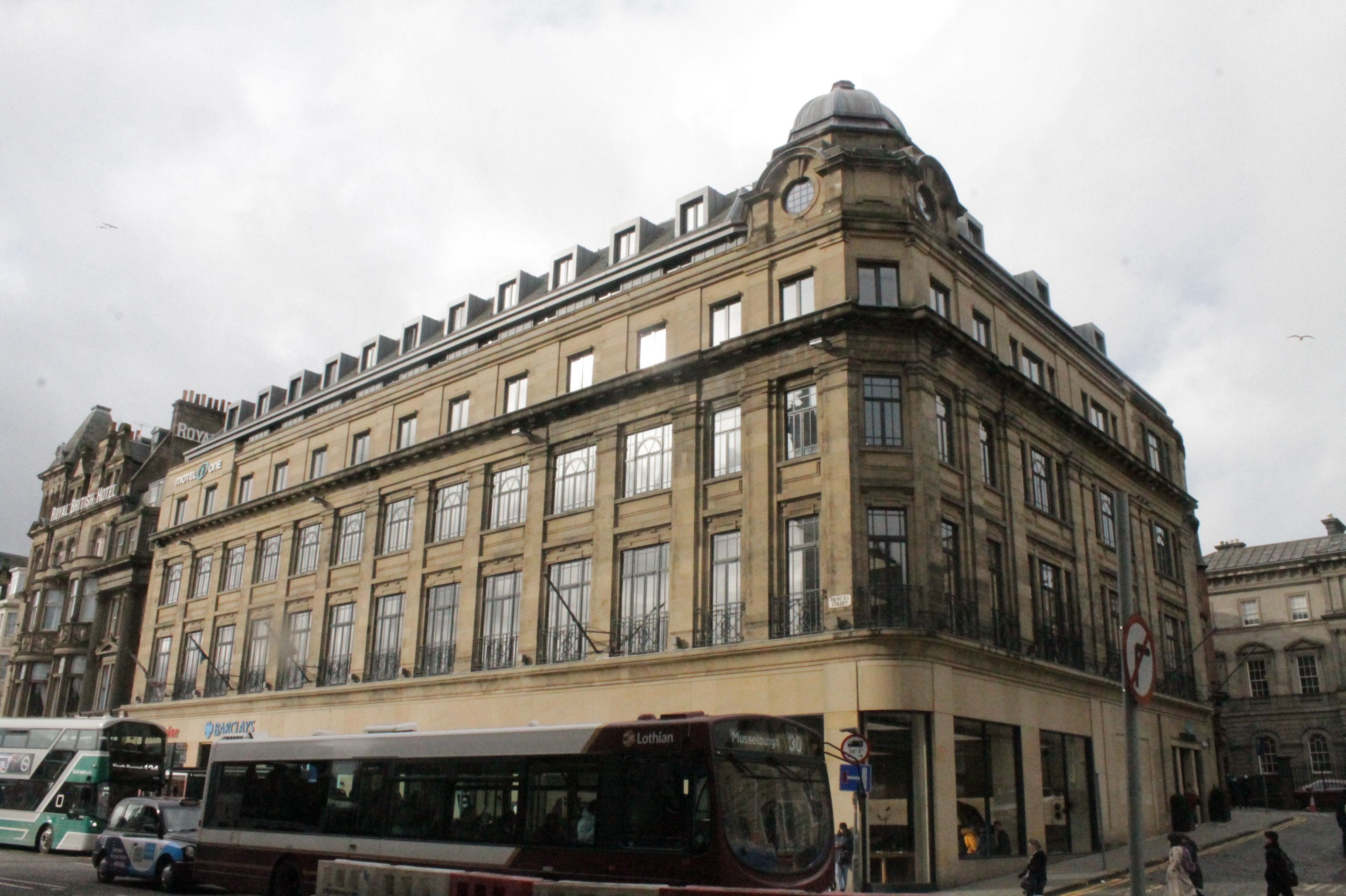
Apple Store, Motel One, Princes Street

- One of the main streets of the New Zealand city of Dunedin is named Princes Street after the street in Edinburgh. Dunedin is the Gaelic form of Edinburgh's name (Dùn Èideann) and many of Dunedin's streets duplicate Edinburgh street names.
- In 1970, James H. Howe composed a march for military band, called "Pride of Princes Street".
- A stone run on East Falkland in the Falkland Islands was named "Princes Street" by Charles Darwin, who studied at the University of Edinburgh. It is around four miles (6 km) long, and he thought it reminded him of the stone setts of Princes Street.

== Popular culture ==
- The opening scene of the 1996 film Trainspotting shows the main character Mark Renton being chased by shop security guards along Princes Street.
- Sylvain Chomet's 2010 film The Illusionist features animated scenes depicting Princes Street as it was in the late-1950s.

== Famous residents ==
The street was originally built as a residential street and for the first 70 years held several notable residents:

- 1 – Richard Poole (physician)
- 2 – John Croall, famous coach-builder
- 3 – Very Rev John Drysdale
- 17 – Alexander Cowan's paper shop
- 38 – John Grieve, Lord Provost of Edinburgh
- 51 – Sir George Home (d.1803) and James Syme
- 65 – Robert Scott (engraver) and Alexander Fraser Tytler, Lord Woodhouselee and William Fraser Tytler
- 66 – Robert Bryson & Son, clockmakers
- 68 – Henry Erskine (lawyer)
- 85 – James Donaldson (publisher)
- 85 – Thomas Elder (Lord Provost of Edinburgh)
- 87 – Rev Thomas Randall Davidson of Muirhouse
- 90 – Hamilton & Inches, jeweller
- 92 – Alexander Handyside Ritchie, sculptor
- 93 – Charles Kirkpatrick Sharpe, antiquarian
- 95 – Robert Liston, surgeon
- 103 – James Maidment. legal author
- 113 – William Bonnar, artist
- 126 – William Forbes Skene

== Historic shops ==
- 58 – Alexander Adie, optician

== Long-standing shops ==
- 2–7 – Woolworths now converted to the Apple Store
- 62 – Romanes & Paterson since 1874
- Jenners since 1838 but rebuilt in 1895. Closed 2022. Damaged by fire 2023.
- 120 – Saxone Shoes
