= Princes Street (painting) =

Painting by Alexander Nasmyth

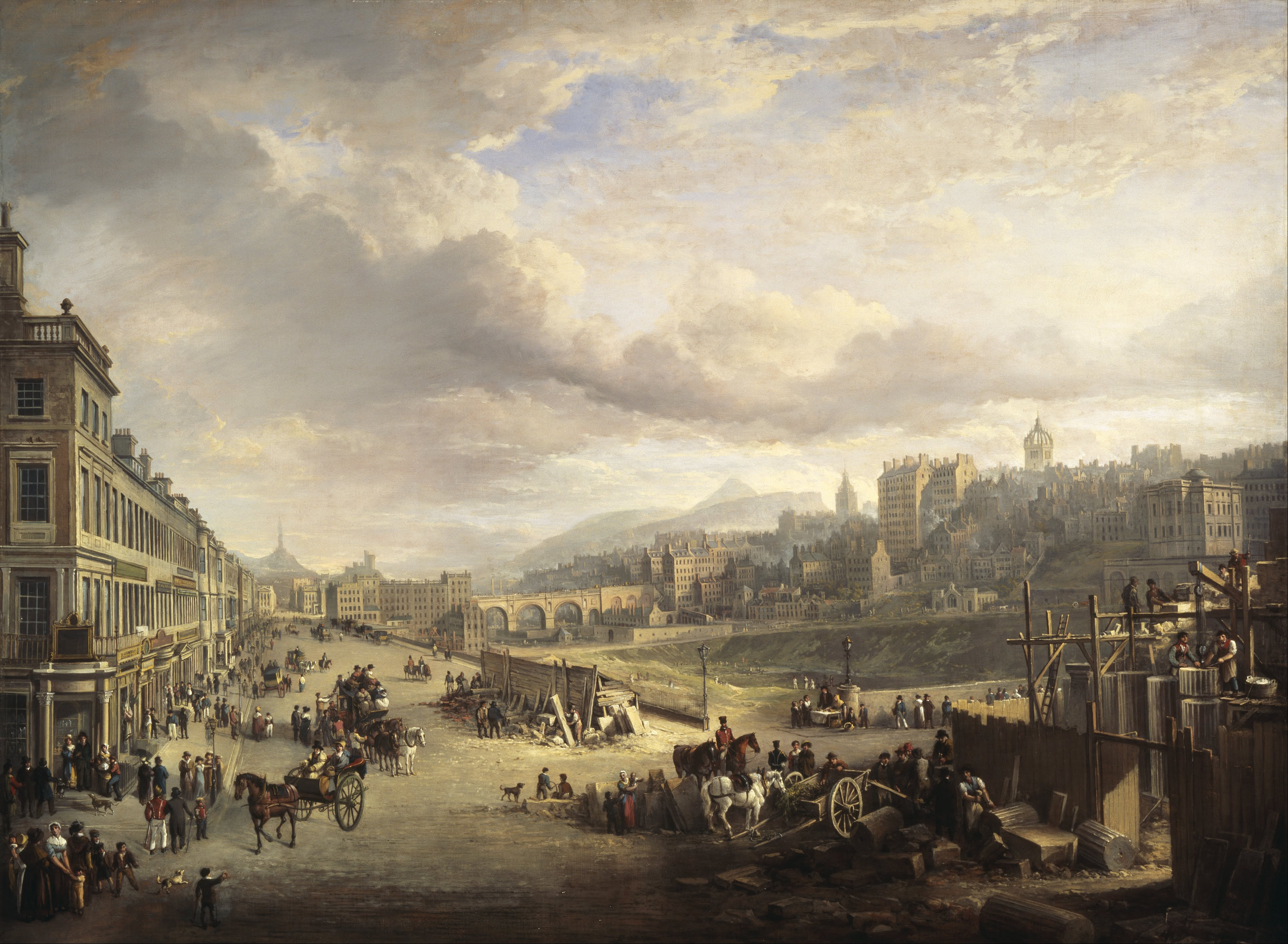
- Artist: Alexander Nasmyth
- Year: 1825
- Type: Oil on canvas, landscape
- Dimensions: 120.5 cm × 163.5 cm (47.4 in × 64.4 in)
- Location: Scottish National Gallery; Edinburgh

Princes Street is an oil on canvas landscape painting by the Scottish artist Alexander Nasmyth, from 1825. It is also known by the longer title Princes Street with the Commencement of the Building of the Royal Institution. Its main subject is a view of Princes Street in Edinburgh during the construction of the Royal Institution.

== Detail ==
The painting shows a view of Edinburgh city centre during the Regency era. The viewpoint looks east along Princes Street from the junction with The Mound and Hanover Street. In the foreground of the painting on the bottom right is a building site, where labourers can be seen erecting the columns of the new Royal Institution building (known today as the Royal Scottish Academy Building).

In the wider panoramic view of Edinburgh can be seen the New Town on the left and the Old Town on the right. In the distance are visible St Giles' Cathedral, the old North Bridge, Arthur's Seat and the Nelson Monument on Calton Hill.

Today it is in the collection of the Scottish National Gallery in Edinburgh.

Details visible in the painting

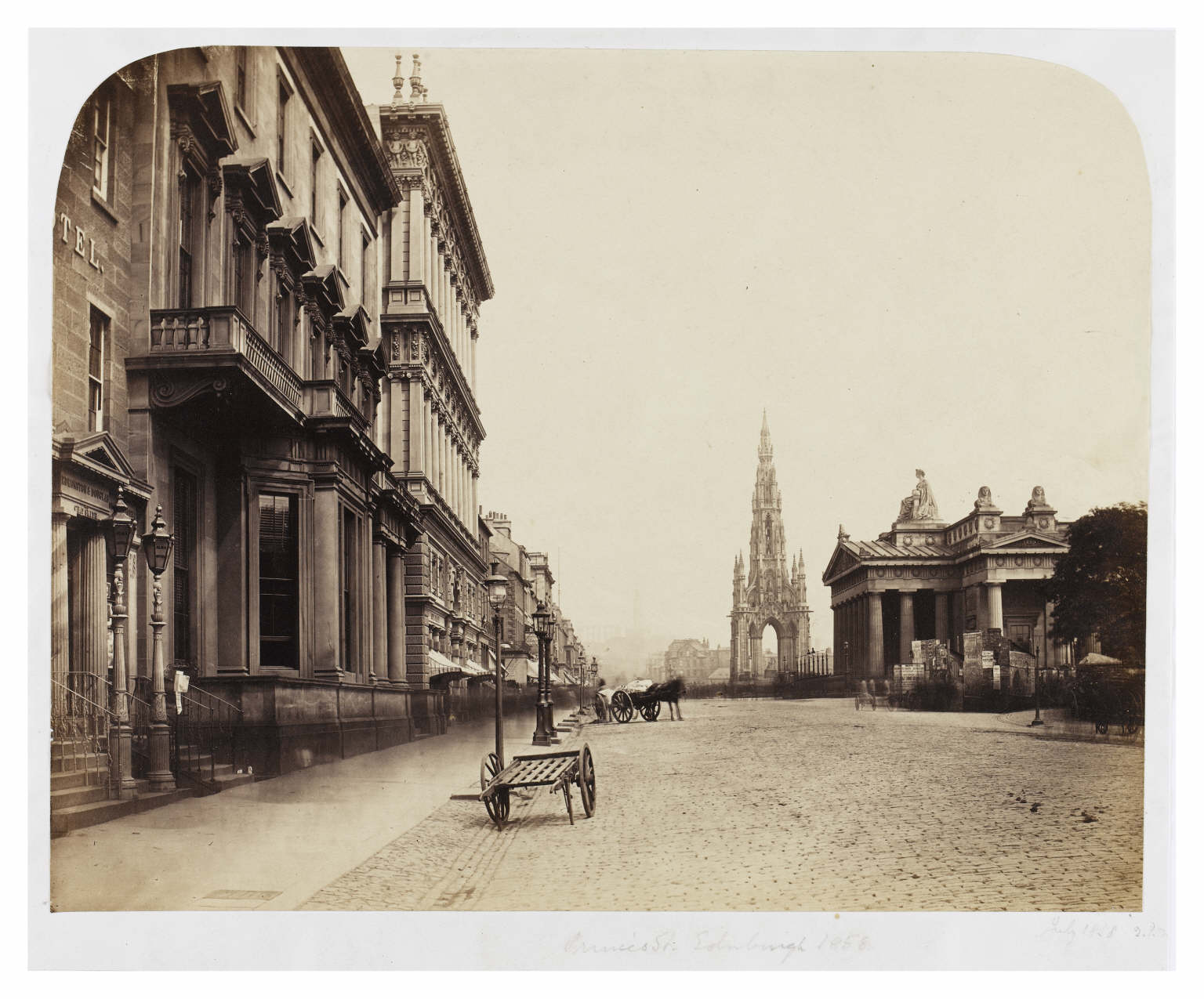
Approximate view of Princes Street 33 years later

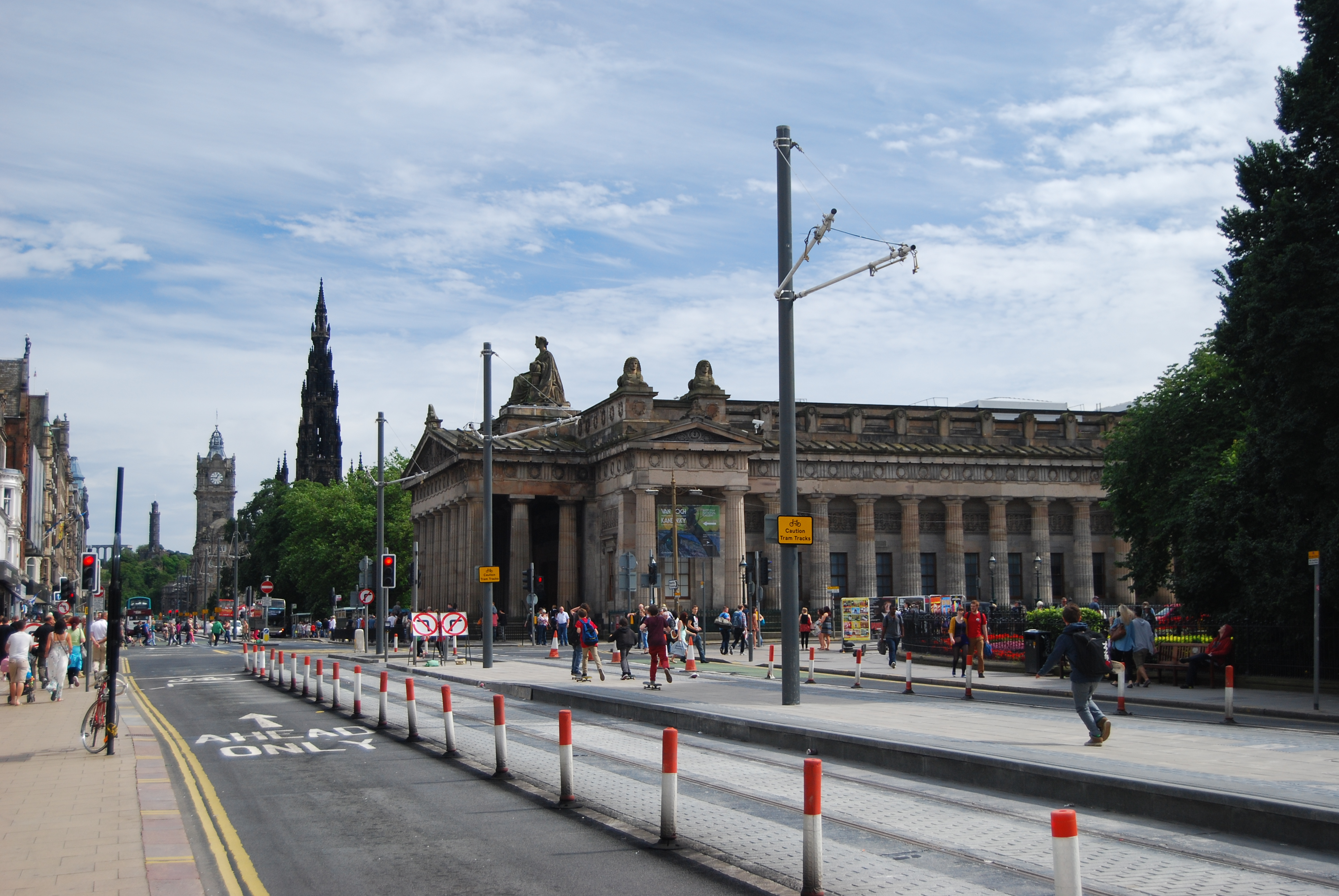
The same view in 2012

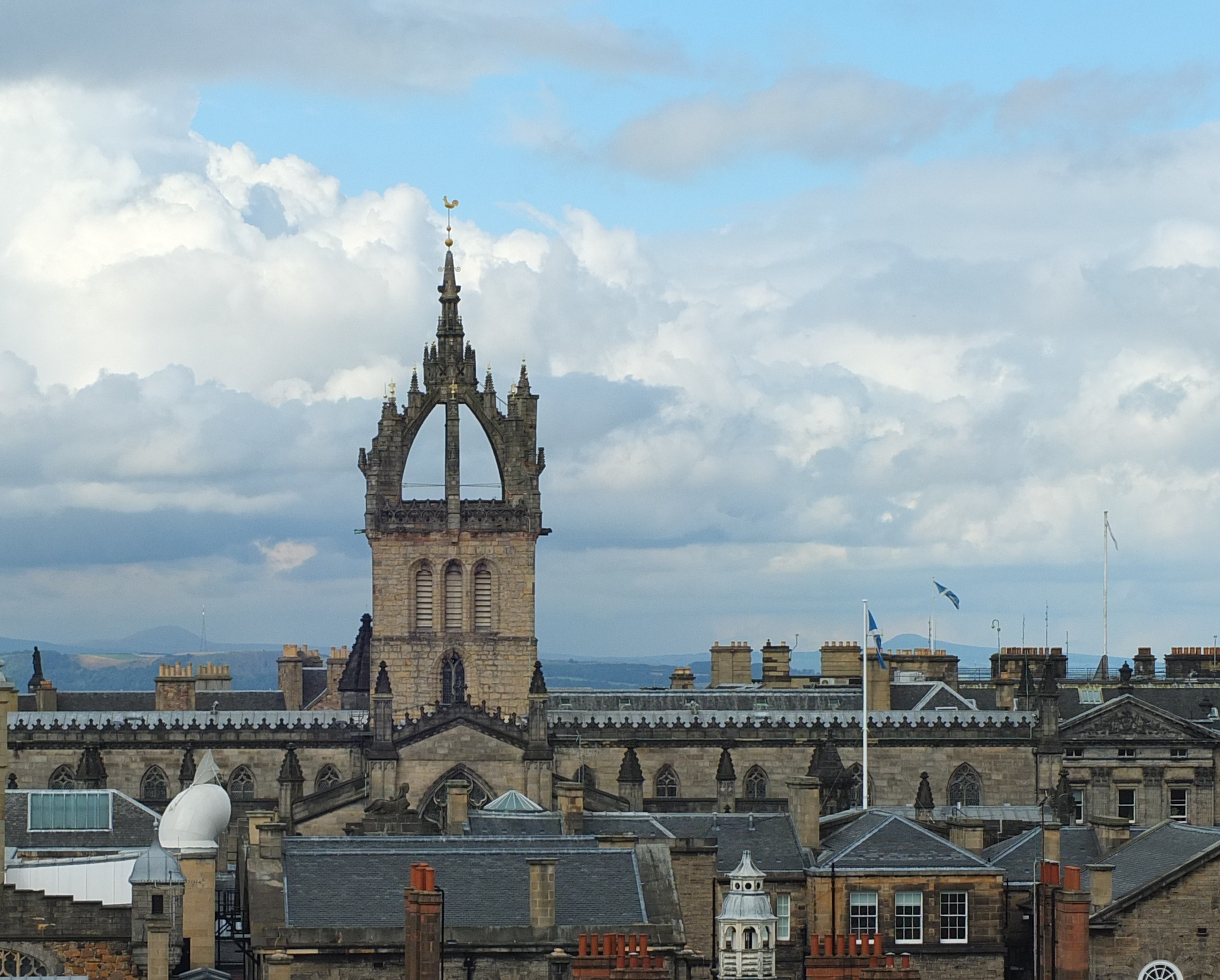
The spire of St Giles' Cathedral

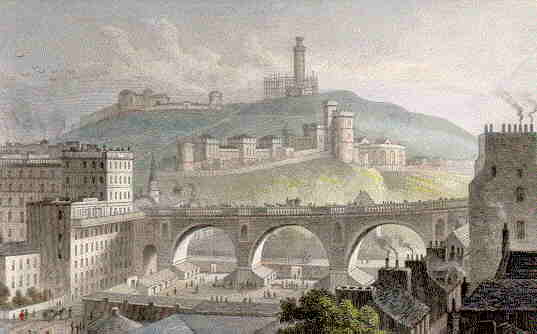
The original North Bridge

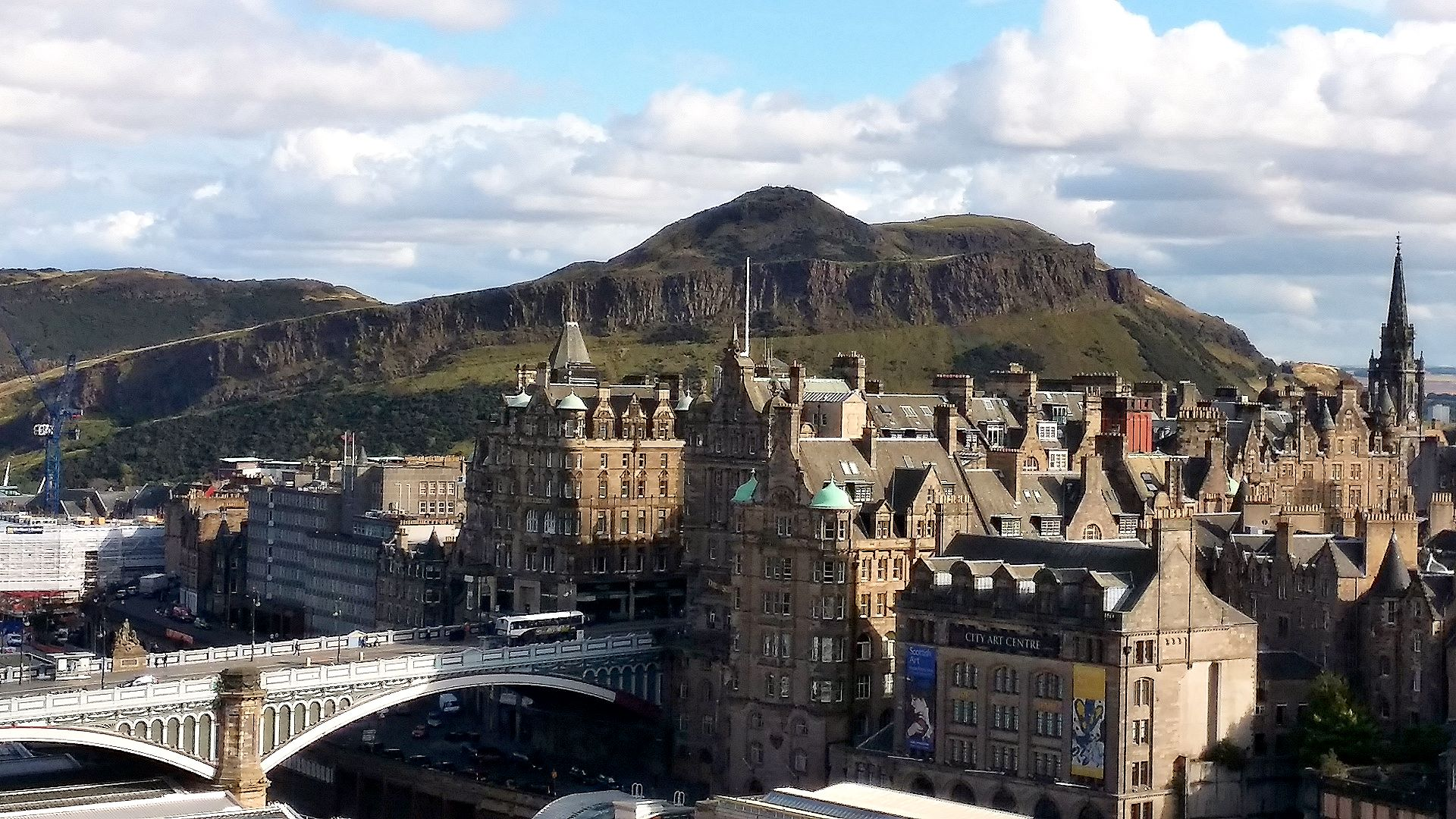
Arthur's Seat and Salisbury Crags

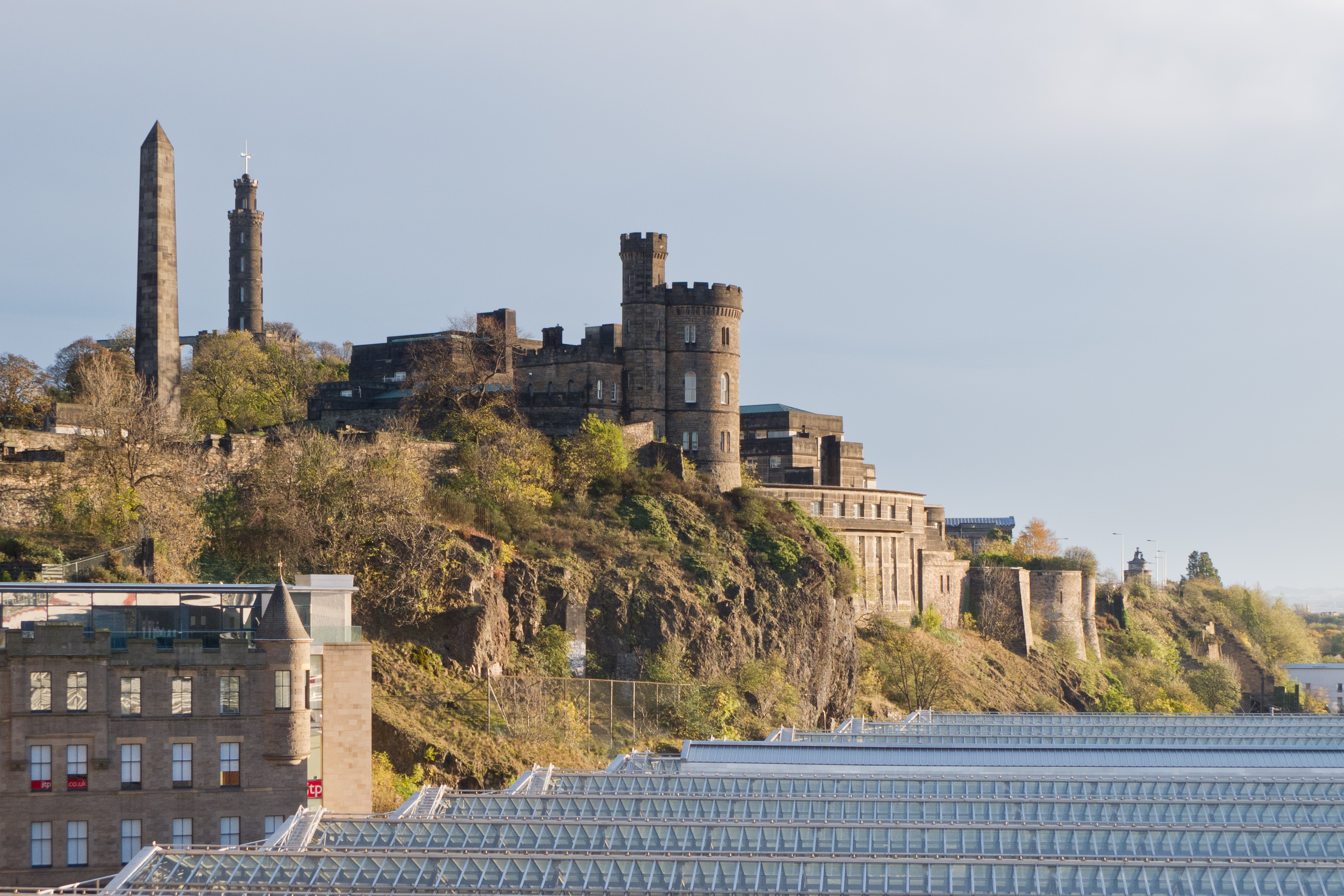
The Nelson Monument on Calton Hill

== Interpretation ==
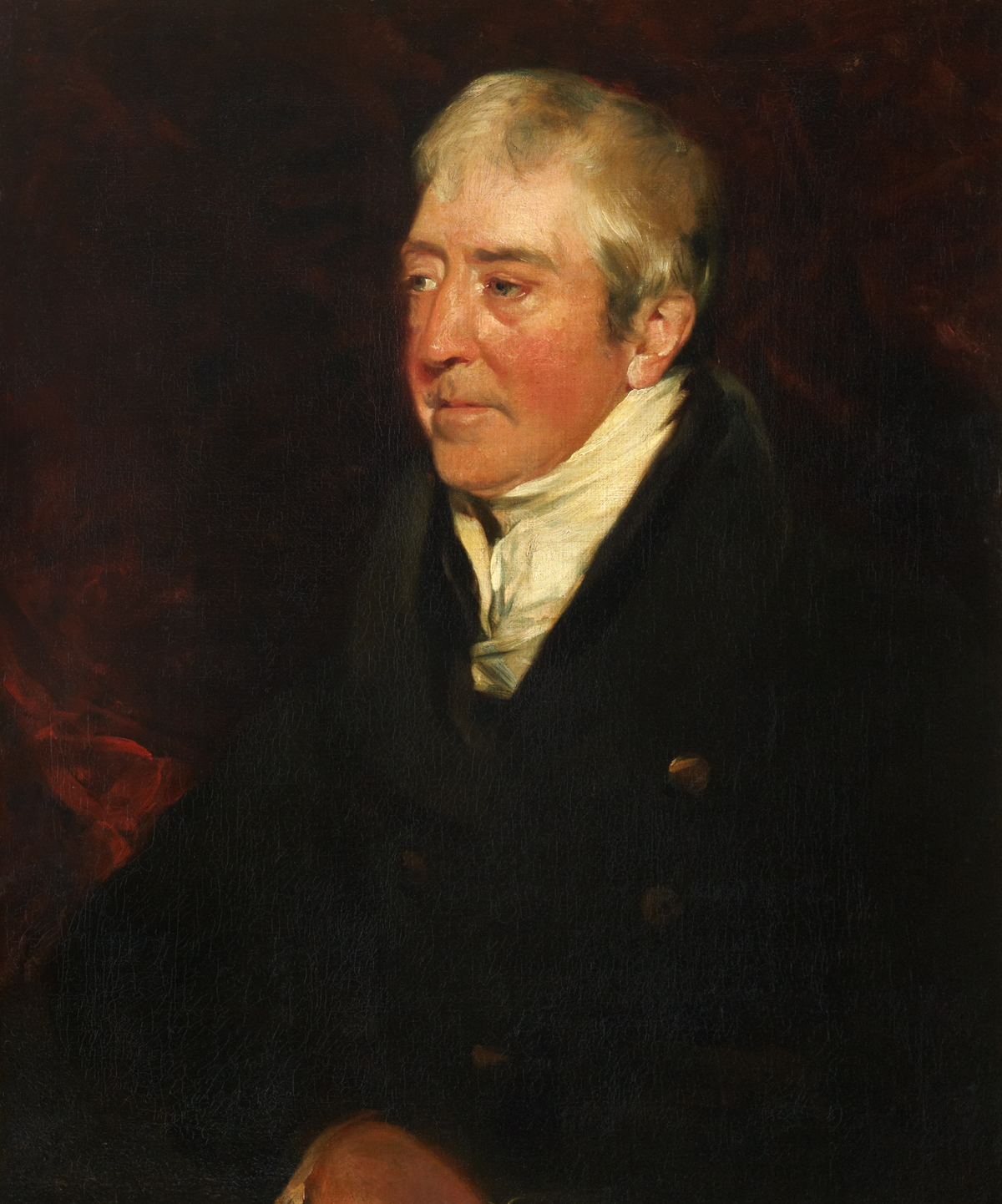
Portrait of Nasmyth by Andrew Geddes

Nasmyth’s painting has been interpreted in the context of his acquaintance with Scottish Enlightenment thinkers, notably John Playfair, John Leslie, James Hall and James Hutton. The group took a keen interest in examining the rock formations in Edinburgh and its environs. In particular, Hutton (later dubbed “the father of modern geology”) formed a theory of an ancient cycle of creation and destruction in landforms from his observations at Calton Hill, Arthur’s Seat and the Castle Rock. It has been understood that Nasmyth’s painting is designed to connect human progress with geological history. It is notable that the painting presents a partially imaginary scene – the viewpoint is around 5 metres in the air, not high enough to allow a clear view of Edinburgh’s rocky promontories. Nasmyth, it is suggested, has exaggerated the visibility of Arthur's Seat and Calton Hill to emphasise that "Scottish history is to be measured, not in centuries, but ages." Nasmyth – by profession an architect and town planner – juxtaposes a building with the Scottish landscape features celebrated by Hutton et al. By presenting the construction of the Royal Institution building against a geological backdrop, Nasmyth presents early 19th-century progress as a natural part of ancient geological time.

== Bibliography ==
- Allen, Aaron. Building Early Modern Edinburgh: A Social History of Craftwork and Incorporation. Edinburgh University Press, 2018.
- Betterton, J.; Craig, J.; Mendum, J. R.; Neller, R.; Tanner, J. (19 June 2019). Aspects of the Life and Works of Archibald Geikie. Geological Society of London. ISBN 978-1-78620-402-8.
- Macmillan, Duncan. Scottish Art, 1460-2000. Mainstream Publishing, 2000.
- Williams, Andrew Gibbon & Brown, Andrew. The Bigger Picture: A History of Scottish Art. BBC Books, 1993.
