= John Hutchison (sculptor) =

Scottish sculptor (1832–1910)

John Hutchison ARSA, RSA
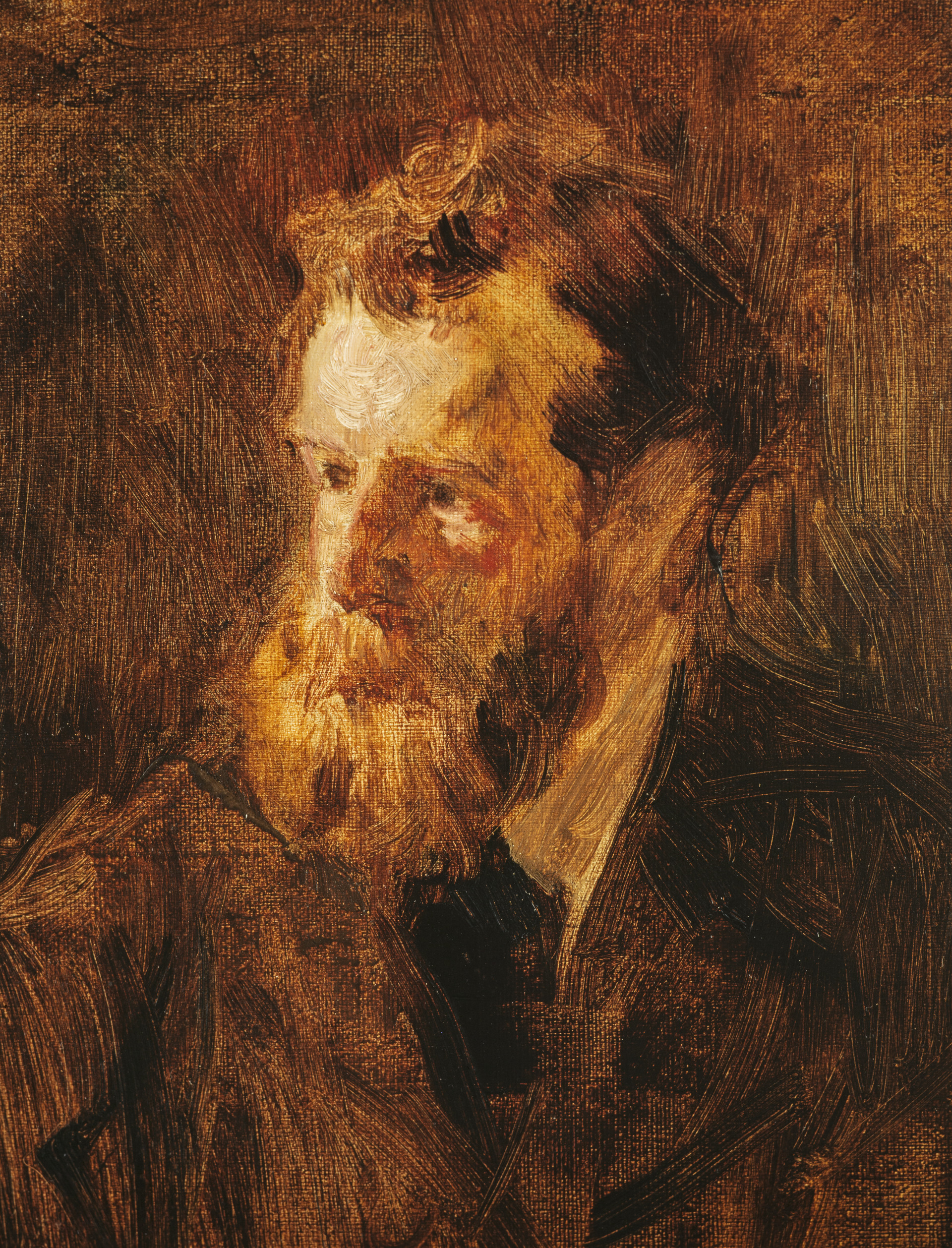
- John Hutchison by G.P. Chalmers
- Born: 1 June 1832; Lauriston, Edinburgh, United Kingdom
- Died: 23 May 1910 (aged 77); Edinburgh, United Kingdom
- Resting place: Grange Cemetery
- Education: Apprenticed to James Christie; Trustees Academy; Edinburgh School of Applied Art
- Known for: Bronze statuary and busts
- Notable work: Bust of Sir Walter Scott, Westminster Abbey; Statue of Adam Black, Princes Street Gardens
- Spouse: Margaret Ballantine (1839–1875)

John Hutchison (1 June 1832 – 23 May 1910) was a Scottish sculptor based in Edinburgh. He was the son of an unnamed builder, and his artistic life began as a thirteen-year-old woodcarving apprentice. He attended art school in the evenings, then later became a student at the Trustees Academy and attracted the patronage of its owner, Patrick Allan Fraser, who gave him commissions to fund his study in Rome. Although after Rome he continued to enjoy ancient Roman sculptural themes, he remained in Edinburgh for the rest of his life, working in wood, clay and marble, and concentrating on portraiture of Scottish people, and images of Scottish myth and history. He created the bust of Sir Walter Scott in Poets' Corner in Westminster Abbey. He was a successful artist who received commissions from Queen Victoria.

== Background ==
Hutchison's father was an Edinburgh builder. He was born in Laurieston, in north-west Edinburgh. In 1895 he was left £1,000 by James Cowan. He married Margaret Ballantine (1839–1875) on 28 June 1870 in Edinburgh. Margaret was the daughter of poet James Ballantine and Margaret Peat. Hutchison's daughter Henrietta (1871–1933) married Andrew Paterson Melville and became a Justice of the Peace. Hutchison retired in 1907 and spent much time reading. When his lifelong friend Orchardson died in April 1910, "it told very seriously upon him. He lost his old interest in life, and his strength under the blow gradually gave way." Hutchison died on 23 May 1910 in Edinburgh after a week's illness, and is buried in Grange Cemetery, in the northern half of its SE section, alongside his wife Margaret. In 1911 The Royal Scottish Academy received Hutchison's portrait by Sir William Quiller Orchardson, R.A., HRSA., as a bequest from Hutchison. This portrait was originally done in exchange for a sculpted head of Orchardson by Hutchison.

== Career ==
=== Training ===
Hutchison lived, worked and died in Edinburgh. However his apprenticeship from age thirteen as a wood carver was served in a workshop on the top floor of a tenement (since demolished) on Edinburgh High Street near John Knox's Corner. This involved work on the estate at Hospitalfield Trust, Arbroath 1849 to 1853 under the sculptor James Christie. At Hospitalfield he had the patronage of architect Patrick Allan Fraser who gave him commissions to fund his studies in Rome. Hutchison later became one of the Trustees of the Hospitalfield Trust. As an apprentice he also took evening classes in decorative relief and modelling, before studying in the Antique and Life department under Robert Scott Lauder at the Trustees Academy, Edinburgh, from 1848. He joined its Sketching Club, and studied alongside George Paul Chalmers, John MacWhirter and William Quiller Orchardson. In 1859–1860 and 1863 he studied in Rome under Alfred Gatty. He associated there with artists Pietro Tenerani, Giovanni Dupré, Hiram Powers, John Gibson, and Lawrence Macdonald. He was a student at the Edinburgh School of Applied Art 1894–95, when already an established sculptor. His skills were in marble, wood and bronze.

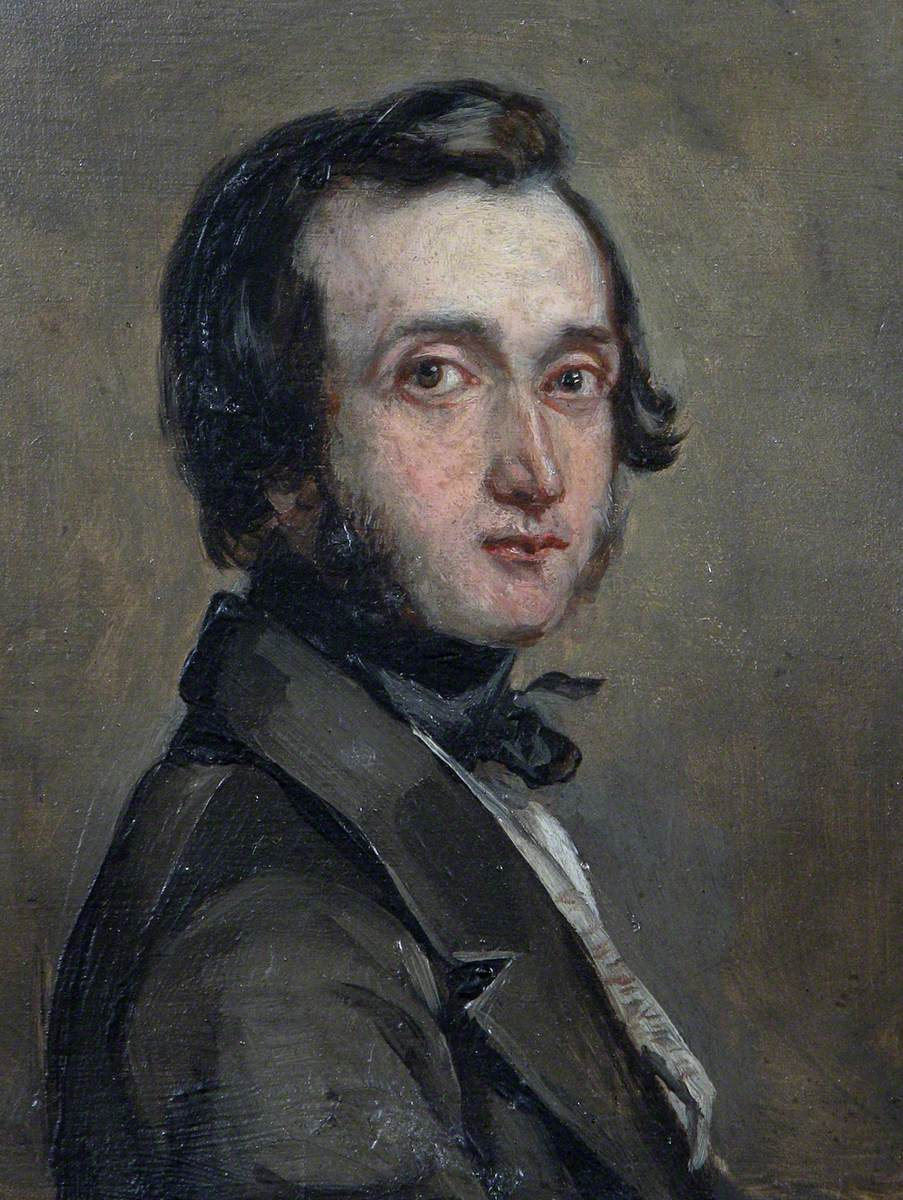
Fraser the patron ...

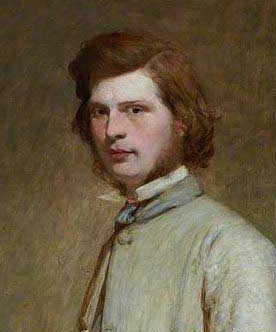
... and Hutchison the student

=== Working life ===
Hutchison's sculpture yard stood at 3 Torphicen Place in Edinburgh's West End, and he lived with his family in a large Victorian flat at 19 Manor Place, slightly to the north of his studio. He exhibited in the Royal Scottish Academy (RSA) from 1856 to 1902, and became an associate of the RSA in 1862, and a member in 1867. He acted as Librarian to the RSA from 1877 to 1886, and one of his early tasks was to arrange and classify the collection of prints bequeathed by David Laing. He was Honorary Treasurer from 1886 to 1907. On his retirement, he was presented with a silver hot-water jug and a Georgian silver salver in respect of their esteem, and his "long and devoted interest" in the academy. He first exhibited at the Royal Academy in 1862. Hutchison was involved in an early usage of tintype photographs in the Courts, used to prove the death of the late Earl of Aberdeen and to allow for his brother to succeed the title. The petitioner Campbell Gordon wished to prove that his brother, Earl George Gordon, had travelled to America and enrolled as mate on the ship Hera under the name of George H. Osborne, then drowned at sea. Photographs of George taken in Scotland, and in America under his new name, were to be compared by artists as expert witnesses, and Hutchison was asked to be one of these. The Times said that he specialised in figures from "Scottish history and romance" and memorials of Scottish priests. By 1908, Hutchison has retired from the Royal Scottish Academy's exhibition "active list", implying that he had retired from creating public works.

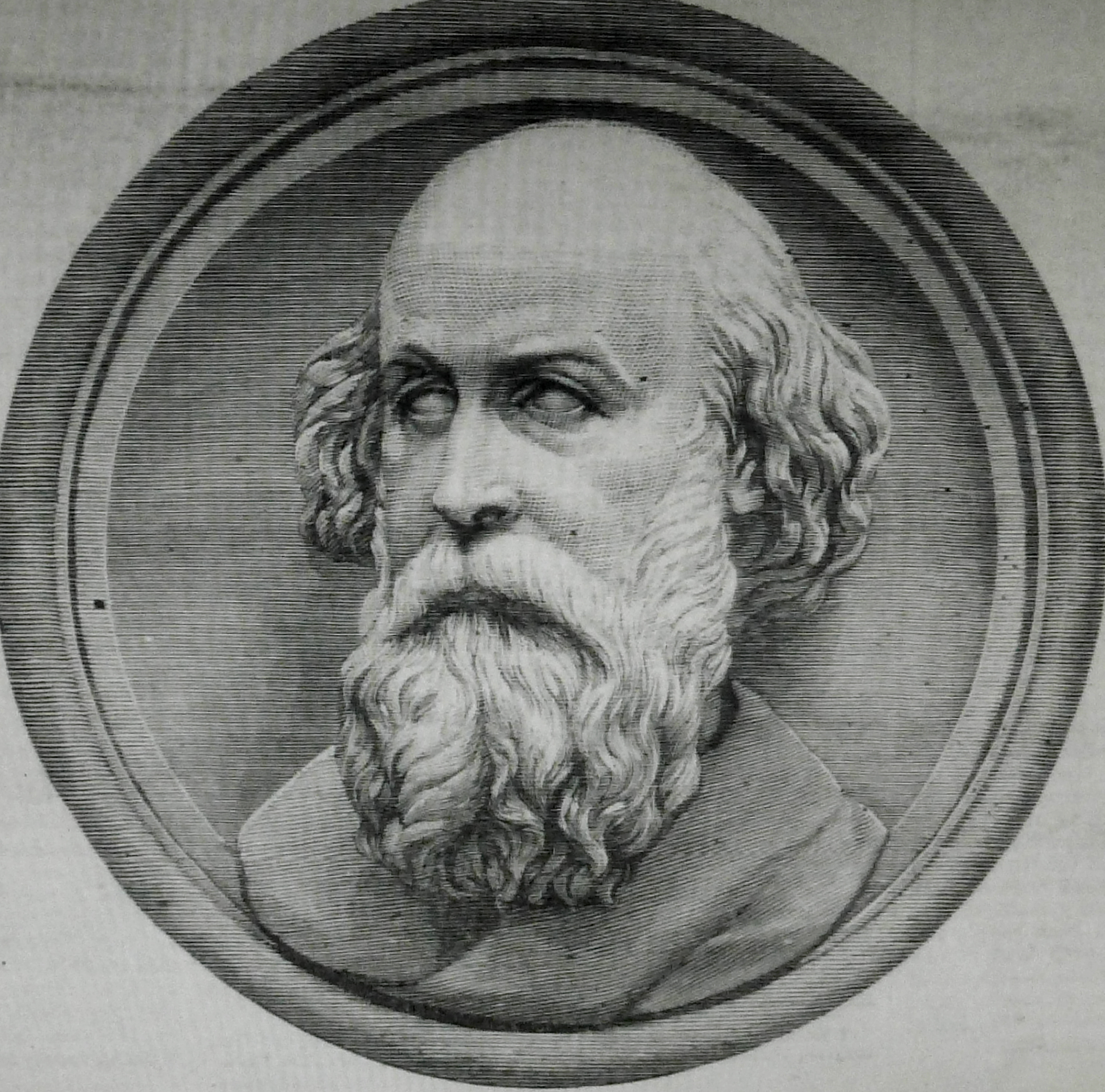
Robert Scott Lauder (1872)

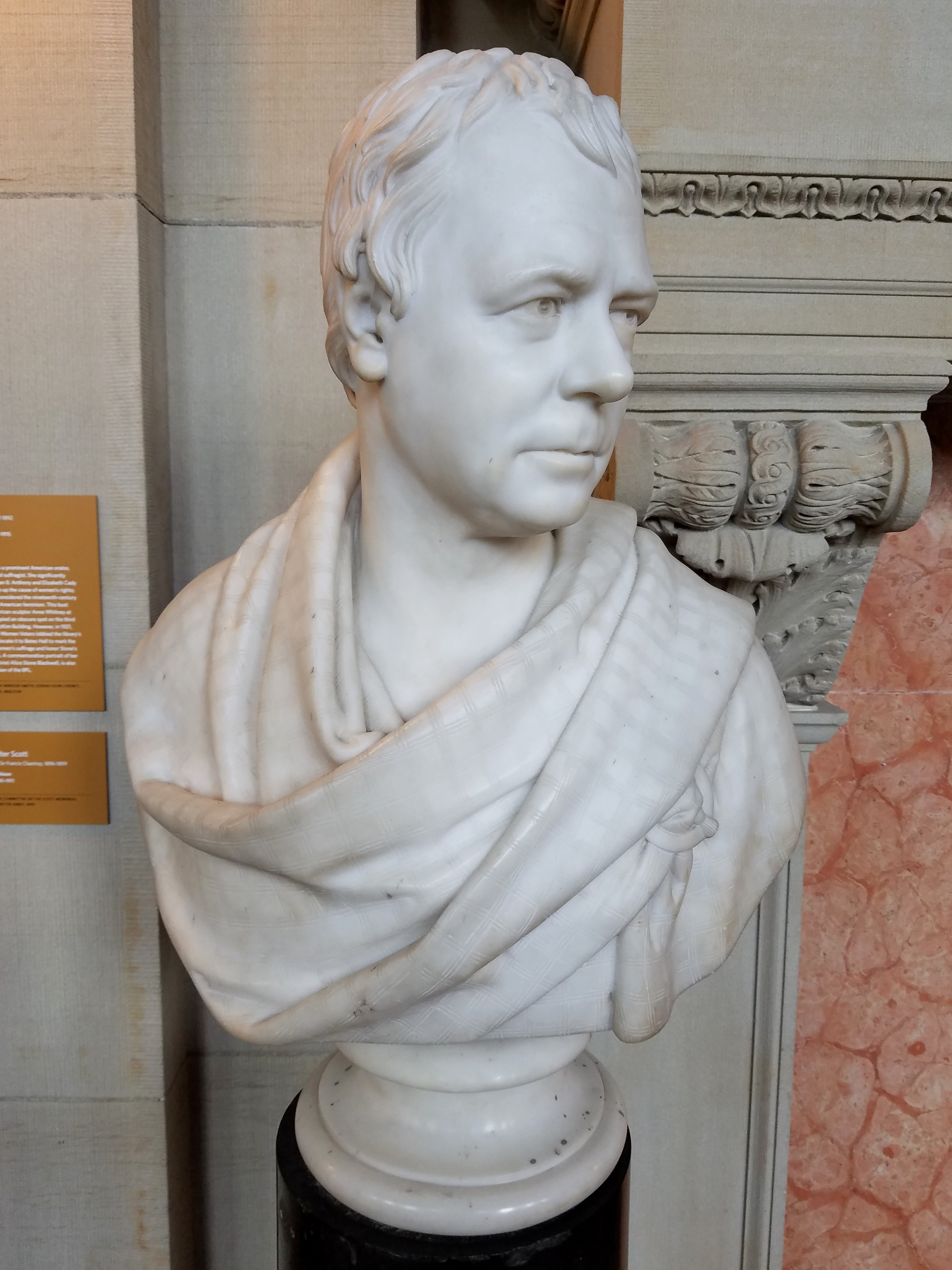
Walter Scott (1899) in Boston Central Library

== Works ==
=== Early work ===
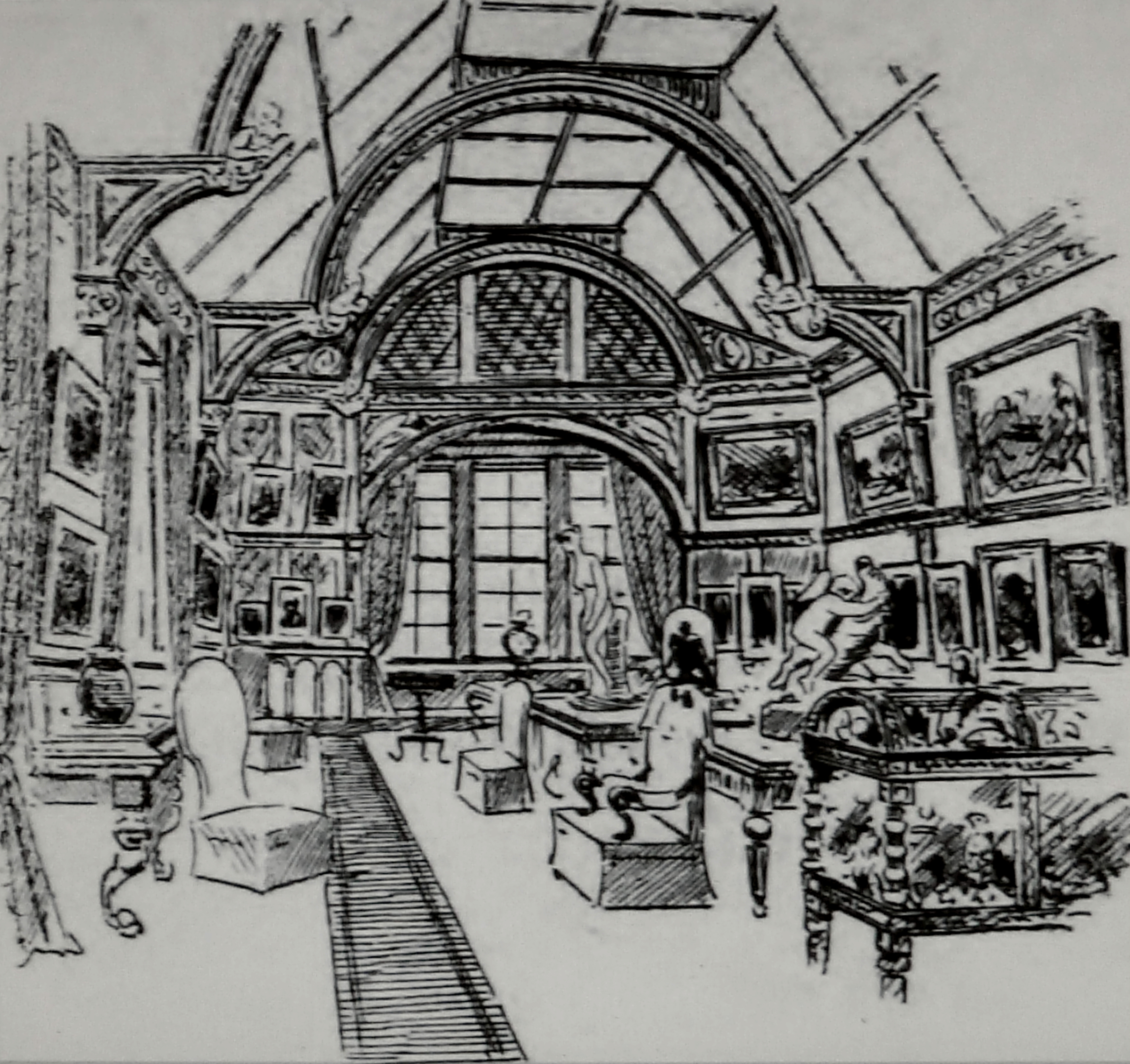
Picture gallery, Hospitalfield House

Hutchison's first public work was executed in 1852, when he was twenty years old, for Patrick Allan Fraser HRSA. He "executed the woodcarvings and other decorations in relief for the picture gallery then in course of erection in Hospitalfield." The architect Fraser spent some years on this build, which provided much work for artisans. His other 1850s works included: Portrait Medallion (1856), his first of many entries in the Scottish Royal Academy's exhibitions. The next to be exhibited was the József Katona character Melinda (1857), then Bust of a Gentleman (1858), Bust of J.B. Macdonald, Esq. (1859), (Note: John Blake MacDonald RSA was a fellow pupil of Robert Scott Lauder. His biography is here) the Coleridge character Genevieve (1859) and the "colossal bust" of Harald Hardrada (1859) for Lord Dufferin's Clandeboye Estate.

=== After studying in Rome ===
By 1860, Hutchison had trained in Rome, and in October of that year was appointed teacher of ornamental modelling at the Watt Institution and School of Arts. He concentrated on portraits and busts, some with ancient Roman themes. He exhibited a Bust of Lawrence Macdonald Esq., HRSA, Sculptor (1860), and of Robert Scott Lauder RSA (1859), (Note: He exhibited a model for the Lauder bust in 1860, then the marble bust itself in 1862) both now in the Scottish National Portrait Gallery. In the same year he produced portraits of Dr Farquharson father of Joseph Farquharson, his friend John Phillip, Esq., RA, HRSA, and The late Sir George Harvey, PRSA. in 1861 he executed Rome and A Roman Girl. Then Biggs Andrew, Esq., QC and Don Quixote were exhibited in 1862, followed by Mrs Learmonth in 1863. (Note: Mrs Learmonth is probably Margaret Alexandra Cleghorn (1799–1831) daughter of Dr James Cleghorn of Dublin, wife of John Learmonth.) He showed Fanny, Daughter of Thomas Faed, Esq., ARA, HRSA and Bonnye Kilmeny in 1864. (Note: Bonnie Kilmeny is a character in the poem Kilmeny by James Hogg.) Stella, a Roman Mother and Angelino, a Shepherd appeared in 1865. In 1866 he exhibited Mrs Richardson, and A Roman Dancing Girl.

Another 1866 work by Hutchison was Adam Black, Esq., a marble bust and precursor to the later bronze. The Scotsman was "delighted to observed the excellence of the likeness generally, and the success with which the sculptor has conveyed the mingled expression of firmness and sagacity so characteristic of the original." The Dundee Courier declared that "the composition, plain and unsophisticated, devoid of all ornament, is in harmony with and fitly symbolises the life-long character of the original." 1867 saw the appearance of James Ballantine, part of the Ballantine Testimonial, and also A Lady, and Bust of a Lady. In 1868 he executed James Cox, Esq., Lochee and J. Whyte-Melville Esq., Bennochy, past Grand Master-Mason of Scotland. His Dante was exhibited in 1869.

Hutchison's Pasquccia, A Roman Contadina (1870), is in the Scottish National Portrait Gallery. Greyfriars Kirk has his Angel of the Resurrection (1870) as part of the Robert Lee memorial, and Warriston Cemetery has his Monument to Robert Scott Lauder (1870). His Tablet to Dr William Glover (1871) is at Greenside Church, Royal Terrace, and his Monument to David Allan (1874) is in Old Calton Burial Ground. He recarved the defaced portrait on the monument to William Carstares (d.1727) at Greyfriars Kirkyard in 1876. During this decade he created two monumental statues: Adam Black (1877) in Princes Street Gardens and Robert the Bruce (1879) which is on Lochmaben High Street, Dumfries and Galloway; his birthplace. The latter shows Bruce holding court at the 1320 Great Convention of Estates, at Arbroath.

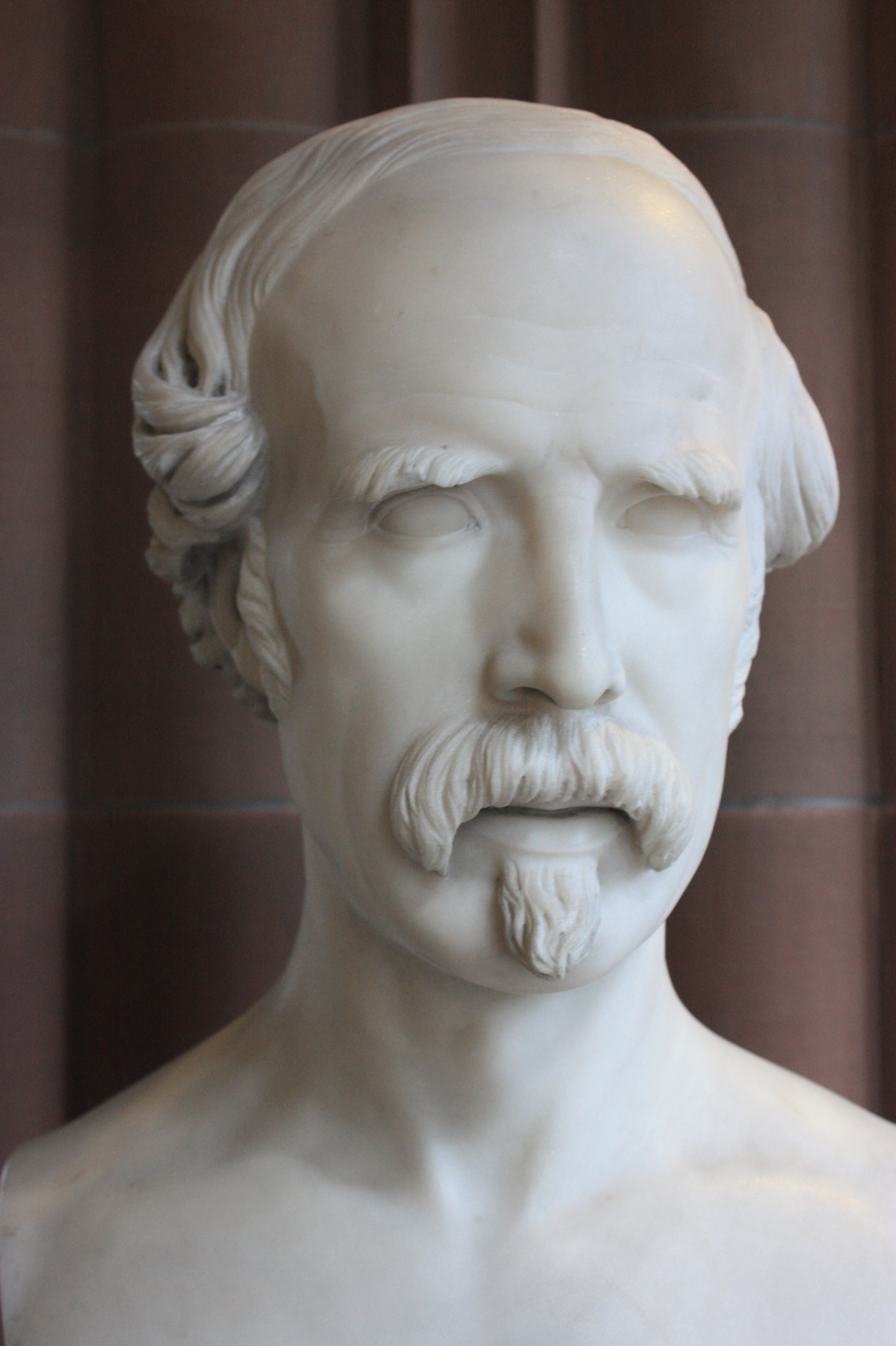
Lawrence Macdonald (1860)

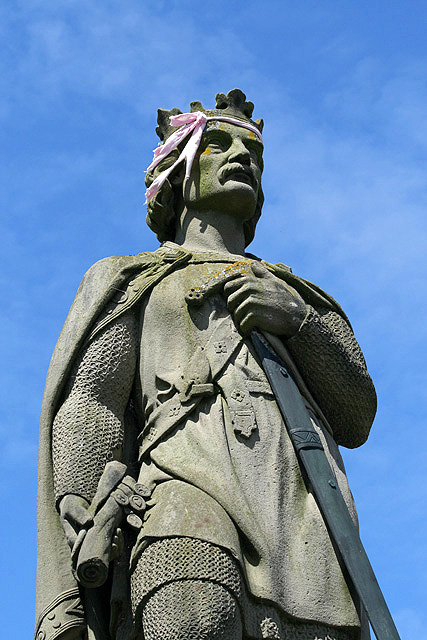
Robert the Bruce (1879)

=== Increasing reputation ===
Hutchison's increasing reputation is reflected in the number of larger commissions he received in the 1870s. They include statues, monuments and a bronze door. He began with Coll Macdonald Macdonald (1870), and James Falshaw, Esq., Forfar (1871). There was more work available in 1873, with The Earl of Dalhousie, KT, GCB, The late Archibald Watson Goldie, Esq., WS, Nina, a Roman study, Peter Reid, Esq., Forfar, Mrs Lockhart Thomson, The late Sir James Y. Simpson, Bt, MD etc., Emmie, Mrs James Ballantine, and The late William Glover, DD.

In 1874 Hutchison produced The Glee Maiden from the Fair Maid of Perth, Katie, daughter of John MacLaren, Esq., Advocate, Sheriff in Chancery, and James Salmon, Esq., Architect, Glasgow, while still perhaps preparing for the 1877 bronze, with The late Adam Black, Esq. 1875 may have been taken up with this bronze, because he only exhibited Reverend Alexander Duff, DD, LLD in that year and in 1876 he had little time for anything else. In 1877 he was free to execute The late George Dalziel, Esq., John Clerk Brodie, Esq., and the 17-foot centennial monument to James Carmichael, engineer & inventor of the fan blast, unveiled in Albert Square, Dundee on 17 June. Carmichael sits reading a plan, with his inventions pictured on the plinth. In the same year he made the Design for an alter-tomb now being erected in marble, and a Bronze Door of Mausoleum, perspective view. In 1878 he again exhibited a version of The late Adam Black; also Duncan McLaren, Esq., MP, and A Young Lady. In 1879 he showed A Portrait, Henry Simpson Esq., Rev. George R. Davidson, DD, and The late William Jenkyns, MA, killed in defence of the British Residency, Cabul.

In the 1880s there were busts and memorials. Hutchison executed the Marble Monument to George Paul Chalmers in Dean Cemetery in 1880. In 1882 he contributed three or four stone figures to the Scott Monument on Princes Street including Baron Bradwardine, The Glee Maiden and Flora MacIvor, plus "eight heads in relief for the relic room." (Note: The Scott Monument has a first-floor chamber designed as a relic room; it is now a museum) Four busts followed this: Sir James Falshaw (1871) exhibited again, Lord Provost of Edinburgh (1882), Charles Wyville Thomson (1883), in the Playfair Library, Edinburgh University, William Robertson (1883) at Greyfriars Kirk and William Lindsay Alexander (1885) in Augustine Congregational Church, George IV Bridge. In 1887 he made the gilded Figure of Youth. There followed a Bust of Sir Douglas Maclagan (1887), now in the Playfair Library, Edinburgh University, and the Head of Sir John Clerk Brodie (1888) for his grave in Dean Cemetery. The 1880s was a very busy year. In 1880 he produced Marietta, a Roman girl, The late George Paul Chalmers, RSA, Bust of a Gentleman, The Late Adam Black, Lord Provost & MP for Edinburgh, Katie, Stella, Pasquccia, study from life at Rome, The late D. O. Hill, RSA after Patric Park, The Late Dr Robert Lee, and the Roman Dancing Girl Reposing.

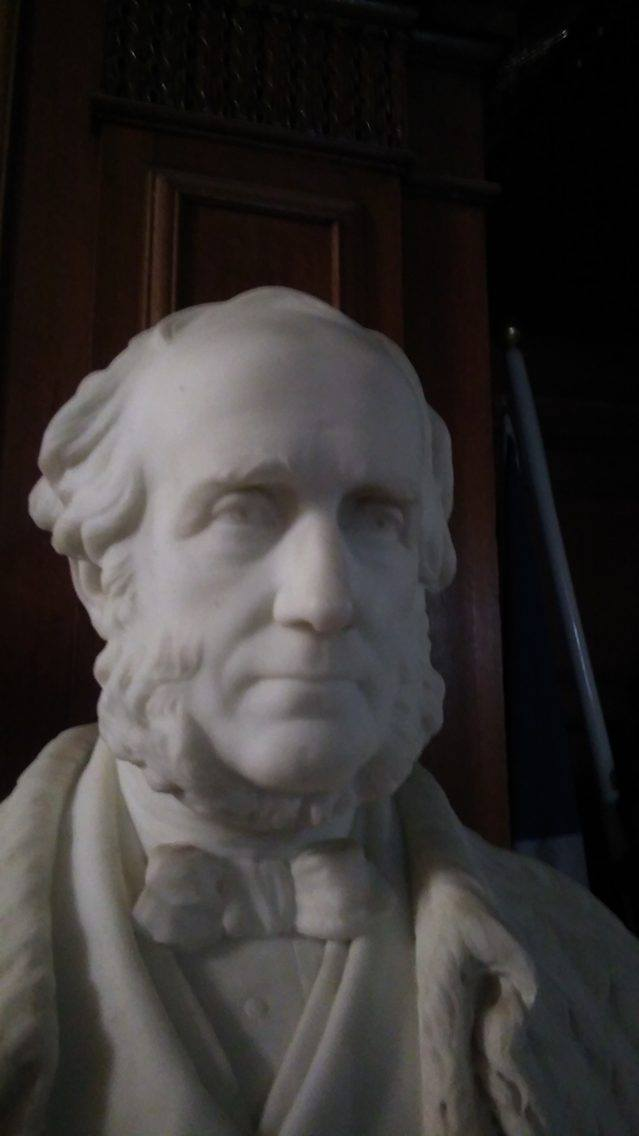
Duncan McLaren (1878)

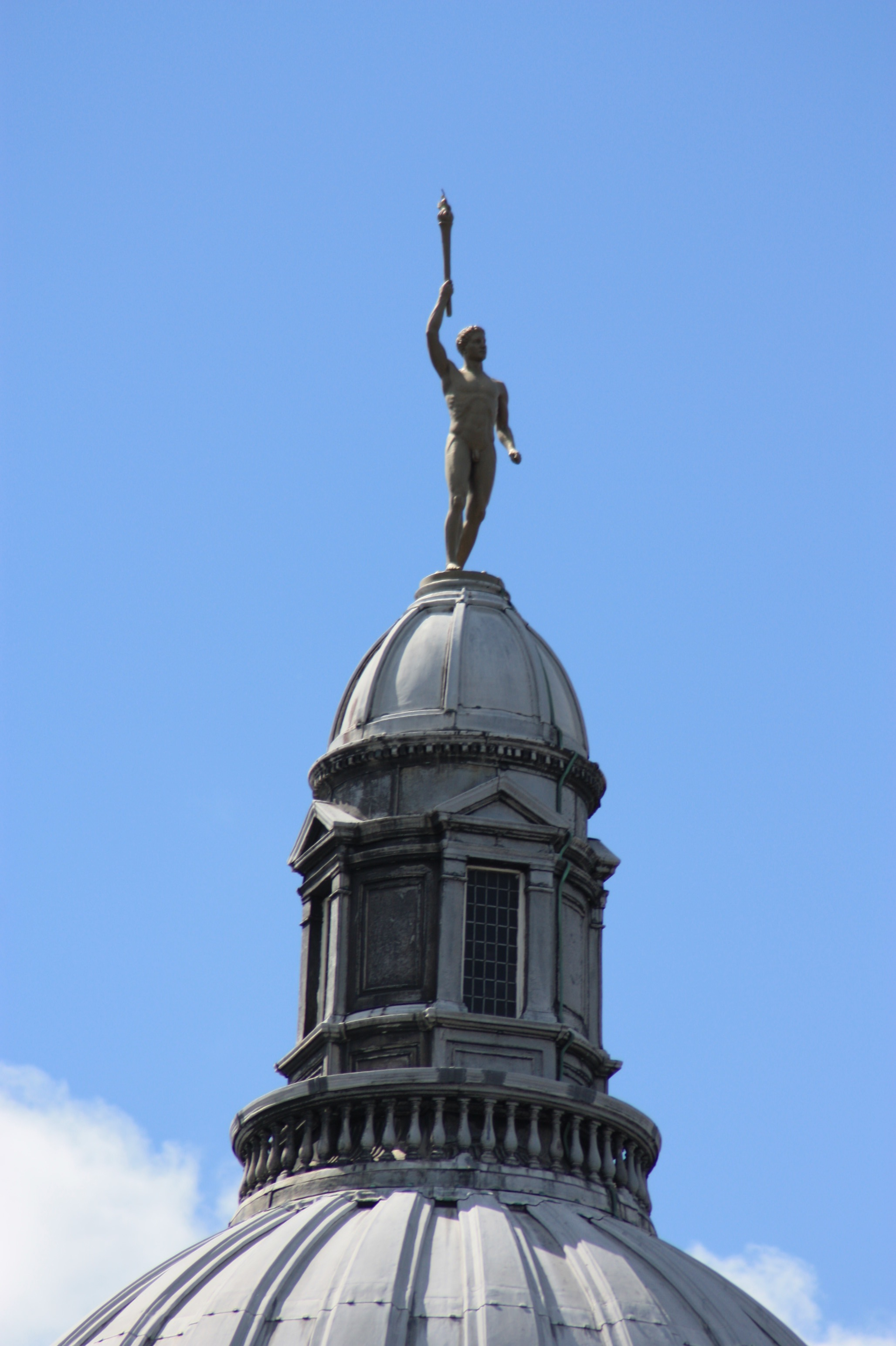
Figure of Youth (1887)

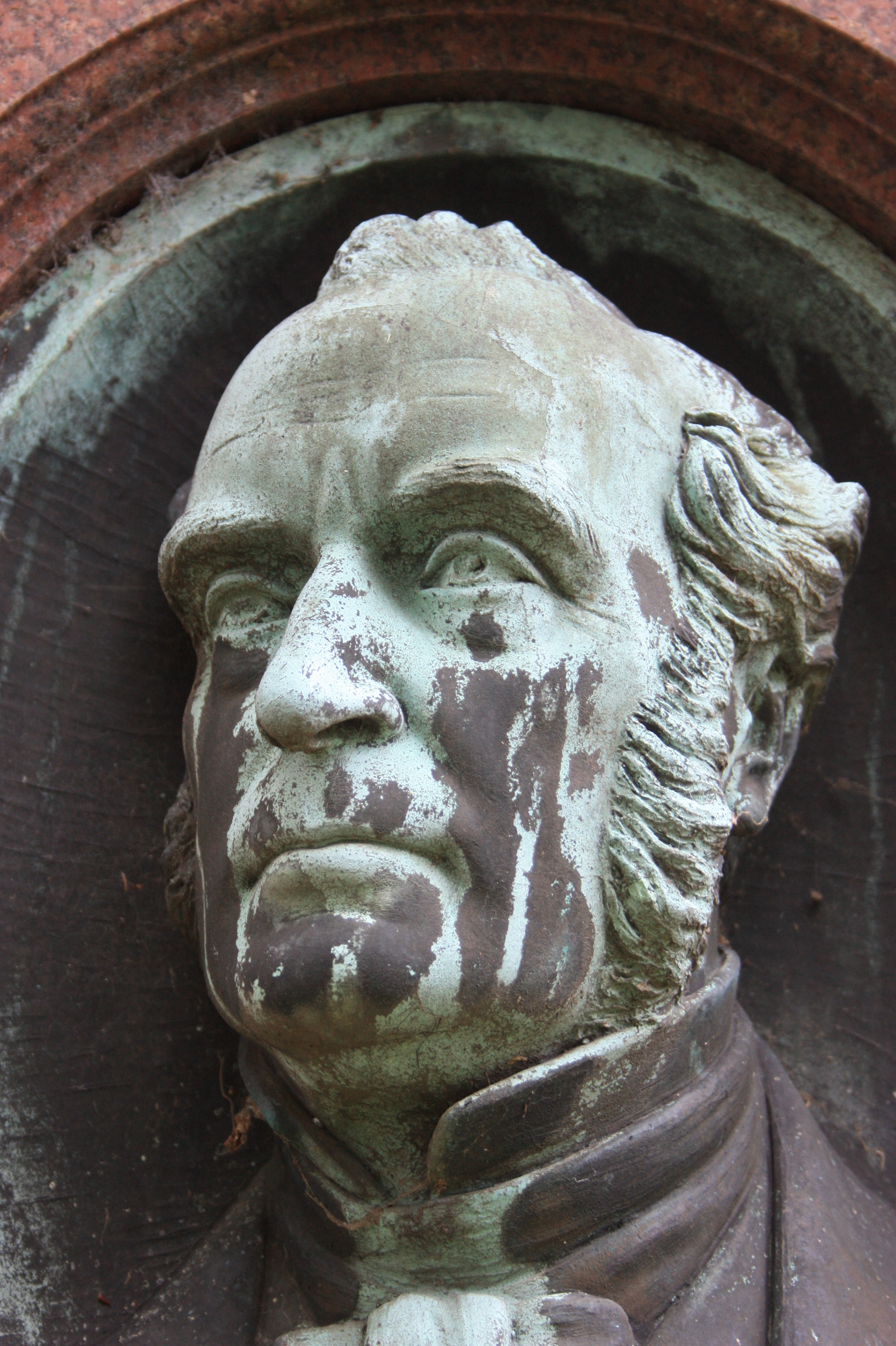
Memorial to John Clerk Brodie at Dean Cemetery, Edinburgh

=== Queen Victoria's commissions and public recognition ===
In 1881, Hutchison exhibited King Robert the Bruce, and in 1882 The Late William Rutherford Sanders, Professor of Pathology, Edinburgh University. In 1883 he showed Bust of a Gentleman, The Late Rt Hon. Lady Moncrieff, The Reverend Robert Herbert Story, DD, Rosneath, and Lord McLaren. Sir J. Noel Paton, RSA and Her Majesty's Limner for Scotland were produced in 1884, along with R. Roy Paterson, Esq., The Late Sir Charles Wyville Thomson, The Late J. A. Lake Gloag, Esq., and The Late Rt Hon. Fox Maule, Earl of Dalhousie etc. in Dundee chamber of commerce. In 1885 he created The Late Sir Henry Wellwood Moncrieff, Bart, DD. in 1886 he executed The Late Arthur Perigal, RSA, Il Condottiere, A study from life at Rome, William McEwan, Esq., and The Late Dr Lindsay Alexander. In 1887 he produced Dante in bronze, Professor Sir Douglas Maclagan, MD, President of the Royal College of Physicians of Edinburgh, The Late John Baxter, Esq., Edinburgh, and The Late Very Rev. Principal Tulloch, DD, LLD, the Queen's chaplain and Dean of the Order of the Thistle (made for the Queen and now in Windsor Castle).

By 1888 Hutchison could be said to have arrived, because after showing Bust of a Lady and Sir Charles U. Aitchison, KCSI, late Lieut-Governor of the Punjab, he produced The Late Dr Rev. Norman McLeod, LLD, etc., the Queen's chaplain and another one of several works commissioned by Queen Victoria and now in Windsor Castle. In 1887 he completed a bust of Her Majesty the Queen and of her consort Prince Albert, presented to the Victoria Art Galleries, Dundee by ex-Provost Ballingall, in the Queen's Golden Jubilee year. In 1889 he was commissioned by the Queen to create a memorial to the Royal Stewarts in Paisley Abbey: "a recumbent sculptured cross of Peterhead granite, on which will rest a Gothic cross of Sicilian marble." It was to be installed in September 1889. The same year, he exhibited A Torch Racer which had been the model for the 1887 Figure of Youth.

In the 1890s Hutchison's commissions were reflecting public recognition. In 1893 he carved figures on the Scottish National Portrait Gallery, including John Knox on the west side of the building. The bronze statue of John Knox (1895) in the central quadrangle of New College is his. The Dundee Advertiser said: "This sculptor had a great wish to execute a statue of Knox, and for two years previously had worked at it as a relief from more pressing work." The sculptor unveiled it himself in front of a large crowd on 21 May. His marble Bust of Sir Walter Scott (1897) in Poets' Corner in Westminster Abbey is an homage to that of Sir Francis Chantrey in Abbotsford House. This bust was commissioned and funded by The Edinburgh Sir Walter Scott Club.

By 1890 Hutchison was 68 years old, and producing as much as ever. That year, he exhibited The late Dr Andrew Combe, The late Hon. Lord Fraser, The late John Grigor, MD, Nairn, and the head of Dante in marble. At the RSA Exhibition in 1890 his Grigor was the most conspicuous piece: "an entirely realistic figure in bronze, with pilot-jacket overcoat, with wide-awake hat, as in life." 1891 brought Bust of a Lady, William Tod, Esq., and The Late William Wright, LLD, Professor of Arabic, Cambridge University. In 1892 he produced Henry Irving in the role of Hamlet, (Note: The bust of Henry Irving as Hamlet can be seen here and here) Baillie Harris and Miss Harris in the High School of Dundee, Sir Douglas Maclagan, MD, etc., and Study of a Girl's Head. 1893 brought more memorials, besides portraits to be presented with testaments. These were The Late J. F. MacLennan, LLD, Advocate, La Penserosa in reference to a poem by Louise Colet, The Late Mrs Barbour of Bonskied, The Late Alexander Kilgour, MD, Aberdeen, and Bust of a lady. The private commissions continued throughout 1894, with James Carmichael, Engineer, Dundee, (Note: An image of the James Carmichael bust can be seen here) Miss Ethel Campbell Smith, Bust of a Lady and The Regent Murray. His life must have become more interesting in 1895, because some projects had scope for invention: Agriculture, Engineering, and Study for a Head of a Colossal Statue. Perhaps now he could afford not to accept so many private commissions by 1896. In that year he made or exhibited The late Charles Jenner, Esq., and Pasquccia, Roman study, and Study of a Girl's Head. In 1897 he showed William McEwan, Esq., MP, George Buchanan, humanist and reformer, and The late Charles U. Aitchison, KCSI, Lieut-Governor of the Punjab, for the Aitchison College, Lahore. In 1898 he created Dante, Ravenna. His portrait of Professor George James Allman is undated, but Allman died in 1898.

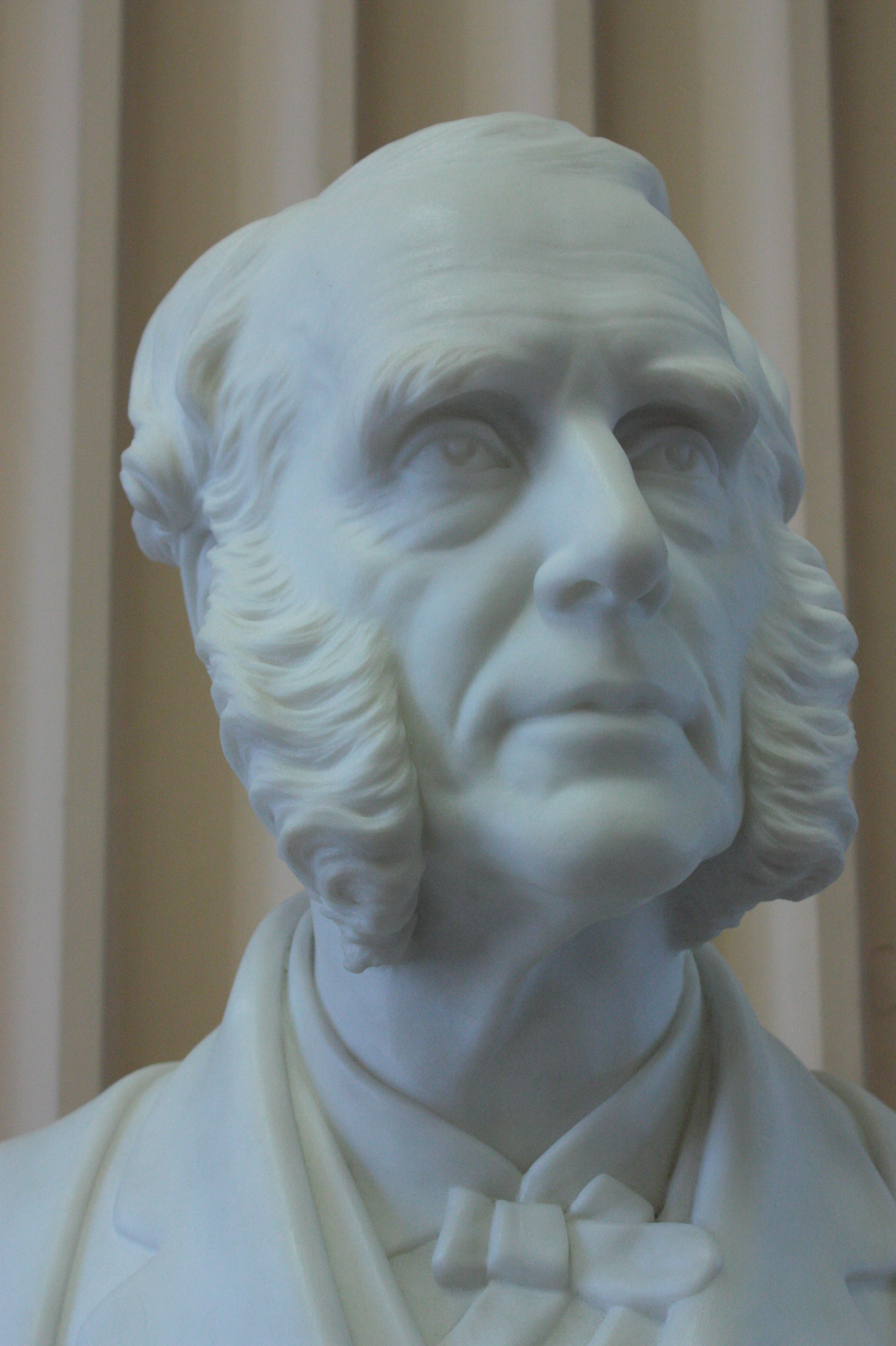
Douglas Maclagan (1887)

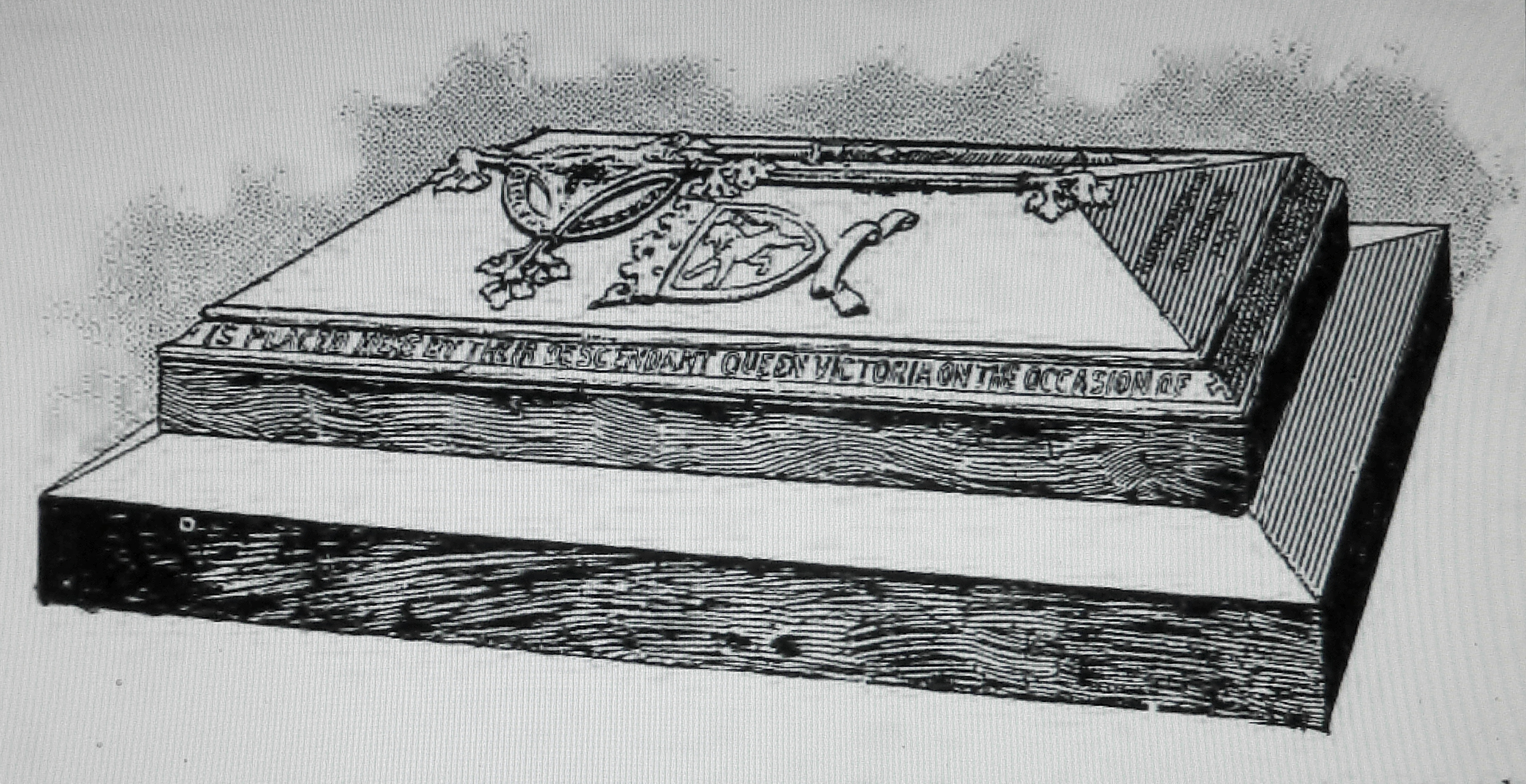
Royal Stewarts memorial (1889) at Paisley Abbey

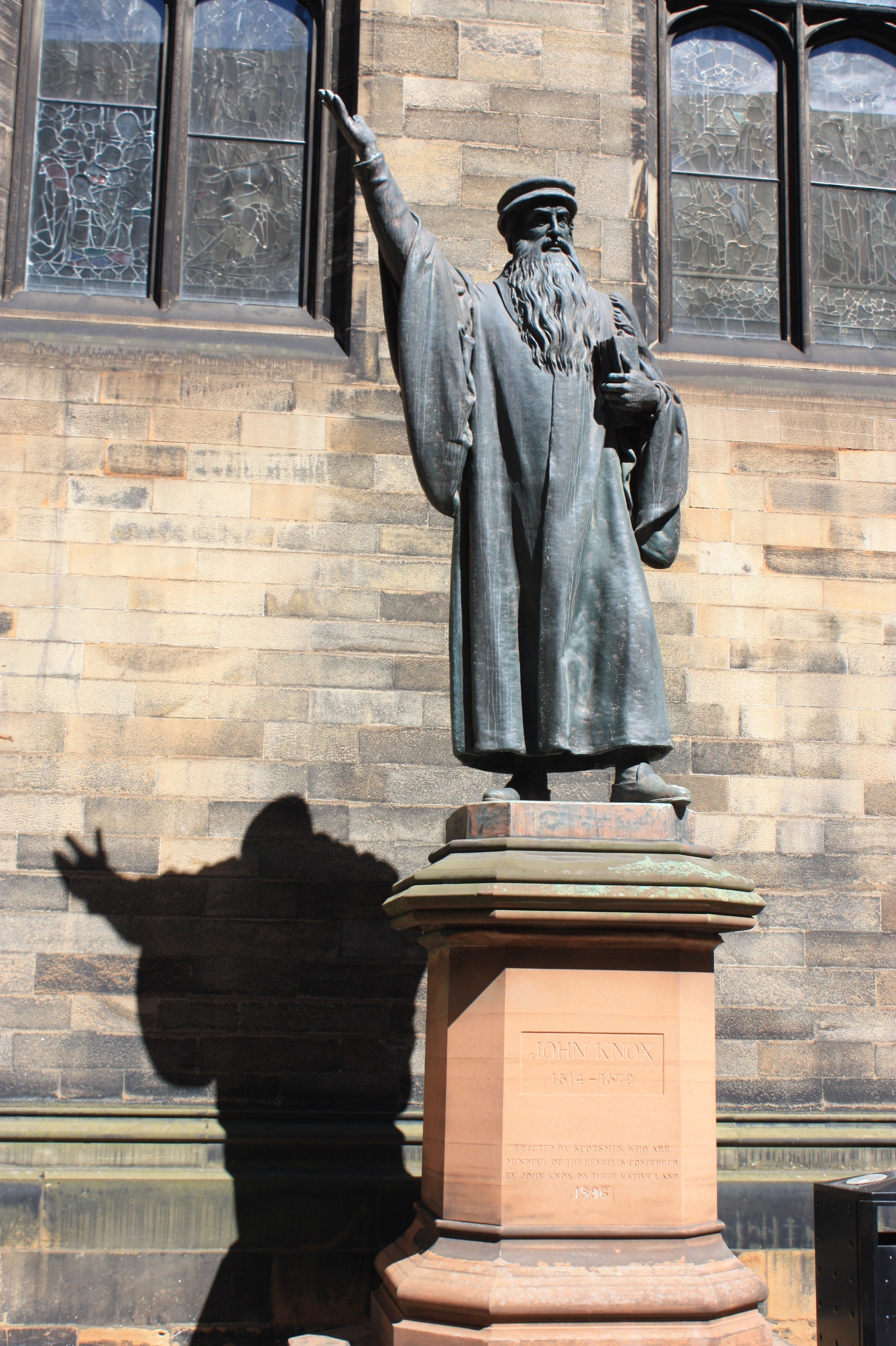
John Knox (1895), New College Edinburgh

=== Last years ===
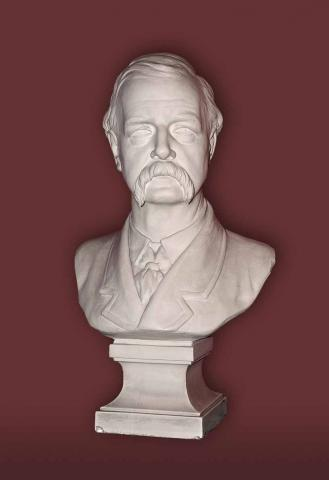
John Batty Tuke (1905)

In his last decade, Hutchison exhibited only until 1905, and to begin with in 1900 he only showed one work: The late Professor William Rutherford, MD, FRS, Professor of Physiology, Edinburgh University. In 1901 he showed three works from previous years: Pasquecia, Her late Majesty the Queen, and Il Condottiere, besides new works including The Good Shepherd, Rev. David Macrae, Aeneas J. G. Mackay, Esq., KC, Sheriff of Fife & Kinross and Henrietta. In 1902 he again showed Bust of lady and Study of a Roman Girl, along with the new work James Grahame, Marquis of Montrose. In 1903 he produced Thomas Aird, and A Florentine. In 1905 he showed his last exhibited work, Sir John Batty Tuke, MD, MP.

== Anecdotes from his career ==
=== Adam Black statue incident ===
Hutchison was contracted to have his Adam Black statue completed within nine months of commission, but an accident happened in July 1876, delaying completion until the following year. The full-sized Tinto clay model, for the mould in which to cast this "massive" bronze, took eight months of "arduous labour" to complete by the evening of Friday 14 July; a hot night of 90 degrees Fahrenheit. His assistant moistened the clay that evening, but by seven a.m. the front of the model had exploded off its framework. The Scotsman reported:

"It was found a hideous ruin, great masses of clay having fallen away so as to expose the wooden framework on which the model had been built. The left arm lay on the floor at some little distance; the left hand side and upper half of the left leg, with a considerable portion of the front of the figure, were entirely gone; while the parts that remained showed several yawning cracks, with the exception of the head, which fortunately had escaped quite uninjured."

It was speculated that as the framework and its supporting iron bar were intact, internal expansion of hot air had done the damage. The memorial committee granted an extension.

=== Figure of Youth incident ===
In 1887 Hutchison made the gilded Figure of Youth which crowns the dome on Old College. Adam Hall was the model for this allegory of the ideal student brandishing the Torch of Knowledge, and he was also a burglar. He was charged and sentenced to three months in the Edinburgh Sheriff Criminal Court for breaking a window and desk lock on 11 June and stealing a watch, ring and £4 10s from Hutchison's studio.

=== Queen's portrait bust incident ===
In 1887 Hutchison completed a bust of Her Majesty the Queen, and of her consort Prince Albert, presented to the Victoria Art Galleries, Dundee by ex-Provost Ballingall, in the Queen's Golden Jubilee year. Many years later, after Hutchison had died, The Scotsman told this story: "One day, after the sitting, the Queen stood by the clay model as it was nearing completion, and gave her kindly criticism upon it. "Don't you think," said Her Majesty, "that this is a little prominent?" pointing to a part of the chin, and as she did so she placed her thumb, artist-like, on to the clay, which yielded to her touch. The sculptor took care that the mark Queen Victoria had left on her own bust was not effaced, and that it was duly carved in the more enduring marble."

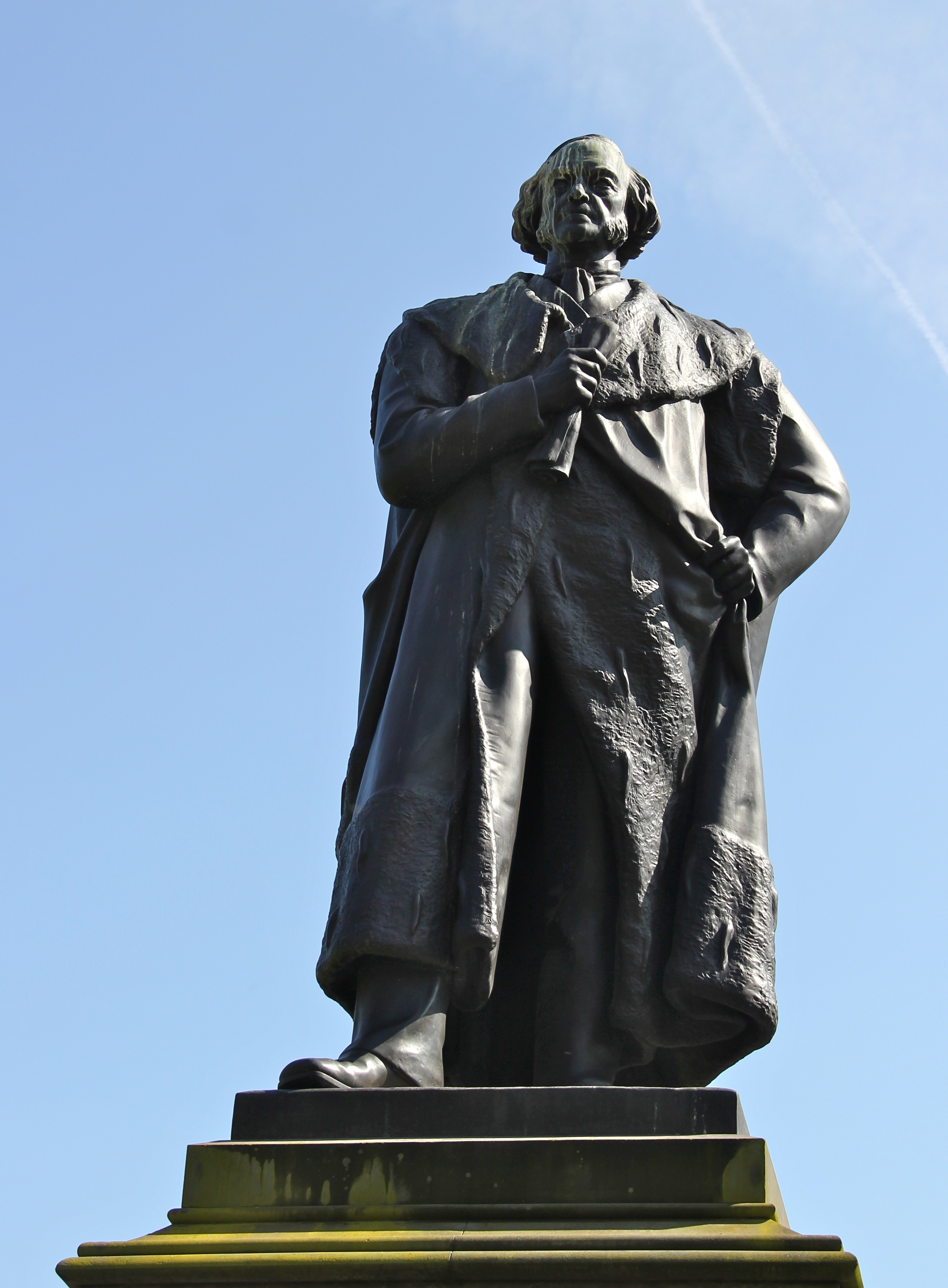
Adam Black (1877) in Princes Street Gardens

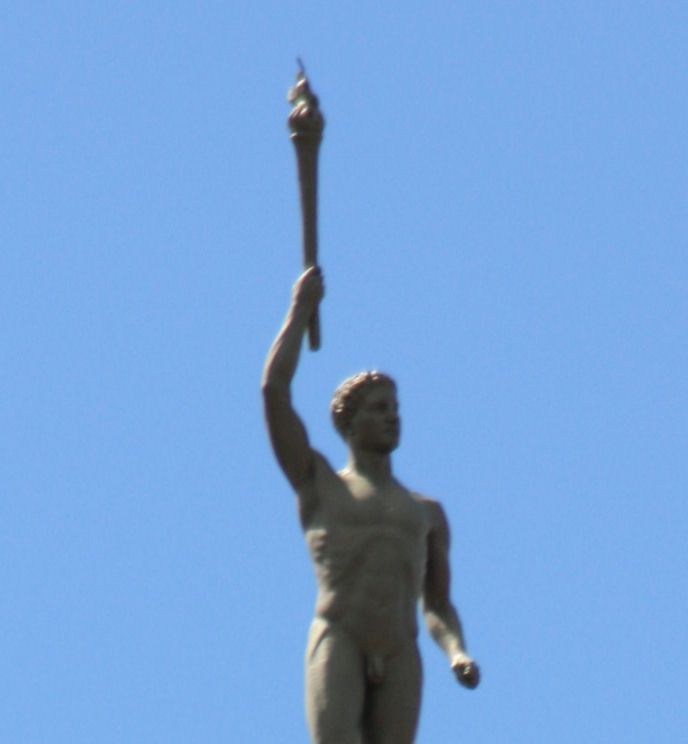
Figure of Youth (1887)

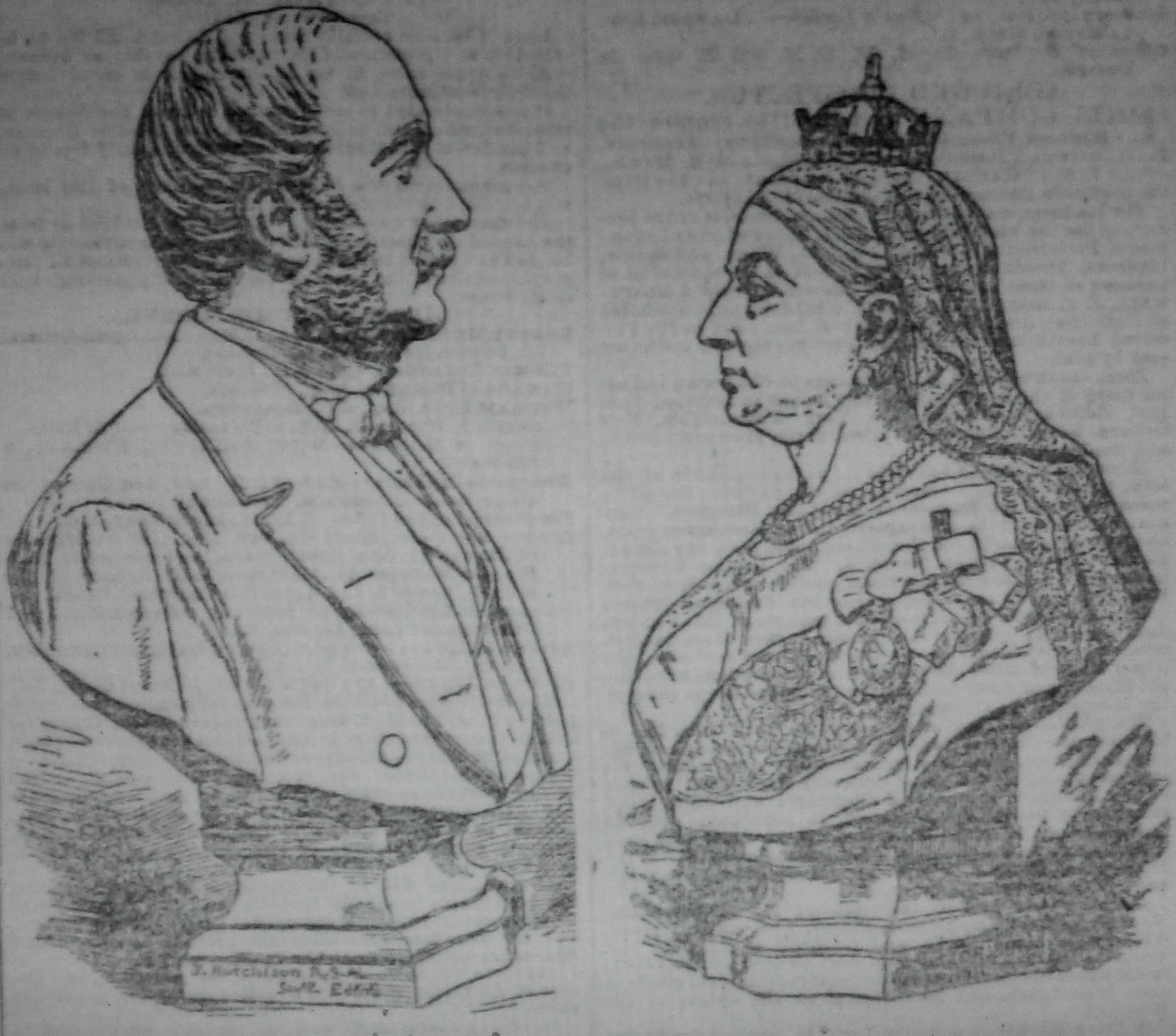
Her Majesty the Queen and her consort Prince Albert (1887)
