= Edinburgh (UK Parliament constituency) =

Parliamentary constituency in the United Kingdom, 1832–1885

- Former burgh constituency for the House of Commons
- Major settlements: Edinburgh

1708–1885
- Seats: 1708–1832: One; 1832–1885: Two
- Created from: Edinburgh
- Replaced by: Edinburgh Central; Edinburgh South; Edinburgh East; Edinburgh West

Edinburgh was a burgh constituency of the House of Commons of the Parliament of Great Britain from 1708 to 1801 and of the Parliament of the United Kingdom from 1801 until 1885.

== Creation ==
The British parliamentary constituency was created in 1708 following the Acts of Union, 1707 and replaced the former Parliament of Scotland burgh constituency of Edinburgh.

== History ==
The constituency elected one Member of Parliament (MP) by the first past the post system until representation was increased to two members in 1832. It was abolished in 1885, being split into Edinburgh Central, Edinburgh South, Edinburgh East and Edinburgh West.

== Boundaries ==
The boundaries of the constituency, as set out in the Representation of the People (Scotland) Act 1832, were-

"From a Point on the Road from Leith to Queensferry which is distant Four hundred Yards (measured along such Road) to the West of the Point at which the same meets the Inverleith Road at the House called Golden Acre, in a straight Line to the North-western Corner of the Enclosure of John Watsons Institution; thence in a straight Line to the Second Stone Bridge, marked No. 2, on the Union Canal; thence in a straight Line to the Point at which the Western Wall of the Enclosure of the Lunatic Asylum at Morningside meets the Jordan or Pow Burn; thence down the Jordan or Pow Burn to a Point which is distant One hundred and fifty Yards (measured along such Burn) below the Arch over the same on the Carlisle Road; thence in a straight Line to the Summit of Arthur's Seat, thence in a straight Line to the Point at which the Feeder enters the Western Side of Lochend Loch; thence in a straight Line to the Point at which Pilrig Street joins Leith Walk; thence along Pilrig Street and the Bonnington Road to the Point at which the latter meets the Road from Leith to Queensferry; thence along the Road from Leith to Queensferry to the Point first described."

== Members of Parliament ==
=== MPs 1708–1832 ===
| Election | Member | Party |
|---|---|---|
| 1708 | Sir Samuel McClellan | |
| 1709 by-election | Sir Patrick Johnston | |
| 1713 | Sir James Stewart | Whig |
| 1715 | Sir George Warrender | |
| 1721 by-election | John Campbell | |
| 1734 | Paul Lindsay | |
| 1741 | Archibald Stewart | |
| 1747 | James Ker | |
| 1754 | William Alexander | |
| 1761 | George Lind | |
| 1762 by-election | James Coutts | |
| 1768 | Sir Lawrence Dundas | Whig |
| 1780 | William Miller | |
| 1781 | Sir Lawrence Dundas | Whig |
| 1781 by-election | James Hunter Blair | |
| 1784 by-election | Sir Adam Fergusson | |
| 1790 | Henry Dundas | Tory |
| 1803 by-election | Charles Hope | Tory |
| 1805 by-election | George Abercromby | Whig |
| 1806 | Sir Patrick Murray | |
| 1812 by-election | William Dundas | Tory |
| 1831 | Robert Dundas | Tory |

=== MPs 1832–1885 ===
Under the Representation of the People Act 1832, Edinburgh's representation was increased to two members.

| Election | 1st Member | 1st Party | 2nd Member | 2nd Party |
|---|---|---|---|---|
| 1832 | Francis Jeffrey | Whig | James Abercromby, later Baron Dunfermline | Whig |
| 1834 by-election | Sir John Campbell, later Baron Campbell | Whig | James Abercromby, later Baron Dunfermline | Whig |
| 1839 by-election | Sir John Campbell, later Baron Campbell | Whig | Thomas Babington Macaulay, later Baron Macaulay | Whig |
| 1841 | Sir William Gibson-Craig | Whig | Thomas Babington Macaulay, later Baron Macaulay | Whig |
| 1847 | Sir William Gibson-Craig | Whig | Charles Cowan | Radical |
| 1852 | Thomas Babington Macaulay | Whig | Charles Cowan | Radical |
| 1856 by-election | Adam Black | Whig | Charles Cowan | Radical |
| 1859 | Adam Black | Liberal | James Moncreiff, later Baron Moncreiff | Liberal |
| 1865 | Duncan McLaren | Liberal | James Moncreiff, later Baron Moncreiff | Liberal |
| 1868 | Duncan McLaren | Liberal | John Miller | Liberal |
| 1874 | Duncan McLaren | Liberal | James Cowan | Liberal |
| 1880 | Duncan McLaren | Liberal | James Cowan | Liberal |
| January 1881 by-election | John McLaren | Liberal | James Cowan | Liberal |
| August 1881 by-election | Thomas Buchanan | Liberal | James Cowan | Liberal |
| 1882 by-election | Thomas Buchanan | Liberal | Samuel Danks Waddy | Liberal |
| 1885 | constituency divided: see Central, East, South and West divisions | | | |

== Election results ==
=== Elections in the 1880s ===
By-election, 4 Nov 1882: Edinburgh
| Party | Candidate | Votes | % | ±% |
|---|---|---|---|---|
| Liberal | Samuel Danks Waddy | 8,455 | 52.3 | −33.8 |
| Independent Liberal | James Hall Renton | 7,718 | 47.7 | New |
| Majority | | 737 | 4.6 | −23.9 |
| Turnout | | 16,173 | 55.3 | −5.9 (est) |
| Registered electors | | 29,252 | | |
| Liberal hold | | Swing | N/A | |

- Caused by Cowan's resignation.

By-election, 24 Aug 1881: Edinburgh
| Party | Candidate | Votes | % | ±% |
|---|---|---|---|---|
| Liberal | Thomas Buchanan | Unopposed | | |
| Liberal hold | | | | |

- Caused by McLaren's appointment as Senator of the College of Justice and elevation to the peerage, becoming Lord McLaren.

By-election, 28 Jan 1881: Edinburgh
| Party | Candidate | Votes | % | ±% |
|---|---|---|---|---|
| Liberal | John McLaren | 11,390 | 74.3 | −11.8 |
| Independent Liberal | Edward Jenkins | 3,940 | 25.7 | New |
| Majority | | 7,450 | 48.6 | +20.1 |
| Turnout | | 15,330 | 53.5 | −7.7 (est) |
| Registered electors | | 28,644 | | |
| Liberal hold | | Swing | N/A | |

- Caused by McLaren's resignation.

General election 1880: Edinburgh
| Party | Candidate | Votes | % | ±% |
|---|---|---|---|---|
| Liberal | Duncan McLaren | 17,807 | 43.7 | +8.1 |
| Liberal | James Cowan | 17,301 | 42.4 | +15.2 |
| Conservative | John Macdonald | 5,651 | 13.9 | −3.9 |
| Majority | | 11,650 | 28.5 | +20.7 |
| Turnout | | 17,458 (est) | 61.2 (est) | −15.0 |
| Registered electors | | 28,524 | | |
| Liberal hold | | Swing | +5.0 | |
| Liberal hold | | Swing | +8.6 | |

=== Elections in the 1870s ===
General election 1874: Edinburgh
| Party | Candidate | Votes | % | ±% |
|---|---|---|---|---|
| Liberal | Duncan McLaren | 11,431 | 35.6 | N/A |
| Liberal | James Cowan | 8,749 | 27.2 | N/A |
| Liberal | John Miller | 6,218 | 19.4 | N/A |
| Conservative | John Macdonald | 5,713 | 17.8 | New |
| Majority | | 2,531 | 7.8 | N/A |
| Turnout | | 18,912 (est) | 76.2 (est) | N/A |
| Registered electors | | 24,832 | | |
| Liberal hold | | | | |
| Liberal hold | | | | |

=== Elections in the 1860s ===
General election 1868: Edinburgh
| Party | Candidate | Votes | % | ±% |
|---|---|---|---|---|
| Liberal | Duncan McLaren | Unopposed | | |
| Liberal | John Miller | Unopposed | | |
| Registered electors | | 20,779 | | |
| Liberal hold | | | | |
| Liberal hold | | | | |

General election 1865: Edinburgh
| Party | Candidate | Votes | % | ±% |
|---|---|---|---|---|
| Liberal | Duncan McLaren | 4,354 | 27.2 | N/A |
| Liberal | James Moncreiff | 4,148 | 25.9 | N/A |
| Liberal | Adam Black | 3,797 | 23.7 | N/A |
| Liberal | John Miller | 3,723 | 23.2 | N/A |
| Majority | | 351 | 2.2 | N/A |
| Turnout | | 8,011 (est) | 77.5 (est) | N/A |
| Registered electors | | 10,343 | | |
| Liberal hold | | | | |
| Liberal hold | | | | |

=== Elections in the 1850s ===
By-election, 28 June 1859: Edinburgh
| Party | Candidate | Votes | % | ±% |
|---|---|---|---|---|
| Liberal | James Moncreiff | Unopposed | | |
| Liberal hold | | | | |

- Caused by Moncreiff's appointment as Lord Advocate

General election 1859: Edinburgh
| Party | Candidate | Votes | % | ±% |
|---|---|---|---|---|
| Liberal | Adam Black | Unopposed | | |
| Liberal | James Moncreiff | Unopposed | | |
| Registered electors | | 8,347 | | |
| Liberal hold | | | | |
| Liberal hold | | | | |

General election 1857: Edinburgh
| Party | Candidate | Votes | % | ±% |
|---|---|---|---|---|
| Whig | Adam Black | Unopposed | | |
| Radical | Charles Cowan | Unopposed | | |
| Registered electors | | 8,297 | | |
| Whig hold | | | | |
| Radical hold | | | | |

By-election, 9 February 1856: February
| Party | Candidate | Votes | % | ±% |
|---|---|---|---|---|
| Whig | Adam Black | 2,429 | 57.6 | +30.4 |
| Peelite | Francis Brown Douglas | 1,786 | 42.4 | +33.3 |
| Majority | | 643 | 15.2 | +10.7 |
| Turnout | | 4,215 | 50.8 | −4.4 |
| Registered electors | | 8,297 | | |
| Whig hold | | Swing | −1.5 | |

- Caused by Macaulay's resignation by accepting the office of Steward of the Manor of Hempholme

General election 1852: Edinburgh
| Party | Candidate | Votes | % | ±% |
|---|---|---|---|---|
| Whig | Thomas Babington Macaulay | 1,872 | 27.2 | +4.0 |
| Radical | Charles Cowan | 1,754 | 25.5 | −6.9 |
| Radical | Duncan McLaren | 1,559 | 22.7 | N/A |
| Conservative | Thomas Charles Bruce | 1,065 | 15.5 | +0.1 |
| Peelite | Alexander Campbell Cameron | 625 | 9.1 | N/A |
| Turnout | | 3,438 (est) | 55.2 (est) | +10.4 |
| Registered electors | | 6,230 | | |
| Majority | | 313 | 4.5 | −9.2 |
| Whig hold | | Swing | +5.5 | |
| Majority | | 689 | 10.0 | +0.8 |
| Radical hold | | Swing | −5.5 | |

=== Elections in the 1840s ===
By-election, 15 December 1847: Edinburgh
| Party | Candidate | Votes | % | ±% |
|---|---|---|---|---|
| Radical | Charles Cowan | Unopposed | | |
| Radical hold | | | | |

- Caused by Cowan's election in 1847 being declared void, due to him being disqualified for holding a government contract at the time of the election

General election 1847: Edinburgh
| Party | Candidate | Votes | % | ±% |
|---|---|---|---|---|
| Radical | Charles Cowan | 2,063 | 32.4 | N/A |
| Whig | William Gibson-Craig | 1,854 | 29.1 | N/A |
| Whig | Thomas Babington Macaulay | 1,477 | 23.2 | N/A |
| Conservative | Peter Blackburn | 980 | 15.4 | New |
| Turnout | | 3,187 (est) | 44.8 (est) | N/A |
| Registered electors | | 7,114 | | |
| Majority | | 586 | 9.2 | N/A |
| Radical gain from Whig | | Swing | N/A | |
| Majority | | 874 | 13.7 | N/A |
| Whig hold | | Swing | N/A | |

By-election, 15 July 1846: Edinburgh
| Party | Candidate | Votes | % | ±% |
|---|---|---|---|---|
| Whig | Thomas Babington Macaulay | 1,735 | 67.6 | N/A |
| Whig | Culling Eardley | 832 | 32.4 | N/A |
| Majority | | 903 | 35.2 | N/A |
| Turnout | | 2,567 | 42.0 | N/A |
| Registered electors | | 6,118 | | |
| Whig hold | | Swing | N/A | |

- Caused by Macaulay's appointment as Paymaster General

By-election, 13 July 1846: Edinburgh
| Party | Candidate | Votes | % | ±% |
|---|---|---|---|---|
| Whig | William Gibson-Craig | Unopposed | | |
| Whig hold | | | | |

- Caused by Gibson-Craig's appointment as a Lord Commissioner of the Treasury

General election 1841: Edinburgh
| Party | Candidate | Votes | % | ±% |
|---|---|---|---|---|
| Whig | Thomas Babington Macaulay | Unopposed | | |
| Whig | William Gibson-Craig | Unopposed | | |
| Registered electors | | 5,346 | | |
| Whig hold | | | | |
| Whig gain from Speaker | | | | |

By-election, 23 January 1840: Edinburgh
| Party | Candidate | Votes | % | ±% |
|---|---|---|---|---|
| Whig | Thomas Babington Macaulay | Unopposed | | |
| Whig hold | | | | |

- Caused by Macaulay's appointment as Secretary at War

=== Elections in the 1830s ===
By-election, 4 June 1839: Edinburgh
| Party | Candidate | Votes | % |
|---|---|---|---|
| Whig | Thomas Babington Macaulay | Unopposed | |
| Whig gain from Speaker | | | |

- Caused by Abercromby's elevation to the peerage, becoming 1st Baron Dunfermline

General election 1837: Edinburgh
| Party | Candidate | Votes | % |
|---|---|---|---|
| Speaker | James Abercromby | Unopposed | |
| Whig | John Campbell | Unopposed | |
| Registered electors | | 9,640 | |
| Speaker gain from Whig | | | |
| Whig hold | | | |

By-election, 30 April 1835: Edinburgh
| Party | Candidate | Votes | % |
|---|---|---|---|
| Whig | John Campbell | Unopposed | |
| Whig hold | | | |

- Caused by Campbell's appointment as Attorney General for England and Wales

General election 1835: Edinburgh
| Party | Candidate | Votes | % | ±% |
|---|---|---|---|---|
| Whig | James Abercromby | 2,963 | 32.4 | −10.5 |
| Whig | John Campbell | 2,858 | 31.3 | −9.6 |
| Conservative | James Broun-Ramsay | 1,716 | 18.8 | +10.7 |
| Conservative | John Learmonth | 1,608 | 17.6 | +9.5 |
| Majority | | 1,142 | 12.5 | −12.2 |
| Turnout | | 4,679 | 59.5 | c. −18.2 |
| Registered electors | | 7,862 | | |
| Whig hold | | Swing | −10.3 | |
| Whig hold | | Swing | −9.9 | |

By-election, 23 June 1834
| Party | Candidate | Votes | % |
|---|---|---|---|
| Whig | James Abercromby | Unopposed | |
| Whig hold | | | |

- Caused by Abercromby's appointment as Master of the Mint

Edinburgh by-election, 2 June 1834
| Party | Candidate | Votes | % | ±% |
|---|---|---|---|---|
| Whig | John Campbell | 1,932 | 50.7 | −33.1 |
| Tory | John Learmonth | 1,401 | 36.7 | +20.5 |
| Radical | James Aytoun | 480 | 12.6 | N/A |
| Majority | | 531 | 14.0 | −10.7 |
| Turnout | | 3,813 | 58.6 | c. −19.1 |
| Registered electors | | 6,512 | | |
| Whig hold | | Swing | −26.8 | |

- Caused by Jeffrey's appointment as a Senator of the College of Justice, and his elevation to Lord Jeffrey

General election 1832: Edinburgh
| Party | Candidate | Votes | % | ±% |
|---|---|---|---|---|
| Whig | Francis Jeffrey | 4,035 | 42.9 | +21.2 |
| Whig | James Abercromby | 3,850 | 40.9 | +19.2 |
| Tory | Forbes Blair | 1,519 | 16.2 | −41.4 |
| Majority | | 2,331 | 24.7 | N/A |
| Turnout | | c. 4,702 | c. 77.7 | c. −22.3 |
| Registered electors | | 6,048 | | |
| Whig gain from Tory | | Swing | +21.0 | |
| Whig win (new seat) | | | | |

- The Radical candidate, James Aytoun, withdrew in favour of Jeffrey and Abercromby

General election 1831: Edinburgh
| Party | Candidate | Votes | % |
|---|---|---|---|
| Tory | Robert Dundas | 17 | 51.5 |
| Whig | Francis Jeffrey | 14 | 42.4 |
| Tory | William Allan | 2 | 6.1 |
| Majority | | 3 | 9.1 |
| Turnout | | 33 | 100.0 |
| Registered electors | | 33 | |
| Tory hold | | | |

General election 1830: Edinburgh
| Party | Candidate | Votes | % |
|---|---|---|---|
| Tory | William Dundas | Unopposed | |
| Registered electors | | 33 | |
| Tory hold | | | |

=== Elections in the 1820s ===
General election 1826: Edinburgh
| Party | Candidate | Votes | % | ±% |
|---|---|---|---|---|
| Tory | William Dundas | Unopposed | N/A | N/A |

General election 1820: Edinburgh
| Party | Candidate | Votes | % | ±% |
|---|---|---|---|---|
| Tory | William Dundas | 25 | 89.3 | |
| Whig | James Maitland | 3 | 10.7 | |
| Majority | | 22 | 78.6 | |
| Turnout | | 28 | | |
| Tory hold | | Swing | | |

== See also ==
- Politics of Edinburgh

Parliament of the United Kingdom
| Preceded by Cambridge University | Constituency represented by the speaker 1835 – 1839 | Succeeded by Hampshire North |
