= James Cowan (Scottish politician) =

Scottish politician

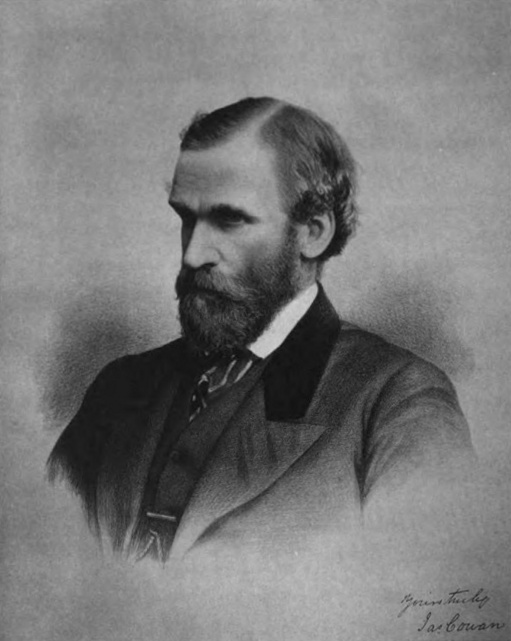
James Cowan, Lord Provost of Edinburgh

James Cowan (1816 – 24 November 1895) was a Liberal Party politician in Scotland.

He was the son of Alexander Cowan, papermaker and philanthropist. He was one of eleven children including Charles Cowan MP, and Sir John Cowan, 1st Baronet.

He was Lord Provost of Edinburgh from 1872 to 1874.

He was elected at the 1874 general election as a Member of Parliament for Edinburgh, and held the seat until he resigned from the House of Commons in 1882 by the procedural device of taking the office of Crown Steward and Bailiff of the three Chiltern Hundreds of Stoke, Desborough and Burnham.

He is buried with his family on the west side of the original cemetery in Grange Cemetery in Edinburgh.

Parliament of the United Kingdom
Preceded by Duncan McLaren; John Miller	Member of Parliament for Edinburgh; 1874–1882; With: Duncan McLaren to Jan 1881; John McLaren Jan–Aug 1881; Thomas Buchanan 1881–1882	Succeeded by John McLaren; Samuel Danks Waddy
