= John Miller (engineer) =

Scottish civil engineer and Liberal Party politician

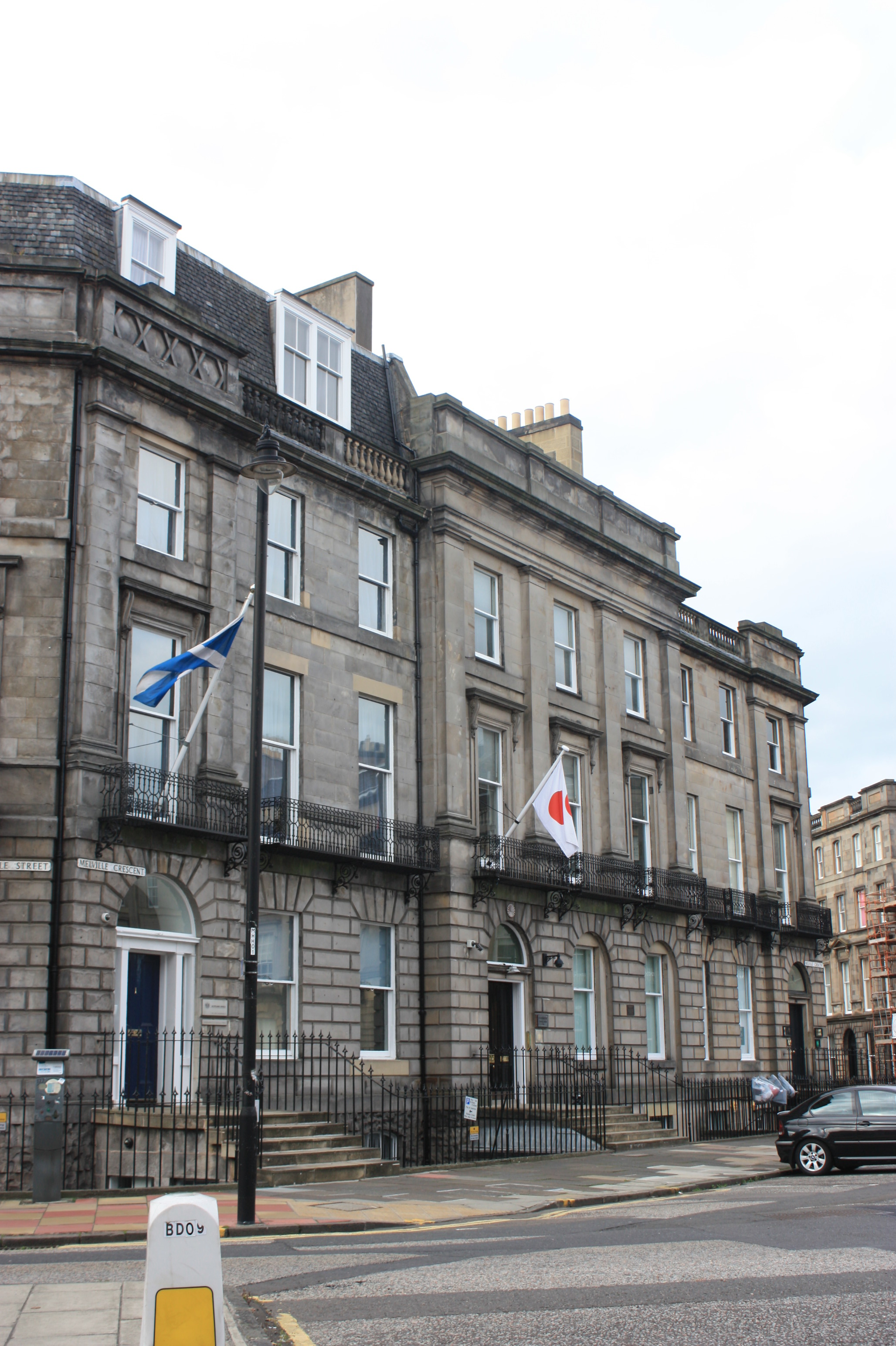
Miller's house in Melville Crescent, Edinburgh (centre)

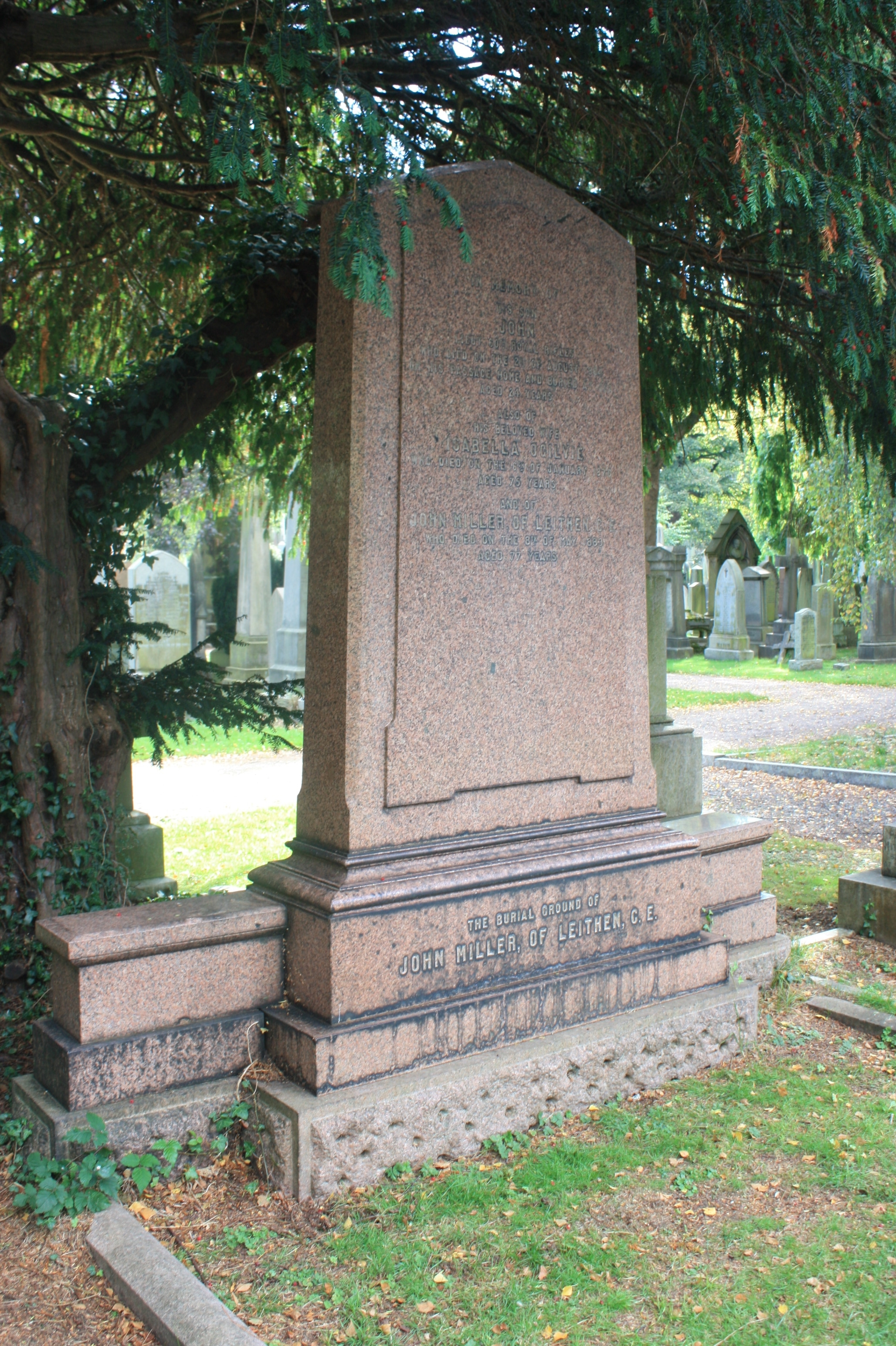
The grave of John Miller of Leithen, Dean Cemetery

John Miller of Leithen FRSE MICE DL (26 July 1805 – 8 May 1883) was a Scottish civil engineer and Liberal Party politician. Together with Thomas Grainger, he formed the influential engineering firm Grainger and Miller, specialising in railway viaducts.

== Life ==
Miller was born in Ayr on 26 July 1805, the son of Margaret Caldwell and James Miller, a wright and builder. He attended Ayr Academy and then studied law at the University of Edinburgh going on to be a legal apprentice with A Murdoch Esq, a lawyer in Ayr. His interests then turned from law to engineering.

In 1825 he went into partnership with Thomas Grainger. The partnership was responsible for many of Scotland's railway projects. Miller took the lead role in surveying the Edinburgh and Glasgow Railway. He designed many viaducts, including the Lugar Viaduct, Cumnock and the Ballochmyle Viaduct, Mauchline. Miller designed and led the construction of the Almond Valley Viaduct to carry the Glasgow–Edinburgh via Falkirk line which was completed in 1842. The viaduct is 1.5 miles long with 36 masonry arches and is now Category A listed. Miller designed the route to keep the railway as level over as much of the route as was possible. Miller designed a planned maximum gradient of 1 in 880 with the aim of ensuring the Edinburgh and Glasgow Railway was the most level main line in the UK at the time.

Although primarily a railway engineer, including the design of railway stations, he was also responsible for the construction of Granton Harbour.

Miller trained the engineer Benjamin Blyth.

Miller was elected a Fellow of the Royal Society of Edinburgh in 1841 his proposer being the architect William Burn. The civil engineer James Deas apprenticed under Miller from 1841 to 1844.

In 1842 he bought the Millfield Estate in Polmont near Falkirk and began building a large house to his own design, naming it Millfield House (demolished 1958). The family moved here when Miller retired from engineering in 1850. In 1852 he bought the 5,260 hectares (13,000 acres) site of Leithen near Innerleithen enlarging a 16th-century house to 13,274 square feet (1,233.2 m^{2}) to create Leithen Lodge. He thereafter styled himself John Miller of Leithen. In 1853 he also bought the smaller but still considerable estate of Drumlithie in Kincardineshire.

During this period, as was normal for the time, he also had a townhouse in Edinburgh. This was originally at 132 George Street in the Edinburgh New Town however he later moved to the more spacious and fashionable West End, buying a newly built townhouse at 2 Melville Crescent.

Miller died at home, 2 Melville Crescent in Edinburgh on 8 May 1883. He is buried with his wife in the north-east section of the original Dean Cemetery in Edinburgh not far from the main entrance.

== Political career ==
As John Miller of Leithen, he unsuccessfully contested the Stirling Burghs at the 1852 general election, and was defeated again in Edinburgh at the 1865 general election. He was elected unopposed as one of two Members of Parliament for Edinburgh at the 1868 general election, but at the 1874 election he lost his seat to another Liberal candidate, James Cowan.

== Philanthropy ==
Miller left the established Church of Scotland in 1857 and became a strong advocate of the Free Church of Scotland. He made substantial donations to the building of the Free Church of Scotland in Polmont.

He established the Polmont Mutual Improvement Association which was then left to the direction of his head gardener, William Hepburn (1823–1890), in whom he also encouraged an interest in journalism.

== Family ==
Miller was married to Isabella Ogilvie (1799–1876) in 1834.

In 1858 his daughter Margaret Miller married the civil engineer George Cunningham of Lilliesmuir, Perth FRSE (1829–1897), who thereafter (due to the power of the Miller name in engineering) restyled himself as George Miller-Cunningham.

Miller's only son, normally referred to as John Miller Jr was also an engineer, living and practising from 25 Northumberland Street in Edinburgh. He died unexpectedly in 1864.

In February 1874 his daughter Jessie married John Webster, a barrister of the Inner Temple in London.

In June 1874 his youngest daughter Mary married Alexander Thomson a farmer from near Tillicoultry.

His second daughter, Isabella, never married and cared for Miller after his wife died.

His daughter Katherine Monilaws Miller (b.1849) married the wealthy John Phillips of Royston in north Edinburgh. She is also buried in Dean Cemetery some distance west of her father.

== Friendships ==
Miller was a close friend of David Octavius Hill from at least 1830. When Hill was only known as an artist Miller gave him many commissions to paint the more scenic sections of the railway lines he was creating. At the advent of photography Miller invested in much equipment and was a keen amateur. Together with the then professional photographer Hill they jointly created the Photographic Society of Scotland in 1856.

== Memorials ==
A plaque commemorating his life was unveiled at Haymarket railway station on the 200th anniversary of his birth.

In 2012, a memorial was unveiled at Ayr, funded by the Institution of Civil Engineers.

Another plaque to Miller and his work was unveiled in April 2014, at Ballochmyle Viaduct. The plaque was produced by the Institution of Civil Engineers and was jointly unveiled by the ICE President, Geoff French, and East Ayrshire Provost, Jim Todd.

Parliament of the United Kingdom
| Preceded by James Moncreiff; Duncan McLaren | Member of Parliament for Edinburgh; 1868–1874; With: Duncan McLaren | Succeeded by James Cowan; Duncan McLaren |
