= Adam Black =

Scottish publisher and politician (1784–1874)

Adam Black FRSE
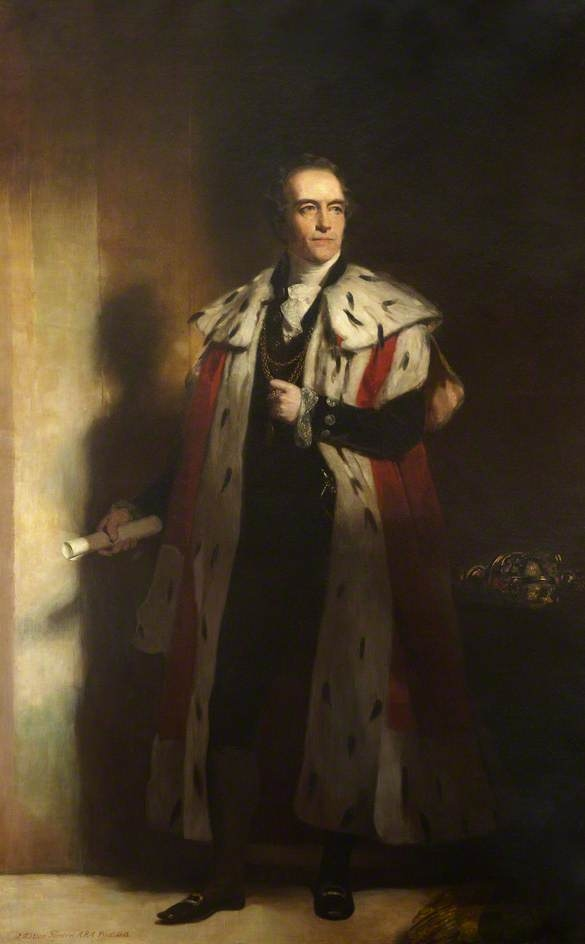
- Portrait by John Watson Gordon, 1847

Member of Parliament for Edinburgh
- In office 1856–1865

Personal details
- Born: 20 February 1784 Charles Street, Edinburgh, Scotland
- Died: 24 January 1874 (aged 89) Edinburgh, Scotland
- Resting place: Warriston Cemetery
- Party: Liberal
- Education: Royal High School, University of Edinburgh
- Profession: Publisher, Politician

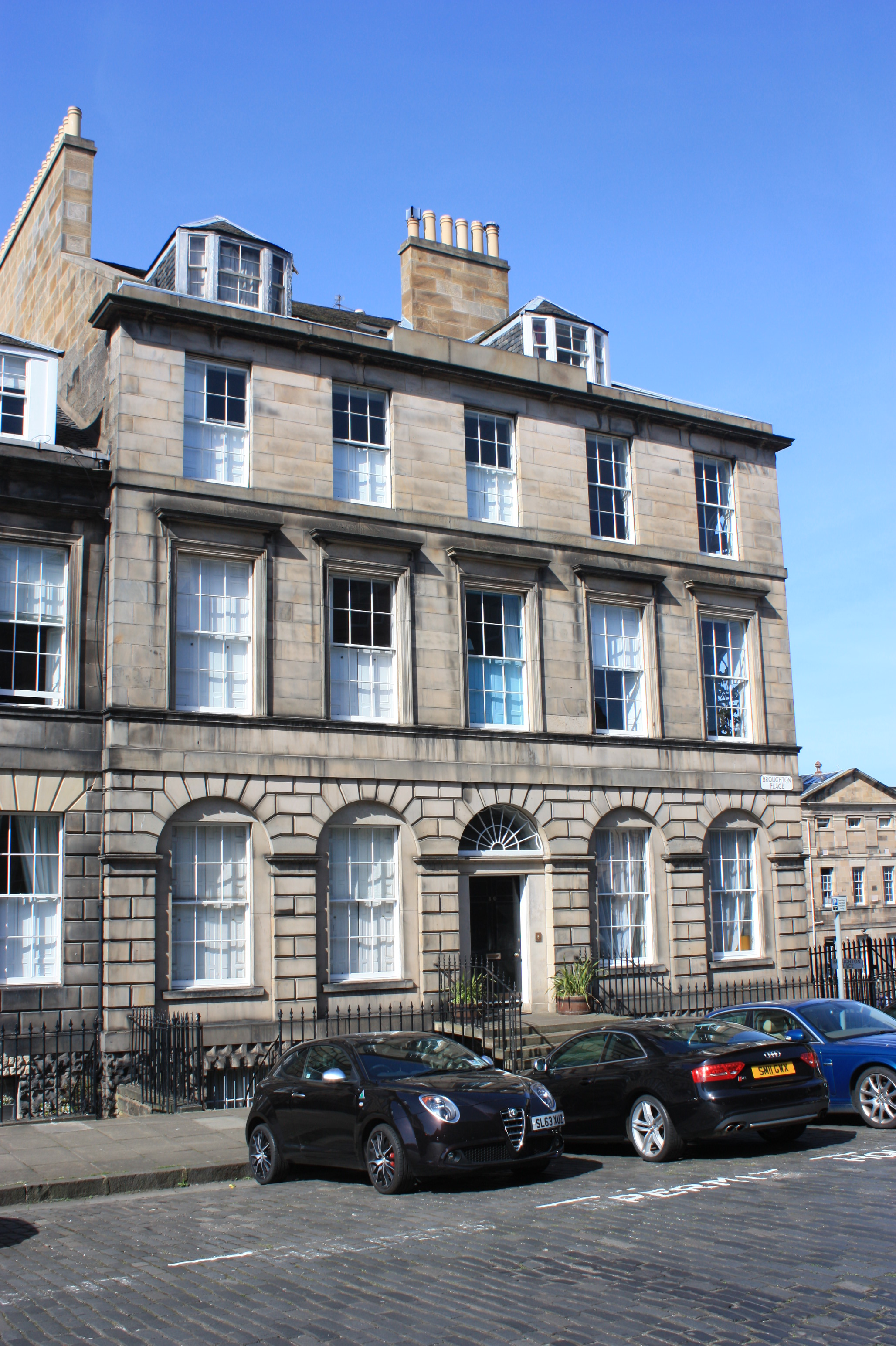
Black's house at 30 Broughton Place, Edinburgh

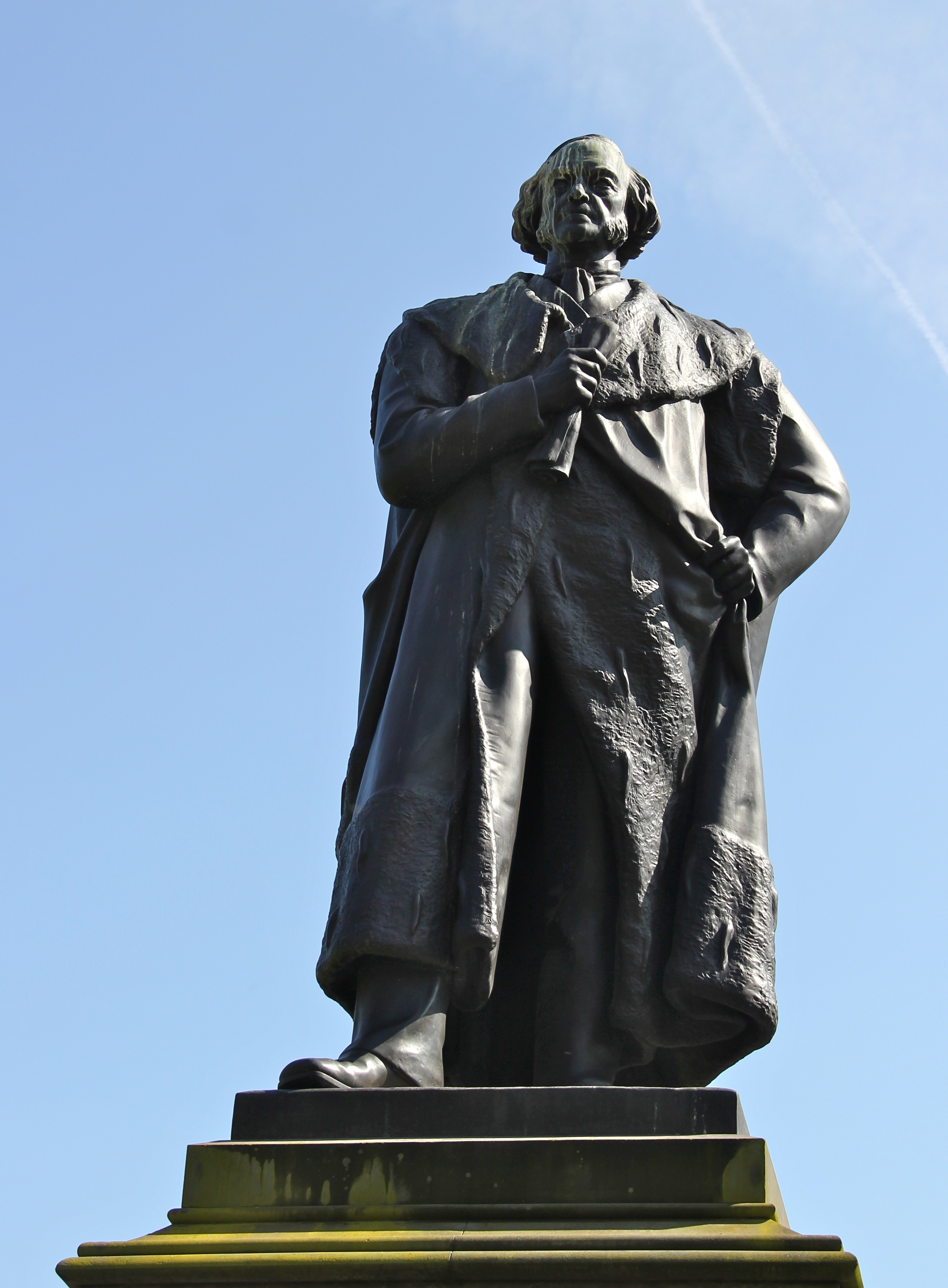
Statue of Adam Black in Princes Street Gardens

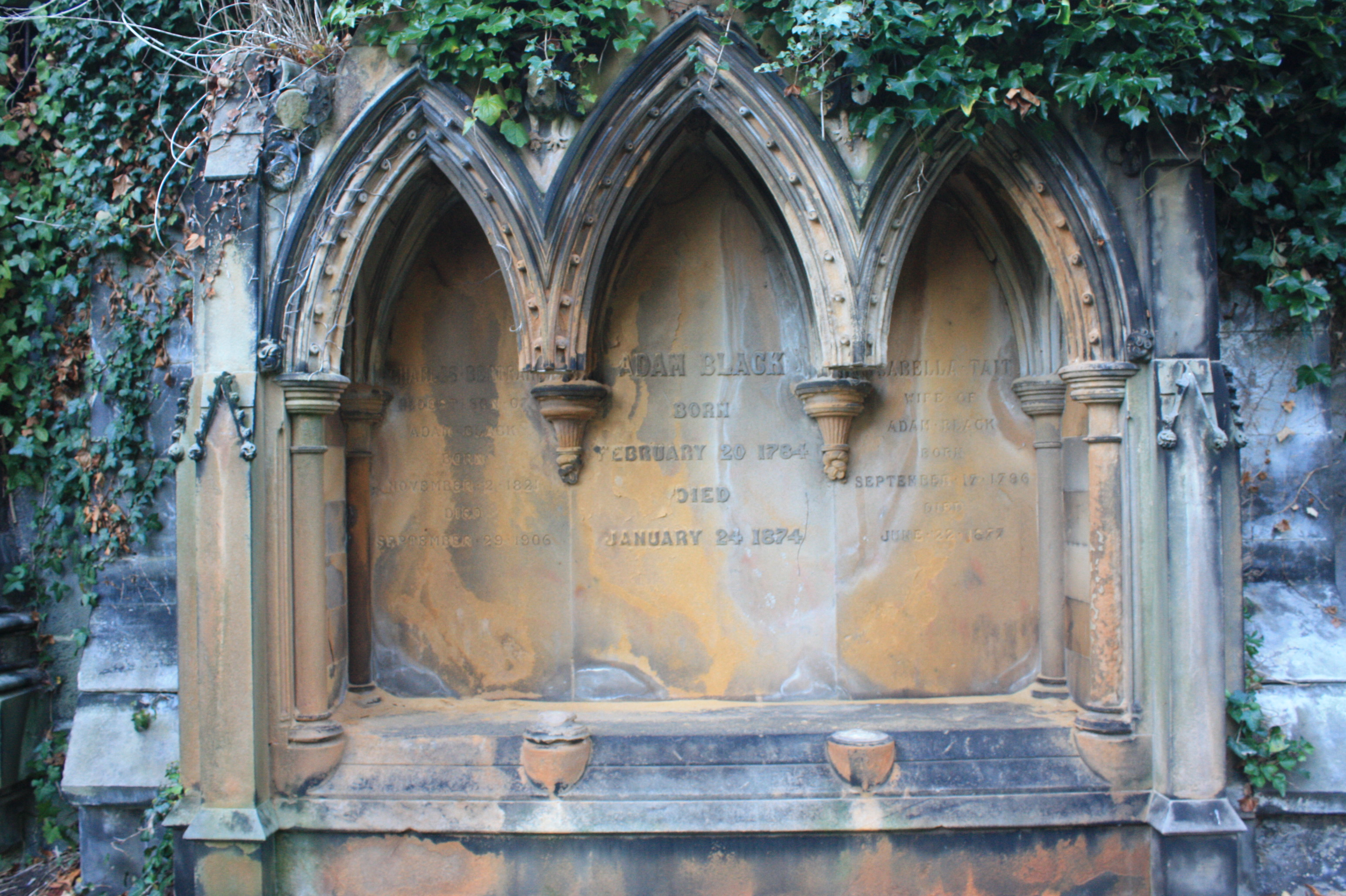
Adam Black's grave in Warriston Cemetery

Adam Black FRSE (20 February 1784 – 24 January 1874) was a Scottish publisher and politician. He founded the A & C Black publishing company, and published the 7th, 8th and 9th editions of the Encyclopædia Britannica.

== Life ==
Black was born in Charles Street, Edinburgh, the son of Isabella Nicol and Charles Black, a master builder. He was educated at the Royal High School and the University of Edinburgh. After serving as an apprentice to Mr Fairbairn, an Edinburgh bookseller, he began business for himself in Edinburgh in 1808. By 1826 he was recognised as one of the principal booksellers in the city; and a few years later he was joined in business by his nephew Charles.

In 1827 he purchased the copyright of the Encyclopædia Britannica, along with co-investors Macvey Napier and James Browne LLD. In this capacity he became publisher of the esteemed volume and produced the 7th, 8th and 9th editions of the Encyclopædia Britannica. He also negotiated the purchase of the stock and copyright of the Waverley Novels.

In 1817 he relocated his bookshop to 27 North Bridge in the Old Town and in 1832 his home is given as 30 Broughton Place in the eastern New Town. In 1851 the firm bought the copyright of the Waverley Novels for £27,000, and in 1861 they became the proprietors of De Quincey's works.

Adam Black was twice Lord Provost of Edinburgh, and represented the city in parliament from 1856 to 1865.

He retired from business in 1865, and lived his final years at 38 Drummond Place in the New Town. He died on 24 January 1874. He was succeeded by his sons, who removed their business in 1895 to London. In 1877 a bronze statue by John Hutchison of Adam Black was erected in East Princes Street Gardens, Edinburgh. He is buried in Warriston Cemetery on the outer face of the catacombs close to James Young Simpson.

== Family ==
Black was married to Isabella Tait (1796–1877). Their children included Charles Bertram Black (1821–1906), Francis Black (1830–1892) and Adam William Black (1836–1898).

His granddaughter, Eda Lawrie married the botanist Robert John Harvey Gibson.

== Trained under Black ==
William Durham FRSE (1834–1893) was apprenticed under Black.

Parliament of the United Kingdom
Preceded by Charles Cowan; Thomas Babington Macaulay	Member of Parliament for Edinburgh; 1856–1865; With: Charles Cowan 1856–59; James Moncreiff 1859–65	Succeeded by James Moncreiff; Duncan McLaren
