= James Deas (engineer) =

Scottish engineer

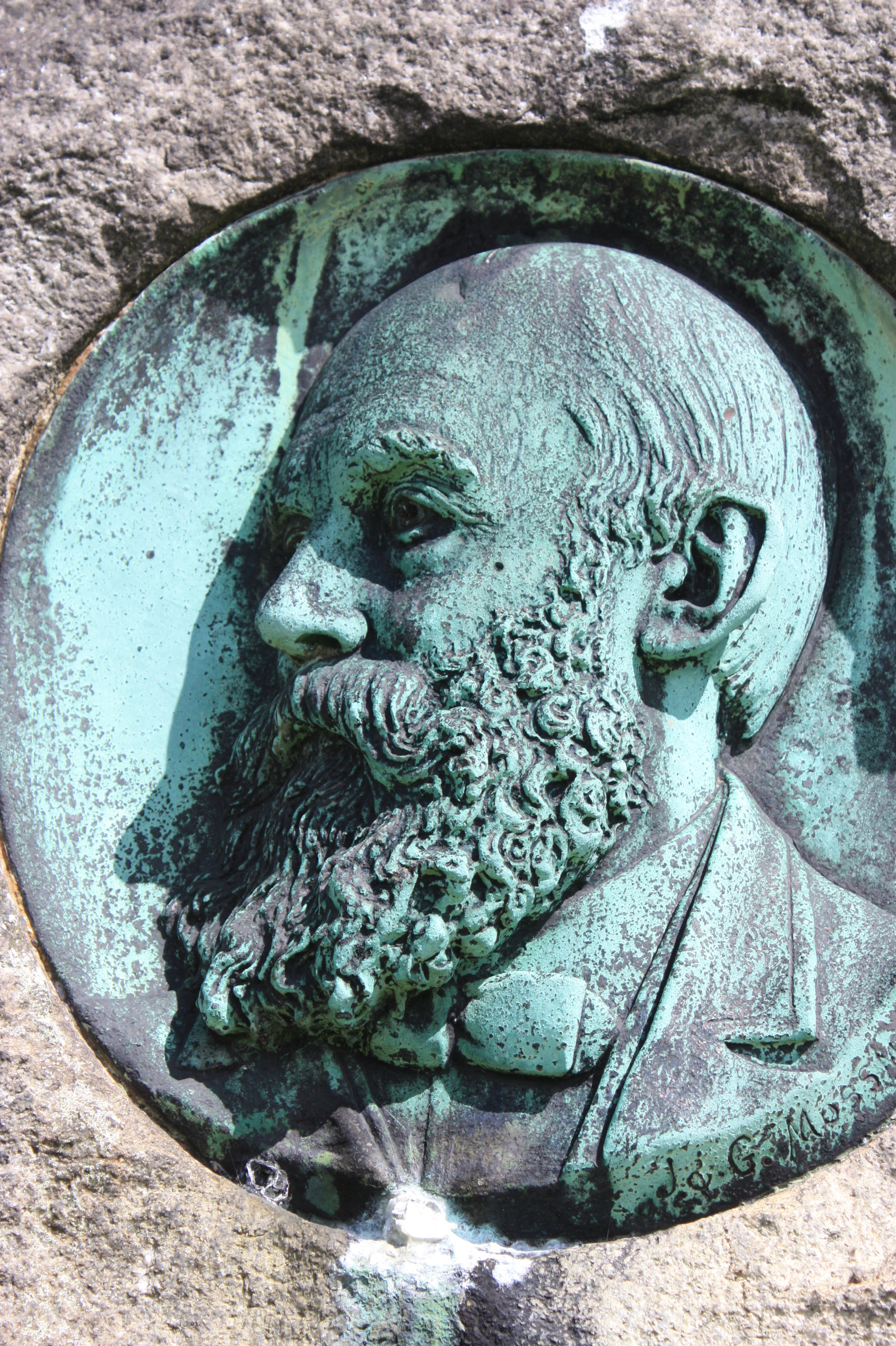
James Deas by James Pittendrigh Macgillivray

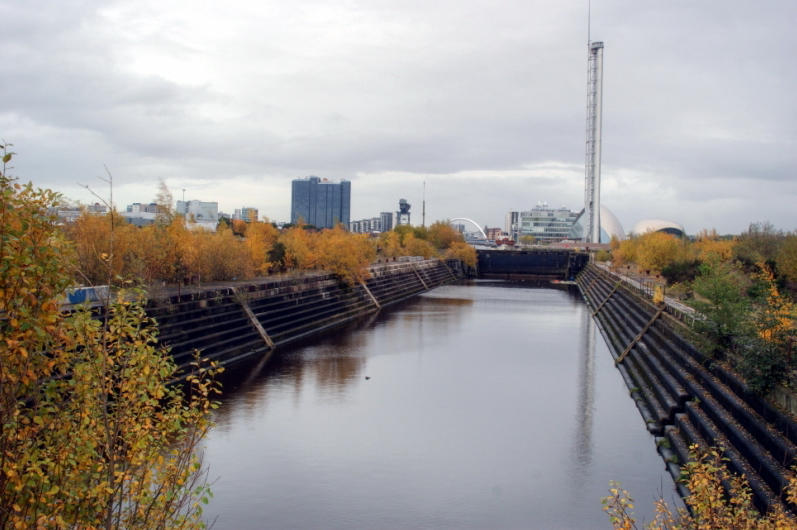
Govan graving dock)

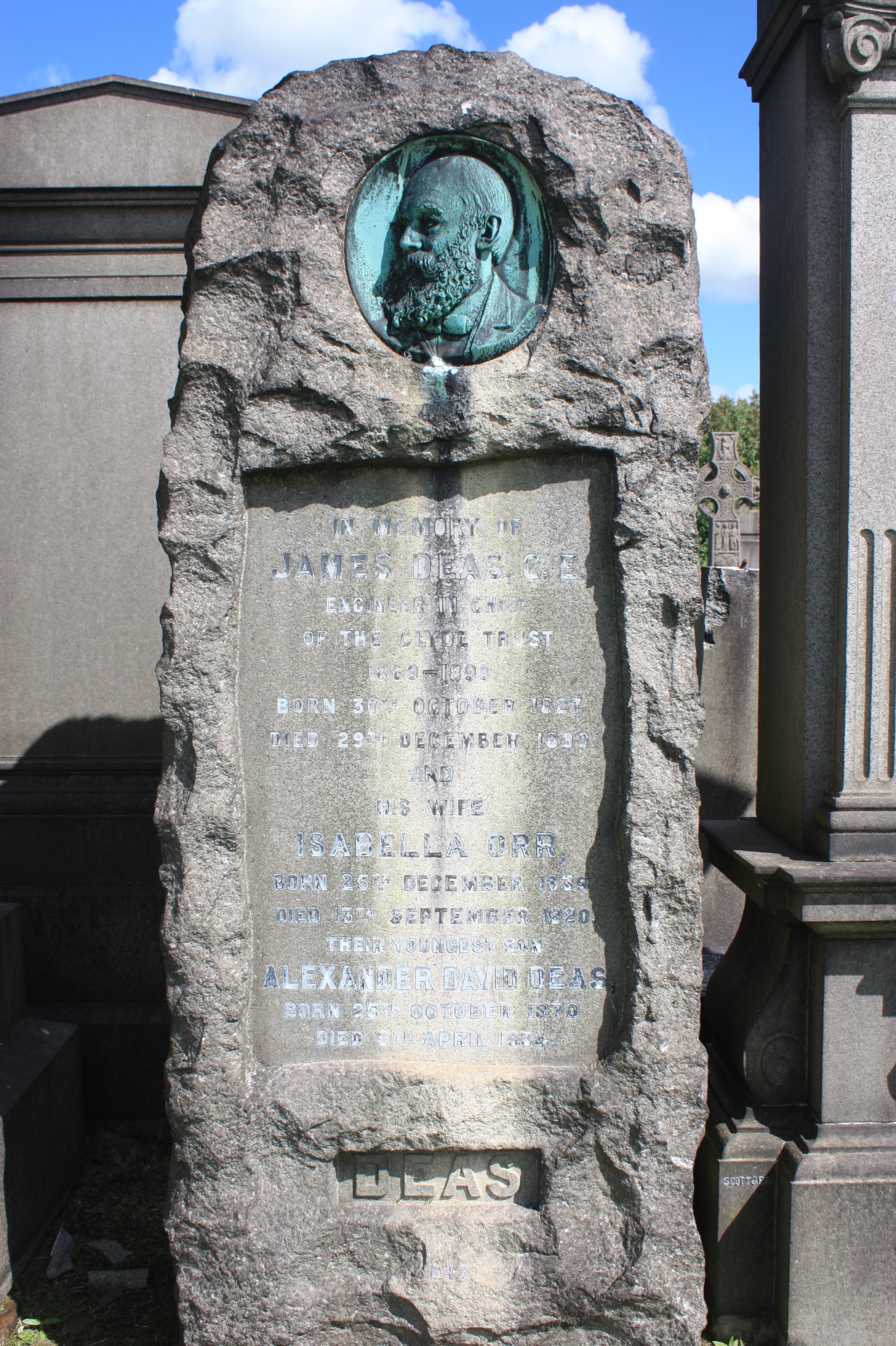
The grave of James Deas, Glasgow Necropolis

James Deas (1827 – 1899) was a 19th-century Scottish harbour engineer.

== Life ==
He was born on 30 October 1827 in Edinburgh the son of James Deas (1794–1856) from Leslie in Fife and his wife, Elizabeth Cairns. From 1841 he was apprenticed to the civil engineer, John Miller, at 1 Brandfield Place.

By 1851 he was living with his parents at High Cample village in Dumfriesshire. His father, also a railway engineer, had remarried by this stage. There were nine children in the family, presumably from both wives. Soon after James junior became Chief Engineer to the Edinburgh and Glasgow Railway Company. In 1869, aged only 42, he was appointed Chief Engineer to the Clyde Navigation Trust in succession to John Ure. He remained in this role for 30 years, during the golden days of Clyde shipbuilding. Under his control the area of the docks was greatly increased and the depth of the River Clyde was increased by 2m for a length of 25 km.

James died of a heart attack on 29 December 1899 whilst eating lunch at Daniel Brown's Restaurant at 79 St Vincent Street in Glasgow. He is buried in one of the north–south rows on the upper section of the Glasgow Necropolis. His grave was sculpted by John Mossman.

== Principal works ==
See

- Govan Graving Docks (1869 and 1883)
- Windmillcroft Quay (1877)
- Princes Dock (1887)

== Family ==
James was married to Isabella Orr (1839–1920).
