= John McLaren, Lord McLaren =

British politician and judge (1831–1910)

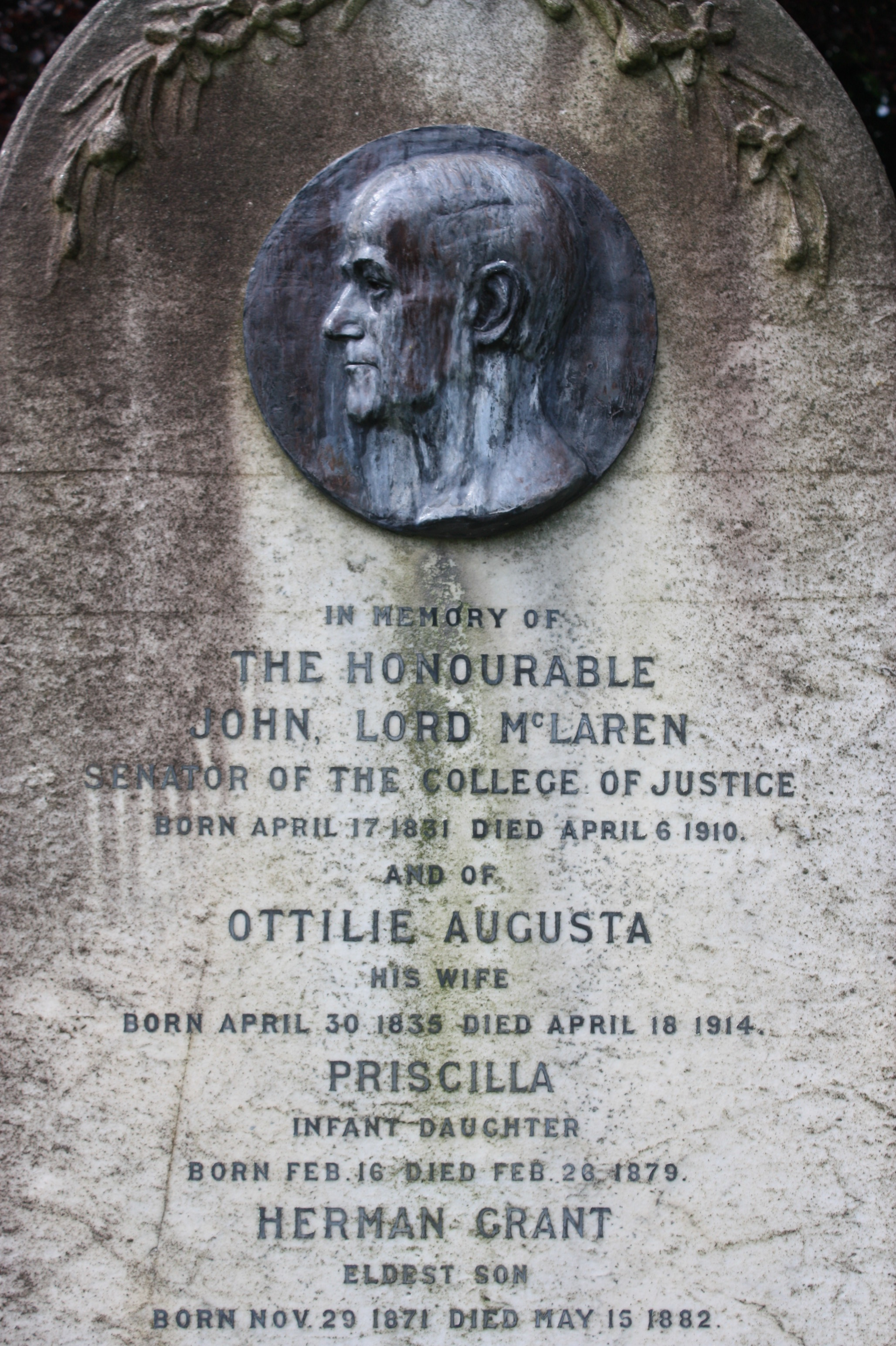
Lord McLaren's grave Grange Cemetery, Edinburgh

John McLaren, Lord McLaren, FRSE (17 April 1831 – 6 April 1910) was a British Liberal politician and judge. In the scientific world he is remembered as a mathematician and astronomer.

== Life ==
The son of Duncan McLaren, a former Provost of Edinburgh and Member of Parliament, and his wife Grant Aitken, he was born at 21 South St David Street, in Edinburgh's New Town.

He studied law at Edinburgh University. He was admitted to the Scottish Faculty of Advocates in 1856. In 1869, he was elected a Fellow of the Royal Society of Edinburgh, his proposer being Robert William Thomson. He served as the society's vice president for three sessions: 1885 to 1891; 1892 to 1898; and 1901 to 1906.

He held the office of Sheriff of Chancery in Scotland 1869–1880. He reorganised the Liberal party and arranged Gladstone's Midlothian campaign of 1879–1880.

He was elected Member of Parliament for Wigtown Burghs in April 1880 and appointed Lord Advocate, losing his seat on seeking re-election on 20 May 1880. He failed to be elected at Berwick-upon-Tweed on 21 July 1880, but was returned for Edinburgh on 28 January 1881. McLaren's father Duncan McLaren had resigned as MP for Edinburgh, which produced the vacancy to be filled. McLaren continued to sit for Edinburgh until he was appointed as a judge, later in the year. He was Lord Advocate for Scotland during 1880–81.

Under pressure from Gladstone and Sir William Harcourt, he accepted appointment to the bench in 1881 with the judicial title Lord McLaren. He was an eminently successful judge, and edited works on Scots law. While at the bar, McLaren authored and edited several significant legal works: a collection of statutes relating to procedure in Scotland's supreme courts (1861); a treatise on the law of trusts and trust settlements (1863); a work on the law of Scotland relating to wills (1868, revised 1894, which remained a leading authority); and an edition of Professor Bell's Commentaries on the Law of Scotland (1870). Beyond law, he pursued serious scientific interests: his mathematical papers were published by the Royal Society of Edinburgh, he served as president of the Scottish Meteorological Society, and was a director of the Ben Nevis Observatory. He was a close friend of Lord Kelvin and Professor Peter Guthrie Tait.For his contributions to astronomy and mathematics he was awarded honorary degrees (all LLD) from Edinburgh University, the University of Glasgow and the University of Aberdeen.

Lord McLaren died in Brighton in Sussex on 6 April 1910 but was returned to Edinburgh for burial in the Grange Cemetery on its southernmost path. The original bronze medallion head was stolen but it is replaced with an accurate and convincing plastic replica.

== Family ==
In 1868, he married Ottile Schwabe (d.1914). Their children largely died in childhood. Their eldest daughter was Ottilie McLaren.

== Artistic recognition ==
His portrait by Sir John Lavery is held in the Scottish National Portrait Gallery but is seldom displayed.

Parliament of the United Kingdom
Preceded by Mark John Stewart	Member of Parliament for Wigtown Burghs; 1880–1880	Succeeded by Mark John Stewart
Preceded by James Cowan and Duncan McLaren	Member of Parliament for Edinburgh; 1881–1881; With: James Cowan	Succeeded by James Cowan and Thomas Buchanan
Legal offices
Preceded by William Watson	Lord Advocate; 1880–1881	Succeeded by John Blair Balfour
