= Charles Cowan =

British politician

- Born: 7 June 1801; Crail, Fife
- Died: 1889 (aged 87-88); Scotland
- Occupations: Paper-maker (1819–1847); Edinburgh MP (1847–1859)

Charles Cowan FRSE (7 June 1801 – 1889) was a Scottish politician and paper-maker.

== Life ==
He was born in Charlotte Street in Edinburgh on 7 June 1801, the son of Alexander Cowan, papermaker and philanthropist, and Elizabeth Hall, daughter of George Hall a merchant in Crail in Fife. He was the eldest of eleven children, eight of whom survived until adulthood. He was educated at Penicuik Parish School 1806-11 and then the High School in Edinburgh. He then attended university both in Edinburgh (1814–17) and Geneva (1817-18).

He then followed his father into the paper-making industry.

He wrote the article on papermaking for the Encyclopædia Britannica. In May 1819, he was sent to learn the papermaking trade at St Mary Cray, Kent, where he worked at either Lay's or Hall's mill on the River Cray.

In the general election of June 1847, he ran as a Radical free-trade candidate in Edinburgh, defeating the incumbent Whig Thomas Babington Macaulay. His initial election was declared null and void due to his being a party to a government contract, but he was re-elected in a second election that December. He was re-elected in the 1852 election in second place on the ballot, and returned unopposed in the 1857 election. He did not stand in 1859, and retired from politics.

In 1863 he was elected a Fellow of the Royal Society of Edinburgh. He then lived at Mount Grange a large house in the Grange on the south side of Edinburgh.

He died at Wester Lea, a villa in Murrayfield, Edinburgh on 29 March 1889.

== Family ==
He married Catharine Menzies (d.1871) in 1824.

== Other accomplishments ==
- In 1838 he founded the Royal Caledonian Curling Club
- For the year 1864-65 he served as president of the Royal Scottish Society of Arts

Parliament of the United Kingdom
| Preceded by William Gibson-Craig; Thomas Babington Macaulay | Member of Parliament for Edinburgh; 1847–1859; With: William Gibson-Craig to 1852; Thomas Babington Macaulay 1852–56; Adam Black from 1856 | Succeeded by Adam Black; James Moncreiff |
