= Duncan McLaren =

Scottish politician

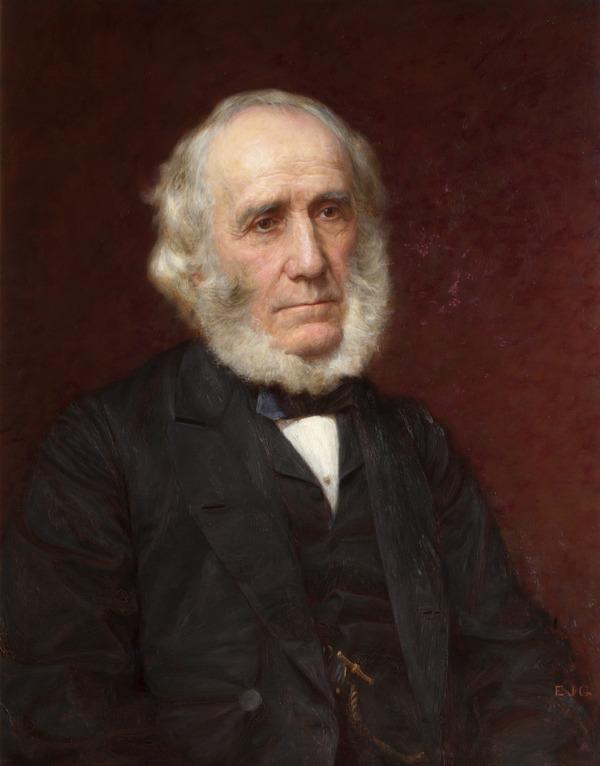
- Duncan McLaren by Edward John Gregory
- Born: 12 January 1800; Renton, Dunbartonshire, Scotland
- Died: 26 April 1886 (aged 86); Edinburgh, Scotland
- Spouses: Grant Aitken (m. 1829; died 1833) Christina Gordon Renton (m. 1836; died 1841) Priscilla Bright McLaren (m. 1848)
- Children: John McLaren, Agnes McLaren, Catherine McLaren, Charles McLaren, Helen Priscilla McLaren, Walter Stowe Bright McLaren

Duncan McLaren (12 January 1800 – 26 April 1886) was a Scottish Liberal Party politician and political writer. He served as a member of the burgh council of Edinburgh, after which he served as Lord Provost, then as a Member of Parliament (MP) for the Edinburgh constituency.

== Life ==
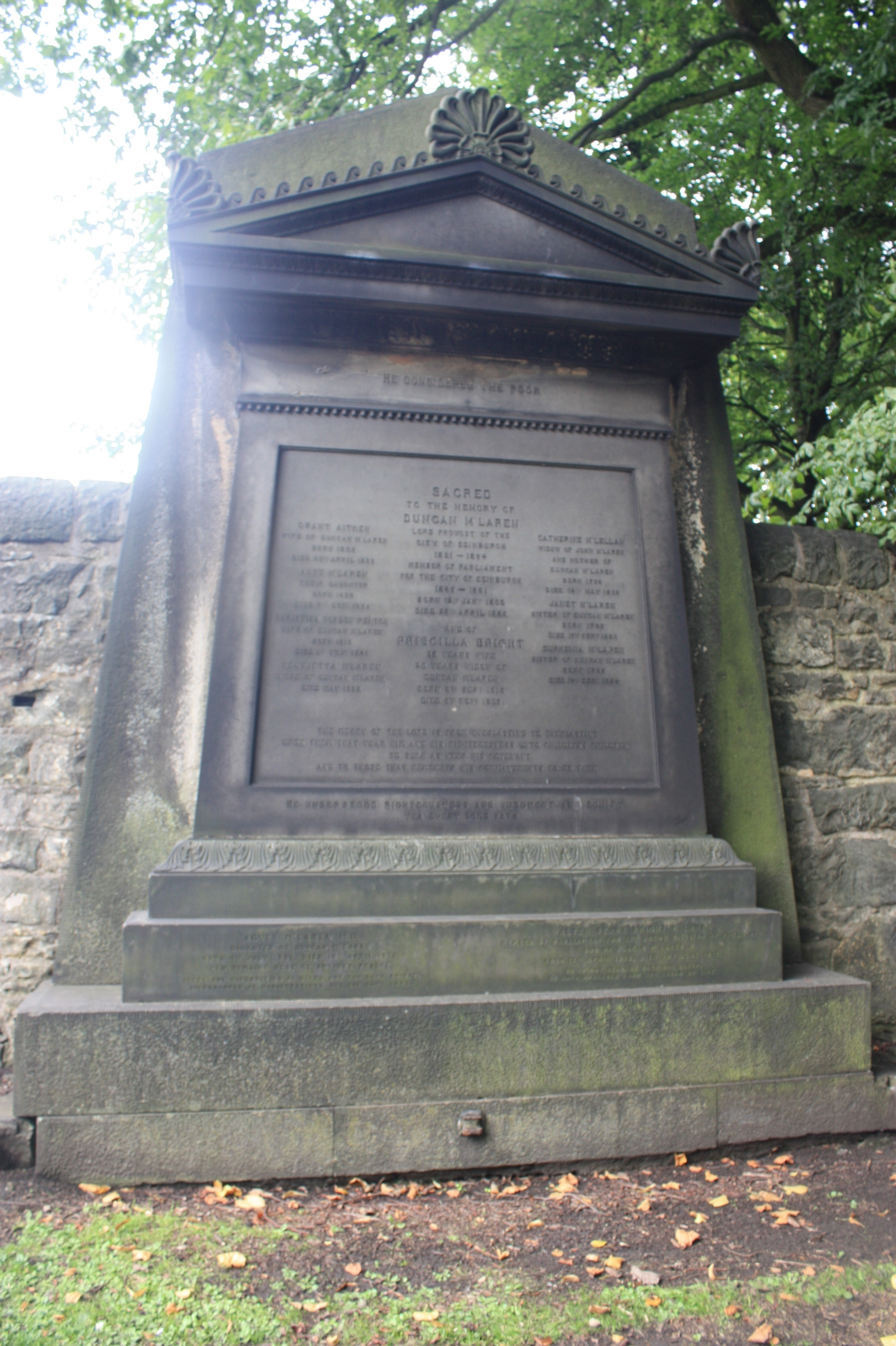
The McLaren monument at St. Cuthbert's Churchyard in Edinburgh

Born in Renton, Dunbartonshire, Duncan McLaren was the youngest of 10 children of John McLaren and Catherine McLellan. Apart from two years of schooling, he was self-taught. After school, he was apprenticed to a merchant in Dunbar. In 1824, he set up his own business as a draper in Edinburgh, growing the store into one of Britain's first department stores. In the 1830s, he headed the Scottish Central Board of Dissenters, established in 1834.

McLaren became a member of the town council in 1833. He became treasurer in 1837 and found that the royal burgh's finances were in ruin and that the Scottish capital was bankrupt. His work extricated Edinburgh from financial ruin. In 1835, he pioneered free education for all classes and started a building programme of thirteen schools.

He was elected Lord Provost of Edinburgh in 1851. McLaren was a Liberal and supported the anti–Corn Law campaign of John Bright, the opening of the Meadows to the public, and the establishment of the Industrial Museum (now the National Museum of Scotland). McLaren was also a governor of the Heriot Free School trust.

McLaren campaigned against the decision of the trustees of William Fettes to use his bequest to found a 'public school' on the English model, believing that to be a misuse of funds intended for the education of orphans and the needy. He sought unsuccessfully to have the Fettes project remodelled to create free schools on similar lines to those supported by the Heriot Trust.

In 1865 he was elected one of Edinburgh's two Members of Parliament, a position he held until he retired 16 years later. At Westminster he proved a conscientious and intelligent representative, and acquired a position of so much authority on questions related to Scotland that he was called "Member for Scotland". He was then living in Newington House.

Duncan McLaren was married three times – the third being Priscilla Bright (sister of John Bright and Margaret Bright Lucas), whom he married in 1848, and they lived together in Newington House, Edinburgh, from 1852 until his death in 1886. He is buried (together with most of his family) in St. Cuthbert's Churchyard in the heart of Edinburgh. His huge monument lies against the east wall of the first south extension to the graveyard, immediately below Edinburgh Castle.

== Family ==
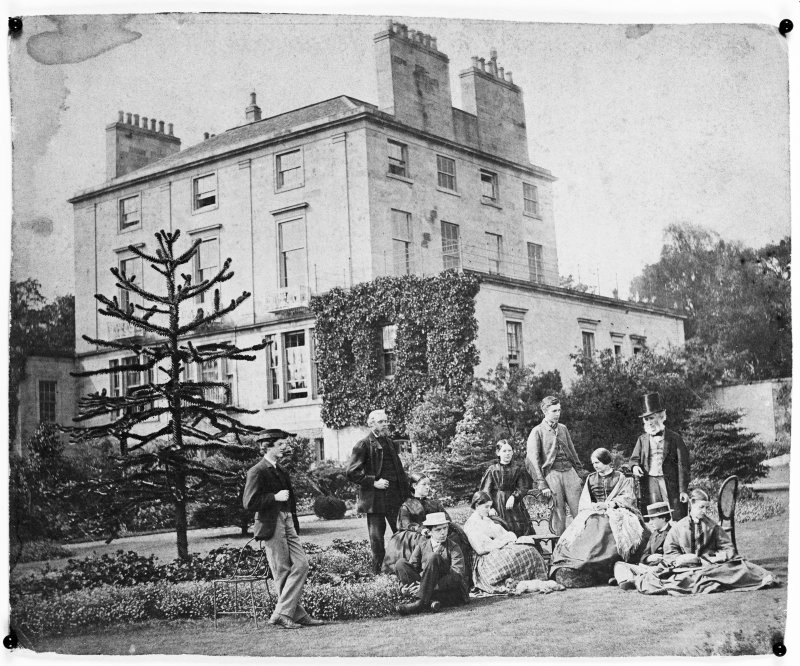
McLaren at Newington House in Edinburgh in 1880 with his third wife, Priscilla Bright, and his children

McLaren married three times.

Firstly, in 1829, he married Grant Aitken (1805–1833). Following her death he married Christina Gordon Renton (1813–1841). Finally, in 1848, he married Priscilla Bright (1815–1906), who outlived him by twenty years. All three wives are buried with him.

He was the father of John McLaren (son of his first wife), Agnes McLaren, Catherine McLaren (mother of F. S. Oliver) (with his second wife Christina Renton), and then Charles McLaren, Helen Priscilla McLaren, and Walter Stowe Bright McLaren (with his third wife Priscilla Bright McLaren).

== Artistic depictions ==
A full-length portrait of McLaren by George Reid RSA hangs in the Old Council Chamber (now called the Diamond Jubilee Room) within Edinburgh City Chambers.

Parliament of the United Kingdom
Preceded by Adam Black; James Moncreiff	Member of Parliament for Edinburgh; 1865–1881; With: James Moncreiff 1865–68; John Miller 1868–74; James Cowan 1874–81	Succeeded by James Cowan; John McLaren
