= Duncan Napier =

Scottish herbalist

Duncan Scott Napier
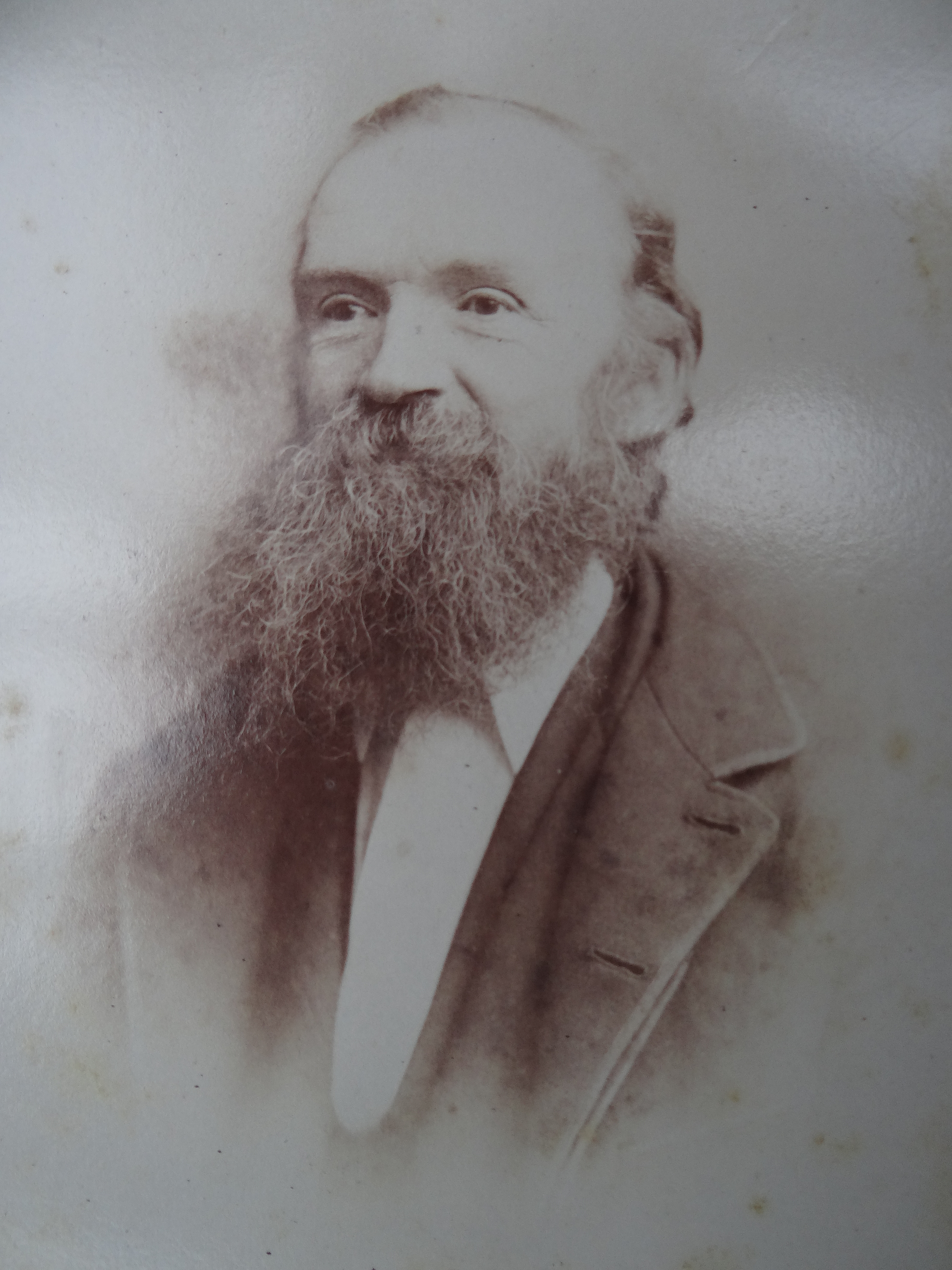
- Duncan Napier at age 60
- Born: 3 February 1831; Edinburgh
- Died: 9 March 1921 (aged 90)

Academic work
- Discipline: Botany
- Sub-discipline: herbalism

Duncan Scott Napier (3 February 1831 – 9 March 1921) was a Scottish botanist, herbalist and businessman. Despite having a deprived childhood and being functionally illiterate until his early teens, he became an expert in herbal remedies and did much to establish herbalism as a recognised branch of medicine. The herbalist business that he founded stayed in his family for three generations and still exists today.

== Early life ==
Much of what is known about Napier's early life is derived from two handwritten journals which he dictated towards the end of his life. Written in the third person, the journals contain an account of his life up the point at which he became established in business. Most of the information in the journals has been verified by recent research. (Note: Most of the journals' text is reproduced in Atkinson 2003 and Melvin 2021)

Duncan Napier was born in Edinburgh, Scotland in 1831, the illegitimate son of a widow who gave him up for adoption soon after his birth. Recent research into parish records and census returns has identified his mother as Helen Alexander (née Paterson), who owned a grocer's shop in Home Street, in the Tollcross district of Edinburgh.

Duncan was adopted by a publican, James Napier, who was probably his natural father. Napier ran a public house at Blackhall, but soon after Duncan's arrival, he took over the Crown Inn in Morningside. Duncan's early years were hard. He was physically abused by his adoptive mother, who was a heavy drinker and who probably resented the boy's presence in a household that already supported three young children. As a young boy, he was forced to work long hours in the pub. He received very little education, and was functionally illiterate until his early teens.

One of the customers at the Crown Inn was a farm worker named Andrew Nelson who worked for Sir George Clerk of Penicuik. Nelson "took a fancy" to Duncan, and arranged for him to spend three consecutive summers at the Penicuik estate. In his journal, Napier describes those days as "the brightest that had ever dawned on him." The journal also states that, while in Penicuik, he was baptised by the Rev. Duncan Scott, whose name he took. However no record exists of the baptism or of a minister of that name in Penicuik.

In 1846, Napier became apprenticed to a Mr Binnie, a baker in Coltbridge (then a small village on the western outskirts of Edinburgh), at a salary of "three pounds per annum and a pair of shoes". One of his duties was to deliver fresh bread and rolls to customers. It was on this early-morning bread round that he made the acquaintance of one of the customers, a Mr John Hope, a wealthy lawyer and noted philanthropist. A deeply religious man, Hope campaigned for education and total abstinence from alcohol among the poor of Edinburgh. He was shocked to hear that Napier could barely write, that he never went to church and that he drank beer rather than water. (Note: This was not unusual in Victorian times as water was often unclean.)

Hope became Napier's mentor and benefactor. It was under his influence that Napier became a pledged member of the British Temperance League and never again drank alcohol or used tobacco. He attended an evening class run by Hope, where he learned to write. Some time later, he joined Dr. Thomas Guthrie's Free Church (now St Columba's Free Church) in Johnston Terrace. He remained a committed Christian for the rest of his life.

In 1854 at the age of 23, Napier proposed marriage to Joan McKay, a 20-year old lady whom he had known in Coltbridge but who now lived in the west of Scotland. She accepted his proposal, despite the fact that the couple hadn't seen each other for six years. They were married at Airth, near Stirling in August 1854, and stayed together until her death in 1915.

== Career in herbalism ==
Napier's interest in herbalism started around 1858, when, browsing in a bookstall, he came across several issues of Brook's Family Herbal. This was an encyclopaedia of medicinal plants, originally published as a partwork. He bought all the issues available on the stall, and subsequently ordered the remaining parts by post.

One of the recipes in Brook's Family Herbal was for lobelia syrup, a traditional cough remedy. Napier had suffered from a chronic cough for many years, possibly from breathing flour dust in the bakery where he worked. He prepared the syrup according to the recipe, and took it every morning for six months. Although it caused him to vomit, it succeeded in curing his cough.

Encouraged by this success, he bought more medical and herbal textbooks, and experimented with various herbs, many of which he collected himself from sites around Edinburgh. One evening, while foraging near Craigmillar Castle, he got into a long conversation with a Mr. Haiskey, an Edinburgh herbalist of Polish extraction. Impressed with Napier's knowledge and enthusiasm, Haiskey proposed him for membership of the Edinburgh Botanical Society. By attending the society's weekly meetings, Napier became familiar with many more herbs and plants, and also made useful contacts among the society's members.

Word of Napier's skill as a herbalist quickly spread. Although still working as a baker, he was spending an increasing amount of time in treating sick people with his herbal remedies. In 1860, with financial help from John Hope, he opened a shop in a courtyard in Bristo Street to sell his herbal products. The shop was initially run by his wife, but as business increased, Napier decided to give up his job in the bakery and devote himself full time to the business. In 1874, the shop moved to larger premises nearby, at the corner of Bristo Place and Teviot Row. The shop remains on that site to this day, and is now Scotland's oldest herbal practice.

== Later life and death ==
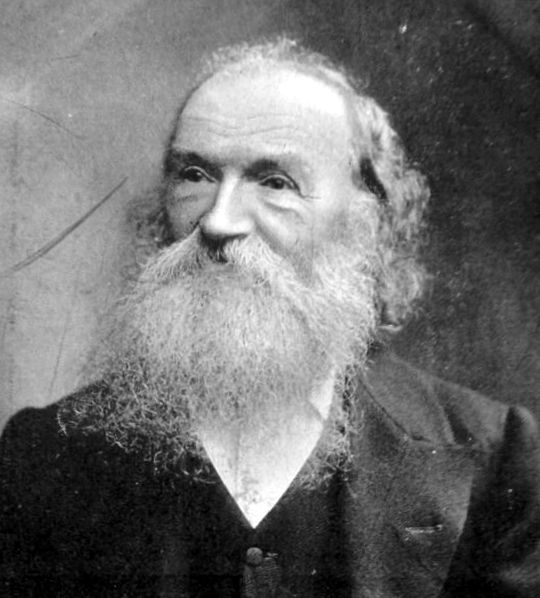
Duncan Napier at age 80

Napier continued to work in the business for the rest of his life. He worked very long hours, often rising before dawn to collect herbs and plants, returning in time to open the shop. As well as giving consultations to patients, he prepared all the remedies himself. This typically involved drying the herbs and making them into syrups, tinctures and ointments.

Napier was a leading member of the campaign to establish herbalism as a recognised branch of medicine. In 1864, he was a founding member of the National Association of Medical Herbalists, a forerunner of the National Institute of Medical Herbalists. This is still the oldest professional organisation for herbal practitioners in the UK, with members being recognised throughout the world. Its aims are to champion herbal medicine, promote the expertise of its members, safeguard the public and maintain standards.

In 1868, Napier qualified as a registered chemist and druggist. In 1869 he was elected as a member of the Medical Reformers of England. In 1889, he became a full member of the Pharmaceutical Society of Great Britain.

Duncan Napier had nine children, seven of whom survived to adulthood. In 1870, the family moved from a flat next to the shop in Bristo Street to a large newly built tenement flat in Gladstone Terrace in the Sciennes district of Edinburgh. In 1880, they moved to a still larger house in nearby Murray Street (now 5 Sciennes Gardens).

=== Anti-vaccination campaign ===
Napier was a vigorous campaigner against mandatory vaccination. The Vaccination Act 1853 had made smallpox vaccination compulsory for children, with defaulting parents liable to fines and imprisonment. There was widespread opposition to this law, with anti-vaccination leagues being set up throughout the country.

Napier (along with others) claimed that vaccination was itself causing the death of many children. (Note: This was probably because of infected needles.) His refusal to have his own children vaccinated led to his being prosecuted several times by Edinburgh's Medical Officer of Health, Henry Littlejohn. On one such occasion, Napier was fined ten shillings, with 23 shillings in costs. When he refused to pay, he was sentenced to seven days imprisonment but was released when the fine was paid by an unknown well-wisher.

Napier's refusal to have his own children vaccinated led to the death, in 1872, of two of his children from smallpox: first John (aged 6), and then, on the day of John's funeral, Duncan (aged 12). Two of his daughters also caught smallpox but survived.

=== Death ===
Duncan Napier died in 1921 at the age of 90. His grave is in the south-west section of the western extension of the Grange Cemetery.

== D. Napier & Sons ==
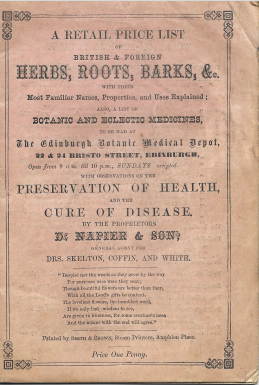
The cover of one of Napier's sales catalogue, issued in 1875

Three of Napier's sons joined him in the business. In 1870, his eldest son, Andrew (born 1856), joined the firm as a herbalist and stayed until his death in 1917. The fifth son, Duncan, known as Duncan Jnr (born 1879), (Note: Not to be confused with Napier's third son, also named Duncan, who had died of smallpox at the age of 5.) who was also a qualified herbalist, joined in 1900. In 1905, the business was formally constituted as D Napier and Sons.

When Duncan Jnr joined the army to fight in World War I, his place in the shop was taken by his brother Walter (born 1872). Andrew's daughter, Eva (born 1886; later Mrs Eva Gemmill) joined the staff in 1917. After Andrew's death in 1917, Duncan Jnr ran the business until his own death in 1956, despite being badly disabled by a gas attack while fighting on the Western Front.

The last of the Napier family to run the firm was Duncan Jnr's second son, John ("Jack") Napier (born 1914). Like his father and grandfather, John was a qualified herbalist, having served an apprenticeship as a chemist and obtained a qualification from the School of Pharmacy at the University of Edinburgh. At one point, he was one of only four qualified herbalists in Scotland.

After John Napier's death in 1978, his wife Kathleen Napier (née Maclean) took over the retail side of the business, but as she was not a qualified herbalist she was unable to give consultations or make up the herbal products. Napiers then came under the control of the firm of Gerard House Ltd., who ran it as a health food shop. It was then acquired by Jan de Vries, a Dutch naturopath who owned a chain of health food shops that still bears his name. de Vries re-established the consulting side of the business, reviving many of Napier's originally recipes.

In 1988, de Vries invited Dee Atkinson to join Napiers as the resident herbalist. Atkinson had studied herbal medicine at the College of Phytotherapy in Tunbridge Wells. In 1990, she took over the retail shop, thus re-uniting the two sides of the business. In November 2021, the company was purchased by e-commerce group Samarkand, who announced their intention to expand the business.
