= Emerson College of Herbology =

Herbal medicine school in Montreal, Quebec, Canada

Emerson College of Herbology was one of the first schools of Herbal Medicine founded in North America. This college taught the science of Herbology. It was based in Montreal, Quebec, Canada. The college offered Bachelor of Science and Master of Herbology, M.H., degrees to its student body. The M.H. program usually lasted 2–3 years. Graduates of the college are prominent in the world of homeopathic medicine.

== History ==
The history of Emerson College of Herbology can be traced back to 1888. In this year, Max Thuna immigrated from his native Austria to New York City. Thuna was a Master Herbalist and opened his first herbal store in New York City soon after his arrival. Thuna eventually relocated to Canada and went on to open twenty-five herbal shops across the country.

Following in his father's footsteps, Jack Thuna became a Master Herbalist and a practicing Homeopathic Doctor. He founded Emerson College of Herbology in the mid-1950s in order to spread his families understanding of the natural healing elements of herbs to others. The course of study was offered primarily via a correspondence format when it operated from Thuna's, Pointe-Claire, Quebec clinic. He eventually moved from this clinic and rented the ground floor of a large multi story building in Montreal; located at 11 Street. and Catherine Street East, in downtown Montreal. From there he ran a large wholesale herbal sales operation and established the new home of Emerson College of Herbology.

With the additional room afforded by the new location, Thuna was able to offer a more diverse program of study in Herbology. By 1977 Thuna and C.C. Bell were able to provide classroom instruction. In addition, they instituted the requirement of writing of a thesis for students who wished to explore the science of Herbology to greater depths, and graduate from the college. Because the wholesale herb business was housed at this location, the students were able to examine and work with specimens of medicinal plants, gaining greaterm insight into the science of Herbology.

During this period, upon graduation, the college began offering a transcript of courses taken and grades received. This was because Thuna felt that some of the courses may be accepted in transfer at traditional schools of medicine.

In 1978 Robert Mohr Wyndham, an alumnus of the college, began serving as a consultant chemist to the college's advanced program. He served in this position until late in 1980. At this time, Thuna, who was then eighty-four years old, notified him that he would no longer be able to offer the advance program of Herbal education due to his failing health. Emerson College of Herbology closed its doors in 1992. The family now has a Canadian-based company offering herbs.

== See also ==
- American Herbal Products Association
- National Institute of Medical Herbalists
