= David Chalmers (disambiguation) =

David Chalmers is an Australian philosopher.

David Chalmers may also refer to:

- David Chalmers (Scottish industrialist) (1820–1899)
- David B. Chalmers Jr. (born 1953), American owner of an oil refining company
- David Mark Chalmers (1927–2020), American historian
- David Chalmers (footballer, born 1891) (1891–1920), Scottish football centre forward
- David Chalmers (footballer, born 1897) (1897–1961), Scottish football inside forward
- David Chalmers, Lord Ormond (1530–1592) Scottish judge and historian and figure of the Scottish Reformation
