= Journal of Herbal Medicine =

- Discipline: Herbal medicine
- Language: English
- Edited by: Barbara Pendry

Publication details
- History: 2011–present
- Publisher: Urban and Fischer
- Frequency: Quarterly

Standard abbreviations
- ISO 4: J. Herb. Med.

Indexing
- ISSN: 2210-8033 (print); 2210-8041 (web)

Links
- Journal homepage

The Journal of Herbal Medicine is a quarterly peer-reviewed medical journal that covers research on herbal medicines. It is an official journal of the National Institute of Medical Herbalists and was established in 2011. The editor-in-chief is Barbara Pendry (National Institute of Medical Herbalists) and it is published by Urban and Fischer. The journal is abstracted and indexed by EMBASE/Excerpta Medica and Scopus.
