= Sir John Cowan, 1st Baronet, of Beeslack =

Escutcheon of the Cowan baronets of Beeslack

Sir John Cowan, 1st Baronet (1814–1900) was a Scottish industrialist and Liberal Party activist.

== Life and career ==
He was born in Edinburgh, son of Alexander Cowan and his wife Elizabeth Hall, and brother of the politicians Charles Cowan (1801–1889) and James Cowan (1816–1895). He was educated at Edinburgh High School, and attended the University of Edinburgh and University of Bonn.

Cowan worked in the family business, the Valleyfield paper mill at Penicuik. In due course it traded as Alexander Cowan & Sons, and Cowan became its manager. He was also chairman of the London and Edinburgh Shipping Company.

== Midlothian campaign ==
Cowan, as chairman of the Midlothian Liberal Association, was a significant figure in the Midlothian campaign of 1878 to 1880. While the Earl of Rosebery and William Patrick Adam were behind the idea, Cowan chaired the local constituency meetings and invited Gladstone to stand for Midlothian, with Gladstone accepting at the beginning of 1879. Cowan followed through in autumn 1879 with invitations to address public meetings. As a loyal supporter, Cowan stayed with Gladstone through the period of the Government of Ireland Bill 1886, and his baronetcy of 1894 recognised his services.

== Benefactor ==
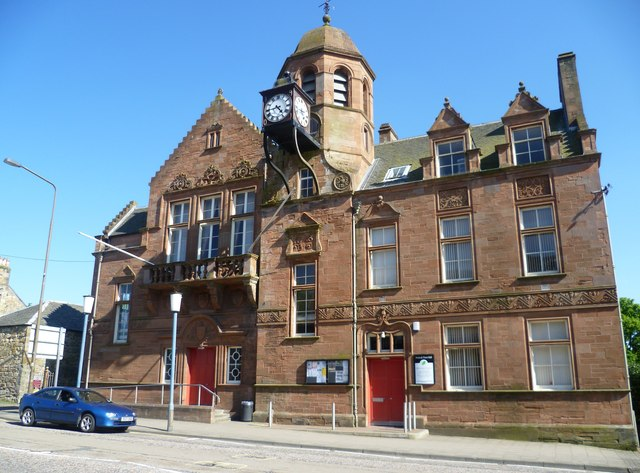
Penicuik Town Hall, 2012 photograph

The Cowan Institute, now Penicuik Town Hall, was built by a fund set up by the Cowan family business while John Cowan was manager.

== Family ==
Cowan was twice married, and was survived by two daughters. He left no heir to the baronetcy, which became extinct on his death in 1900. Those daughters were:

- Elizabeth Hall Cowan (born 1853), married in 1881 Charles Henry Sanford of the Scots Guards.
- Jean Elizabeth Baillie Cowan (born 1854), married in 1885 Lupton Topham Topham of Middleham House, Yorkshire.

== Notes ==
Baronetage of the United Kingdom
| Preceded by Burne-Jones baronets | Cowan baronets of Beeslack; 12 May 1894 | Succeeded by Montagu baronets |
