= John Hope (lawyer) =

Scottish lawyer, philanthropist and campaigner

John Hope W.S.
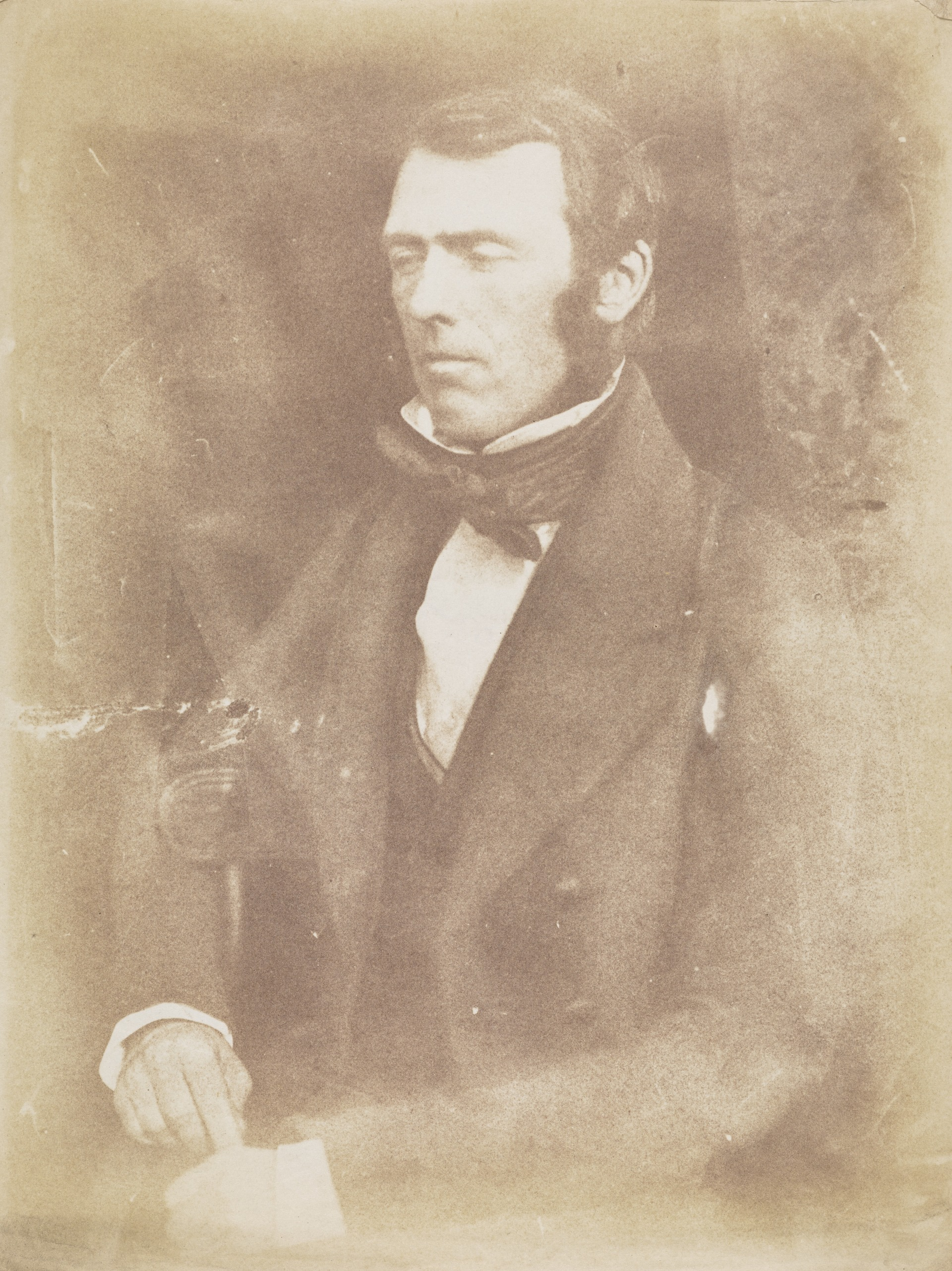
- Born: 12 May 1807; Edinburgh, Scotland
- Died: 25 June 1893 (aged 86); Edinburgh, Scotland
- Resting place: Greyfriars Kirkyard, Edinburgh
- Education: Royal High School, University of Edinburgh
- Occupation: Lawyer
- Known for: Religious and temperance campaigns

John Hope (12 May 1807 – 25 June 1893) was a Scottish lawyer, philanthropist and campaigner. A man of considerable wealth, he devoted much of his life to improving the conditions of working-class people in his native city, mainly by providing education and encouraging abstinence from alcohol. He was a leading member of the anti-Catholic movement that was widespread in Britain at the time. On his death, he bequeathed his entire estate to a charitable trust that exists to this day.

== Early life and education ==
John Hope was born in Edinburgh, Scotland on 12 May 1807 to James Hope and Jane Walker. His father was a lawyer and a colonel in the Volunteer Corp. His mother was a member of the prominent Walkers of Dalry family, which owned Dalry House, where John was born. His paternal grandfather was Professor John Hope, the Regius Keeper of the Royal Botanic Garden Edinburgh.

John Hope was educated at Edinburgh's Royal High School and the University of Edinburgh, but did not obtain a degree. He studied law while working in his father's law firm and in 1828 was admitted to the Society of Writers to the Signet. On the death of his father, he became a partner in the legal practice of his younger brother, James, the partnership lasting until 1864.

He was founder of the Foot-Ball Club in 1824, considered to be the world's first club dedicated to playing football, and ran the club until 1841.

In his early thirties, Hope began the campaigning, evangelical and philanthropic activities which would occupy the rest of his life. His professional earnings and inherited wealth had made him a wealthy man, and with no family to support he was able to devote considerable resources to his chosen causes.

== Temperance campaign ==
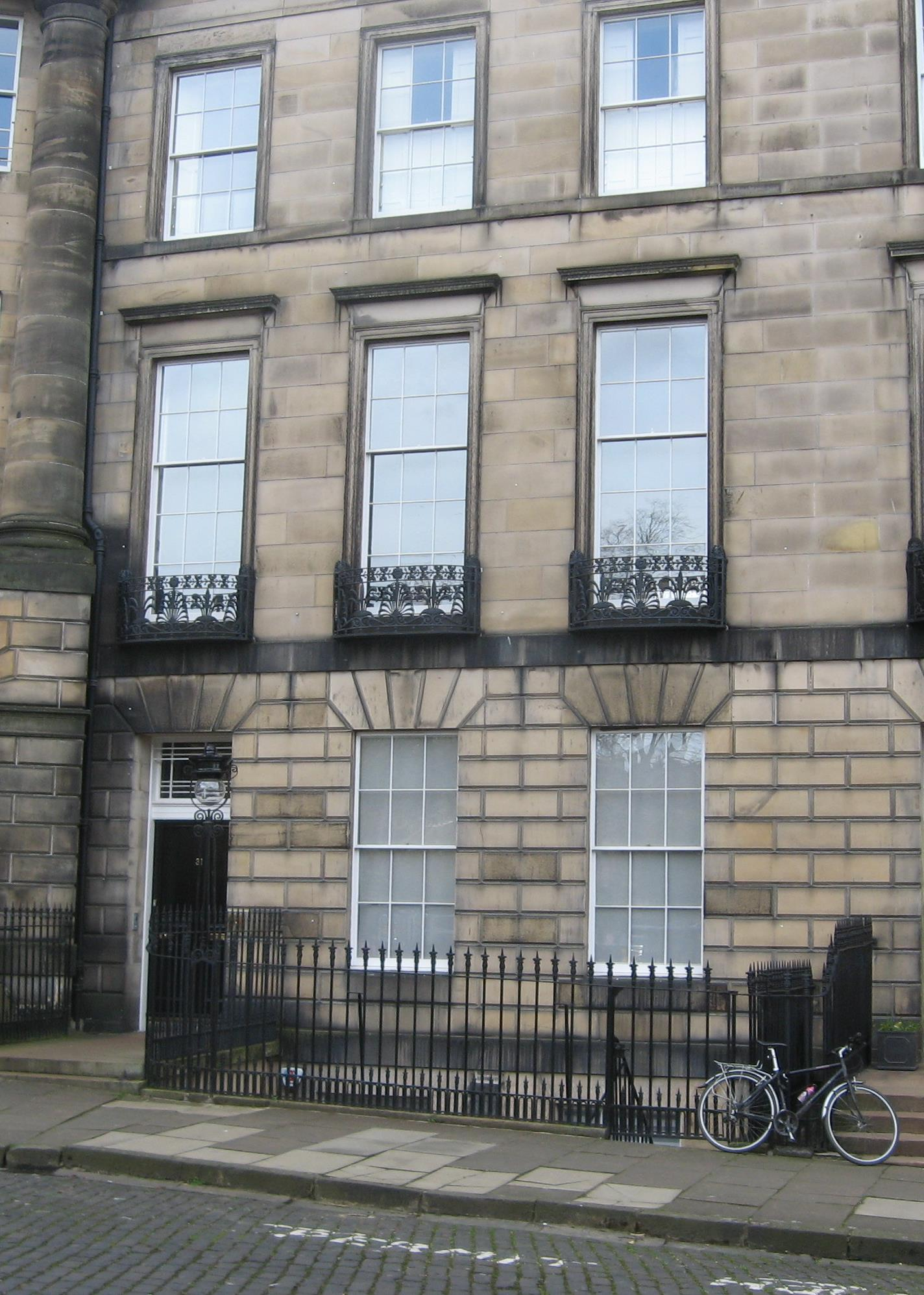
John Hope's house at 31 Moray Place, Edinburgh

From the mid-1840s, Hope campaigned vigorously for abstention from alcohol, especially among young people. In 1847 he founded the British League of Juvenile Abstainers to promote a teetotal culture among children. Under the League's auspices, he organised and financed free evening classes for young working-class men and women who might not otherwise have had access to education, at a cost to himself of some £3,000 per year. He used the classes to preach the benefits of abstention from alcohol and tobacco. By the time of Hope's death, some 30,000 people had passed through these classes.

In July 1851, he organised a huge rally in Holyrood Park which attracted about 20,000 children and 3,000 adults from all over Scotland to demonstrate their support for the temperance movement.

One of those attending Hope's classes was Duncan Napier, who was at the time an illiterate apprentice baker. With Hope's support and guidance, Napier went on to become a distinguished botanist and herbalist, and, with financial help from Hope, founded a herbalist business that remained in his family for three generations. After attending Hope's classes, Napier abstained from alcohol and tobacco for the rest of his life.

=== Rifle Volunteers ===
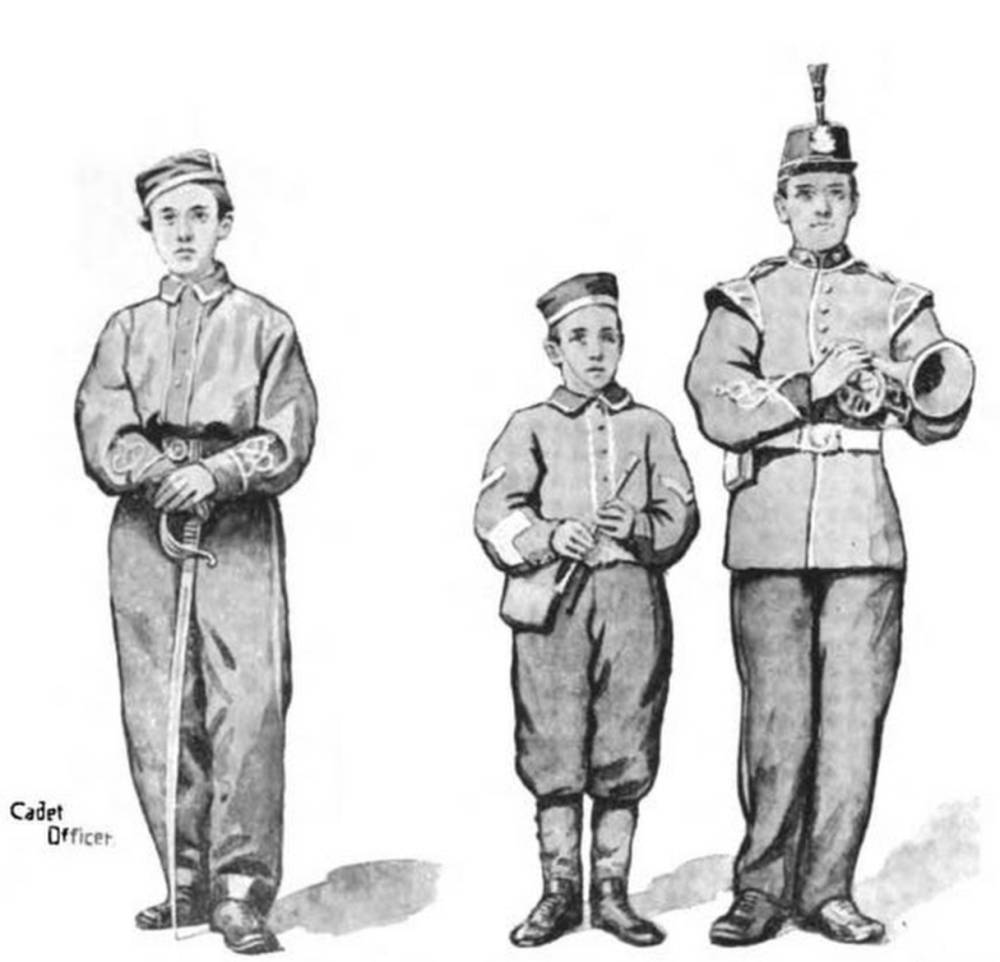
Cadets in John Hope's Rifle Volunteers

In 1859, Hope raised the No. 16 Abstainer Company of the Edinburgh Rifle Volunteers. These volunteers were part-time soldiers, recruited to supplement the regular British Army in times of need. Members of the No. 16 Abstainers were required to sign a pledge, promising to abstain from drugs, tobacco and alcohol. In 1867, the No. 16 Company became part of the enlarged 3rd Edinburgh Rifle Volunteers under Hope's command. Known as "Hope's Corp", the 3rd Edinburgh was also run on temperance principles.

Hope also formed the British League Cadets, nicknamed the "Water Rats", to provide future recruits to the volunteers. In July 1868, 250 cadets joined thousands of members of the Rifle Volunteers in a massive mock battle in Holyrood Park.

== Anti-Catholic movement ==
Another of the causes that occupied much of Hope's life was the promotion of Protestantism and the resistance to what he saw as the advances of the Roman Catholic church in Scottish life. This was against a background of a surge in anti-Catholic sentiment throughout Great Britain.

Hope played an active role in the formation of the Scottish Reformation Society, which saw itself as "a defender of British and Protestant liberties from the threats of Rome". In 1851, he helped organise a series of public meetings and lectures in Edinburgh, addressed by the noted anti-Catholic preacher, John Cumming, and by the Irish-born writer and cleric, Richard Blakeney.

Hope financed the publication of a number of Blakeney's anti-Catholic writings. He also published a monthly tract, The Banner of Truth, in which he preached his anti-Catholic views. He argued for an extension of the franchise, but only for Protestants, declaring that Catholics were unfit to vote because "they were not qualified to rule, not being civilly or religiously free, but in subjection to priests, bishops, and Pope."

== Edinburgh councillor ==
In 1857, Hope was elected to Edinburgh Council, representing the St. George's Ward, a position he held for thirty years. Although a Tory in his politics, he described himself as a "social reformer", actively supporting schemes for improving living and working conditions among the poor of the city.

According to his obituary in The Scotsman, "he was never a silent member [of the council]; and often he was rather difficult to get on with on account of his head-strong manner."

== Death and legacy ==
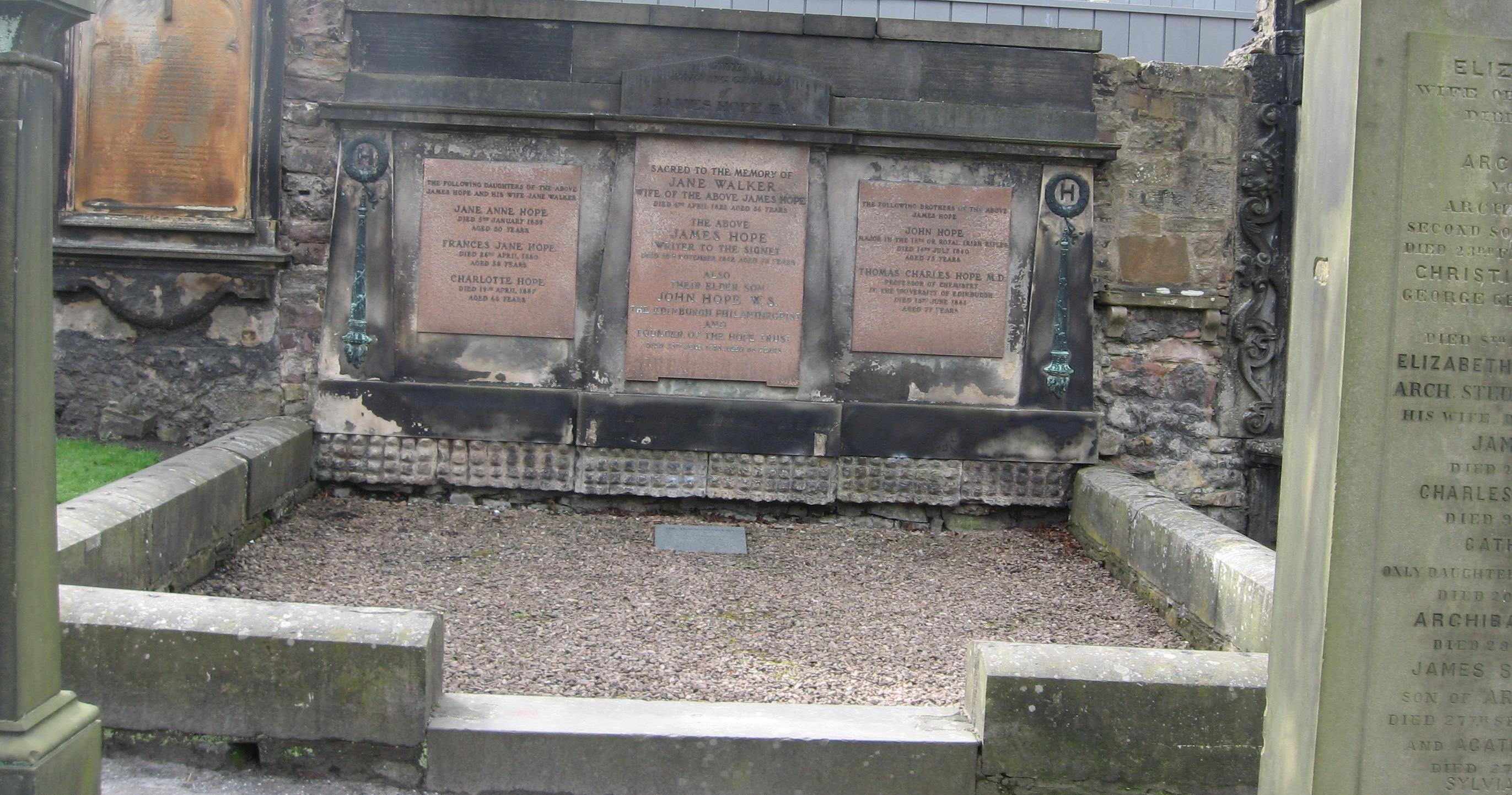
The Hope family tomb in Greyfriars Kirkyard.

Hope died on 25 June 1893 at his home, 31 Moray Place, Edinburgh. According to the death certificate, his death was "hastened by an accidental burn to his left foot". He was buried four days later in the family tomb in Greyfriars Kirkyard. Although his funeral was, at his request, kept private, a large number of people who were involved in his various religious and temperance organisations assembled in the churchyard to pay their respects.

Hope bequeathed his entire £400,000 estate to the Hope Trust, which he had set up three years earlier specifically to provide funds for anti-alcohol and anti-Catholic campaigns after his death. The bequest was challenged by some of Hope's relatives who had expected to benefit from his will. In a celebrated legal action, the relatives alleged that he had suffered delusions, as demonstrated by his attitudes towards alcohol and the Roman Catholic church. The case was eventually settled out of court, with the relatives receiving a total of £15,000 and agreeing to withdraw the allegations they had made regarding Hope's sanity.

The Hope Trust still exists. It was officially constituted as a charity in 1912. According to its Objects, its main roles are now "the promotion of temperance work and the combatting of all forms of substance abuse" and "promoting Reformed theology and Reformed church life especially in Scotland."
