= Campbell Douglas =

British architect (1828–1910)

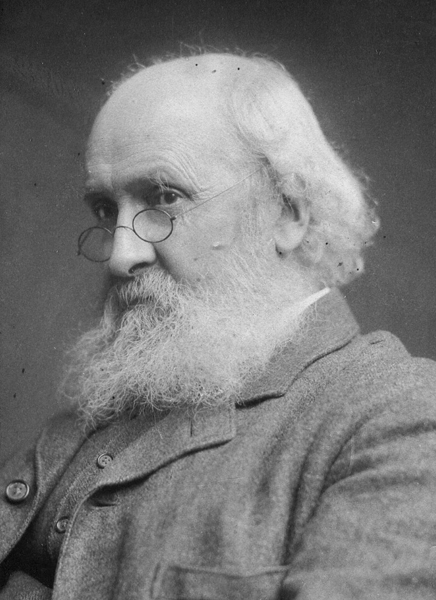
- Douglas c. 1900
- Born: Archibald Campbell Douglas; 14 June 1828; Kilbarchan, Scotland
- Died: 14 April 1910 (aged 81); Edinburgh, Scotland
- Education: University of Glasgow
- Occupation: Architect

Archibald Campbell Douglas (usually simply referred to as Campbell Douglas) (14 June 1828 – 14 April 1910) was a Scottish architect based primarily in Glasgow. He designed many churches in Glasgow and Edinburgh, especially those for the Free Church of Scotland.

He was three times President of the Glasgow Architectural Association and in 1891 was the Vice President of the Royal Institute of British Architects.

He was active in politics, and was a member of the Scottish Liberal Club, Glasgow Liberal Club and National Liberal Club (in London). He was also a Justice of the Peace in Argyllshire.

== Early life ==
Douglas was born at Kilbarchan in 1828, the son of Janet Monteath and the Rev. Robert Douglas, minister in the parish of Kilbarchan in Renfrewshire.

He attended the University of Glasgow at the age of 13.

In 1842, he was articled to John Thomas Rochead, architect, who was based in Glasgow.

In 1843, together with his father, they left the established Church of Scotland and joined the Free Church, following the Disruption of that year. This led to many later commissions. After a time in England he set up his own practice in Glasgow in 1855. It seems he may have had an office in Fife, where his brother Robert Douglas was an iron founder and engineer.

== Works ==
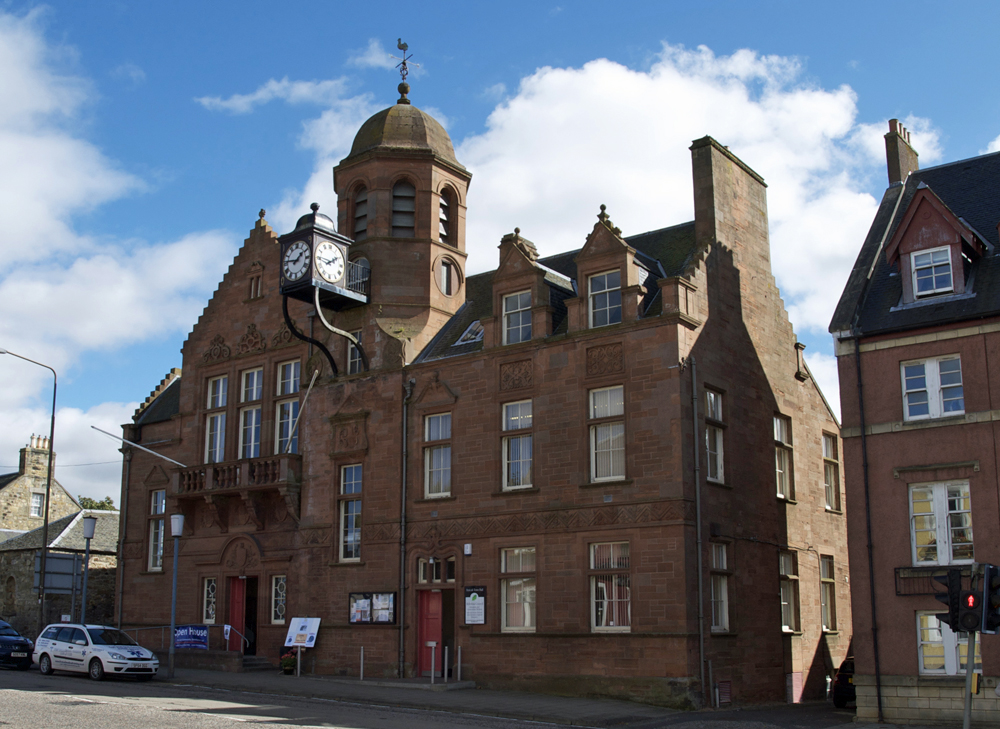
Penicuik Town Hall (formerly the Cowan Institute), designed by Campbell Douglas 1891

He came to early fame with the designs of Briggate Free Church in Glasgow and North Leith Free Church in Edinburgh. At this time he employed the talented draughtsman Bruce Jones Talbot.

In 1860 he took John James Stevenson (b.24 August 1831) into partnership and they set up office at 24 George Street in Edinburgh. This lasted until the death of Stevenson's father in 1866 at which point he inherited a large sum of money and drifted out of the profession.

From 1868 to his retiral in 1906 Douglas's principal office was in Glasgow where he and James Sellars formed the architectural firm of Campbell Douglas & Sellars which expanded to include large commercial. educational and municipal projects. During this period employees included Charles Alfred Chastel de Boinville, a talented Anglo-French architect, who brought a European flavour to the designs. Douglas helped Colin Alexander McVean, a chief surveyor of Japan's Public Works, to build first technical school building, later Imperial College of Engineering.

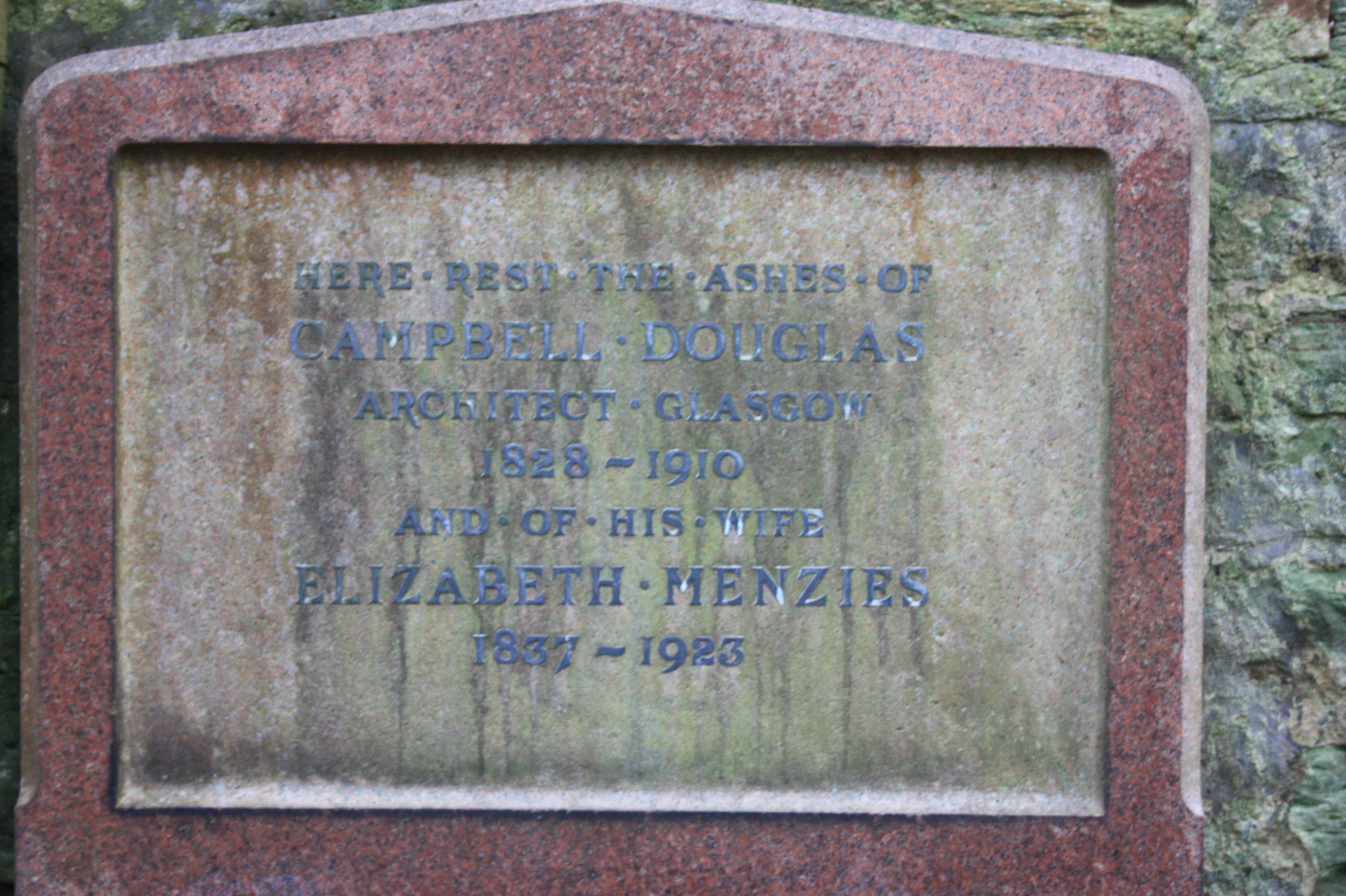
The grave of Campbell Douglas, Morningside Cemetery, Edinburgh

In 1865, he married Elizabeth Menzies, the granddaughter of Alexander Cowan. This led to his commission to build the Cowan Institute, now known as Penicuik Town Hall, in Cowan's memory.

In 1903 he merged with the much younger Alexander Nisbet Paterson to create "Campbell Douglas & Paterson", probably to give more kudos to the blossoming young architect.

He died of bladder disease in 1910, aged 81, at his house 25 Braid Avenue, Edinburgh, leaving the then-substantial sum of over £8,000.

He was cremated and his ashes were buried in Morningside Cemetery against the south wall, towards the south-west corner. His wife Elizabeth Menzies (1837–1923) lies with him.

== Trainees ==
- John Rhind
- James Sellars
- J. J. Stevenson
- Charles Alfred Chastel de Boinville

== Principal works ==
- Wallacetown Free Church, Ayrshire (1855)
- Alloway Parish Church (1855)
- Briggate Free Church, Glasgow (1857–1859)
- Invertiel Free Church, Kirkcaldy (1857)
- Millport Free Churcyh, Bute (1857)
- Brisbane Academy, Largs (1858)
- Lion St UP Church, Glasgow (1859)
- Corn Exchange, Cupar, Fife (1861)
- McDonald Mission Church, Cowcaddens, Glasgow (1861)
- Moulin Free Church, Pitlochry (1861)
- St Peters Mission Church, Glasgow (1861)
- Kelvinside Free Church (1862)
- Campsie Free Church (1863)
- Clola Free Church (1863)
- Kilbarchan Girls' School (1863)
- Reformed Presbyterian Church, Derry (1863)
- Greyfriars Church, Dumfries (1866)
- Cove Castle (jointly with James Sellars) (1867)
- Dunoon Pier and offices (1867)
- Episcopal Church and English Free Church, Campbeltown (1867)
- Monument to Dr John Alexander, Kirkcaldy Cemetery (1868)
- Scottish Amicable Insurance Offices, Glasgow (1870)
- Burnbank UP Church, Glasgow (1871)
- Stewart Memorial Fountain, Wellington Park, Kelvingrove (1871)
- Langholm Cottage Hospital (1872)
- Wesleyan Church, Claremont St, Glasgow (1872)
- Cowcaddens Free Church (1872)
- Dysart Free Church (1872)
- Crosshill Queen's Park Church, Glasgow (1872)
- St Enoch's Free Church, Partick (1873)
- Lenzie UP Church (1874)
- Cupar Free Church (1875)
- Belhaven UP Church and Mission, Glasgow (1875–1877)
- Blackfriars Park Church, Glasgow (1876)
- Kelvinside Academy (working with James Sellars) (1877)
- Finnieston Free Church, Kelvingrove (1878)
- Her Majesty's Theatre, Gorbals Street, Glasgow (1878) demolished.
- Milton Street School, Cowcaddens (1878)
- Anderston Free Church, Glasgow (1879)
- Glasgow Medical Mission, Calton, Glasgow (1879)
- Factory for Wylie & Lochhead, Charing Cross, Glasgow (1880–1883)
- Mission Hospital in Safed, Syria (now in Israel) (1880)
- Free Abbey Church, Dunfermline (1881)
- Sick Children's Hospital, Garnethill, Glasgow (1881)
- Pathhead Public Hall, Kirkcaldy (1882)
- Lochgoilhead Free Church (1883)
- Mugdock House (working with James Sellars) (1883)
- Sinclairtown Town Hall and Library, Kirkcaldy (1883)
- Glasgow Medical Mission, Gorbals, Glasgow (1884)
- Dysart Town Hall (1885)
- Mission Hospital, Tiberias in Israel (1885)
- Proudfoot Institute, Moffat (1885)
- St Andrews Free Church, Edinburgh (1886)
- Couper Institute, Cathcart, Glasgow (1887)
- Spiers School, Beith, Ayrshire (1887) (demolished 1984)
- St. Andrew's Church, Exeter Road, Bournemouth (1887)
- Anderson's College Medical School, now part of the University of Glasgow (1888)
- Greenock Baptist Church (1888)
- Hampstead Presbyterian Church (1888)
- Ayr Public Library (1891)
- Canaan House, Morningside, Edinburgh (1892) demolished
- Bridgend UP Church, Bridgend (1893)
- Penicuik Town Hall (formerly the Cowan Institute), Penicuik (1893)
- Inveraray Free Church (1895)
- Sandeman Library, Perth (1898)
- Milngavie Free Church and Hall (1896)
- Paisley Technical School (1896)
- UP Church, St John's Town of Dalry (1897)
- Kirkcaldy Burgh Infectious Diseases Hospital (1897)
- Factory for Barr & Stroud in Anniesland, Glasgow (1903)
- Lochboisdale Church, South Uist (1904)
- National Bank of Scotland, St Enoch's Square, Glasgow (1906)

== Gallery ==
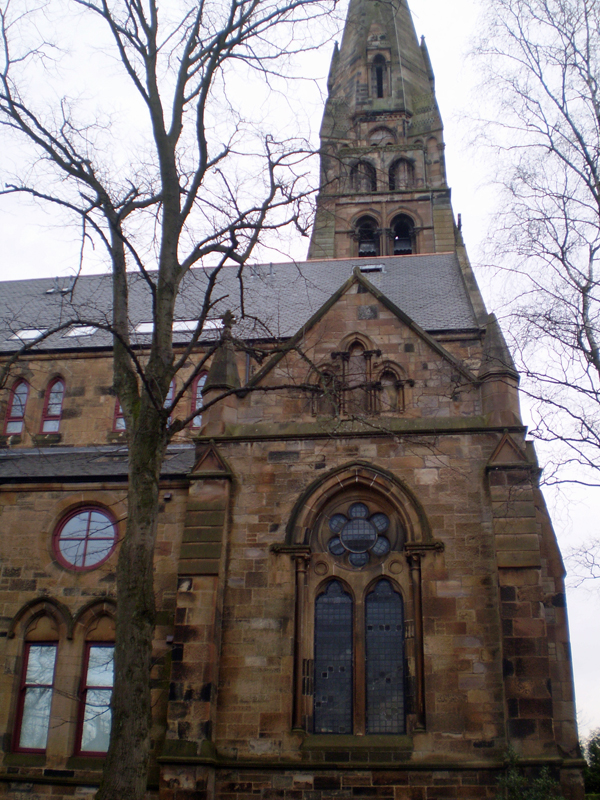
Queen's Park Church, Glasgow

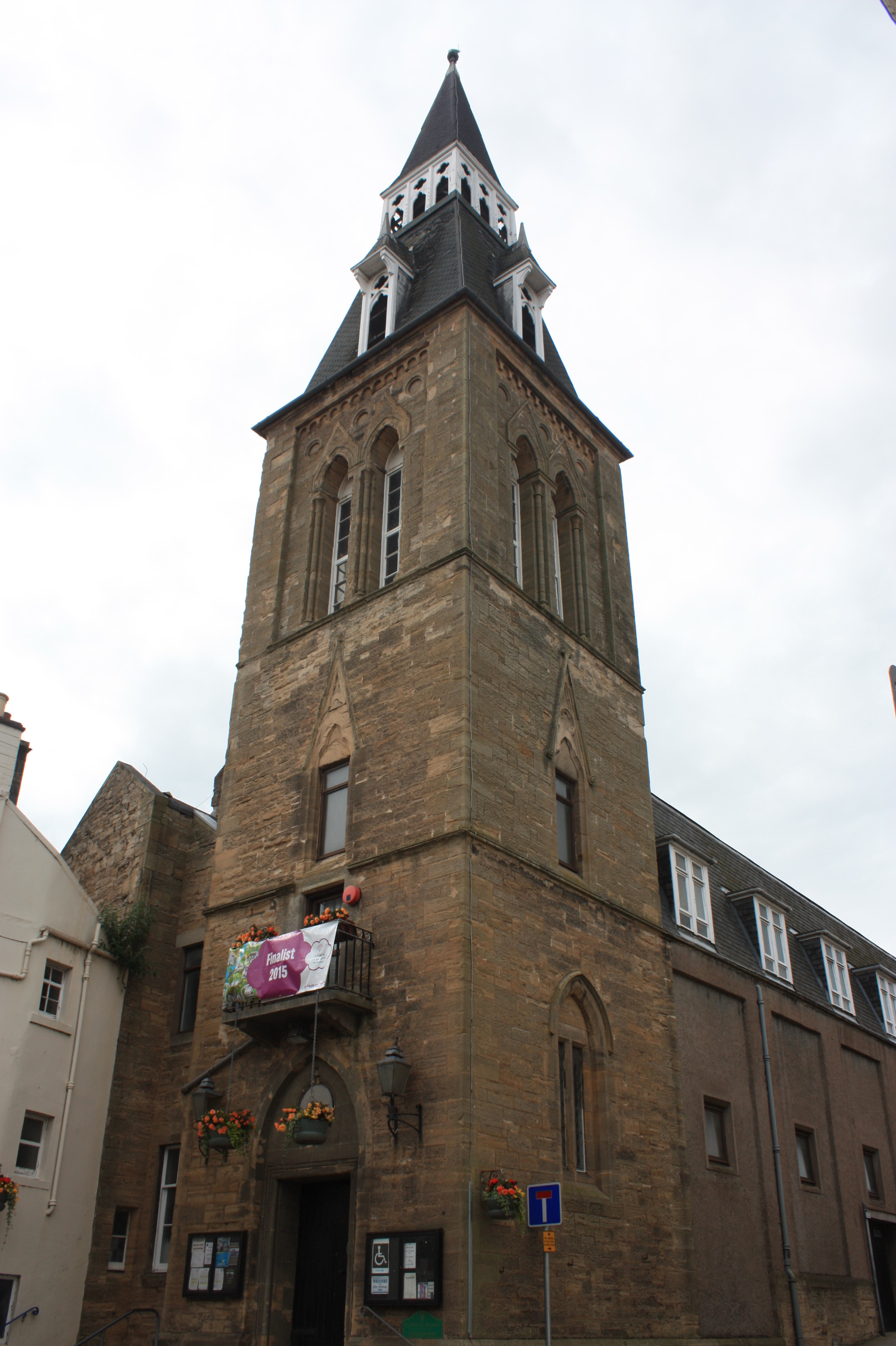
Cupar Corn Exchange

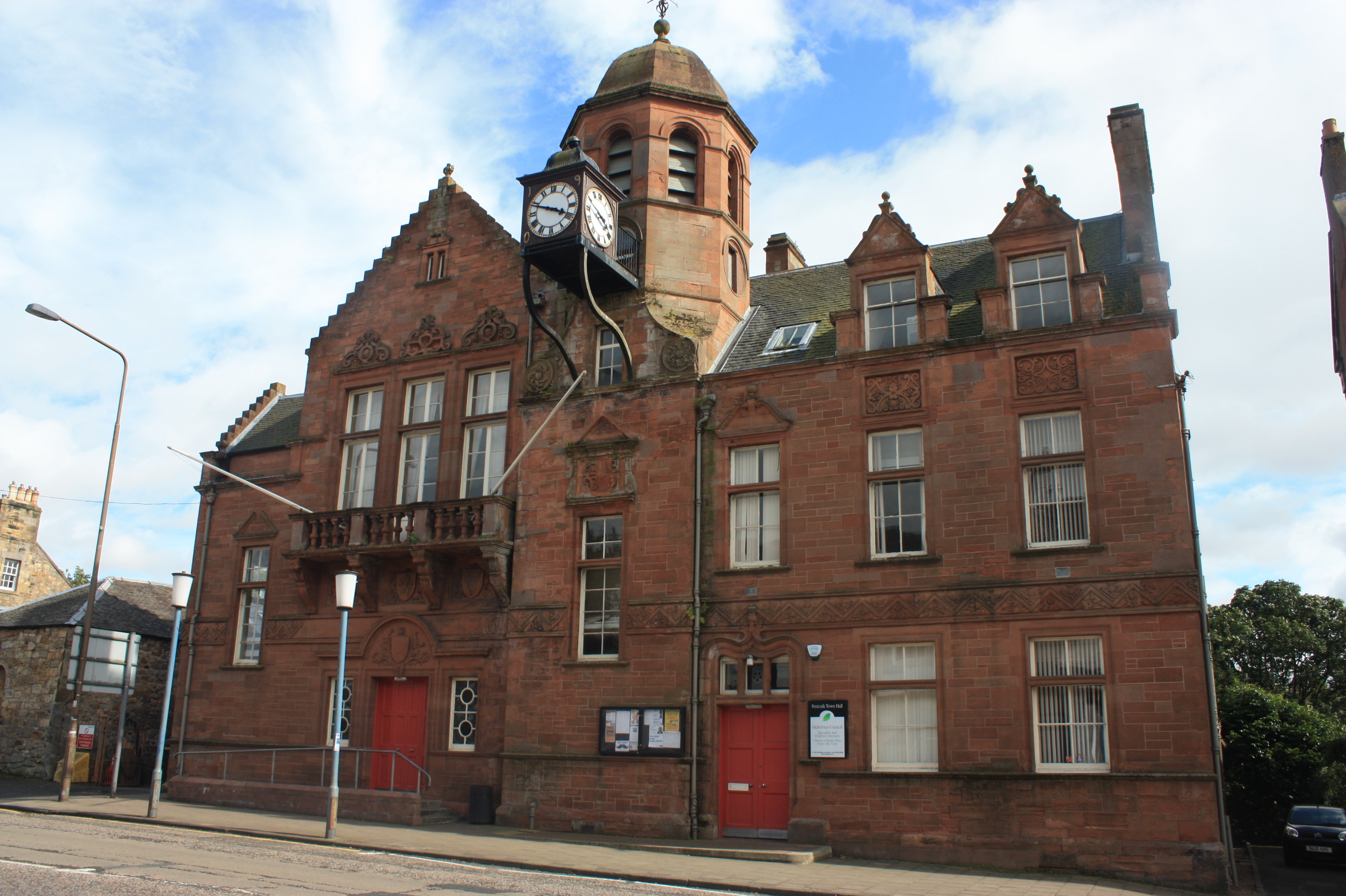
Penicuik Town Hall (formerly the Cowan Institute), Penicuik

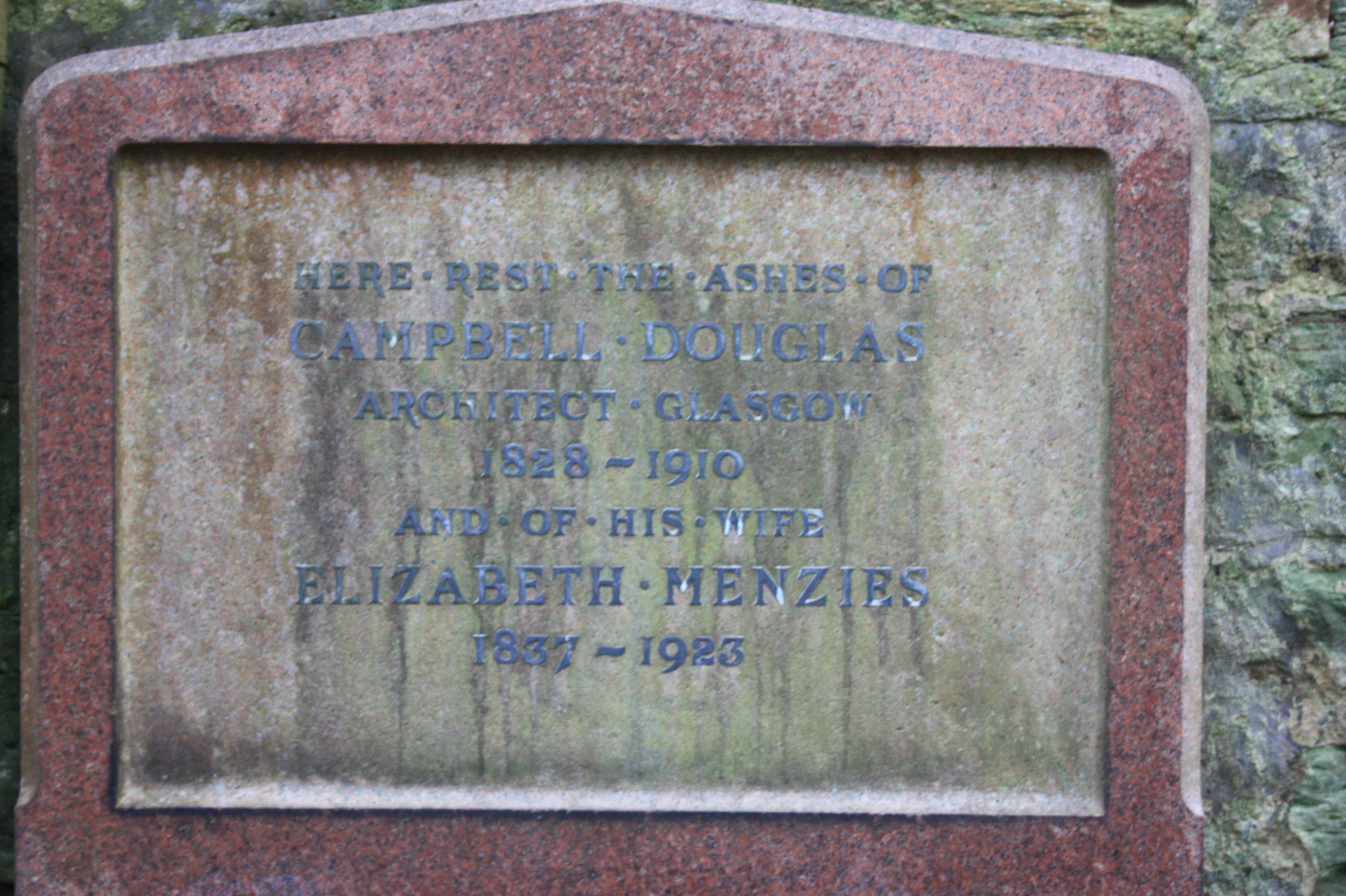
The grave of Campbell Douglas, Morningside Cemetery, Edinburgh

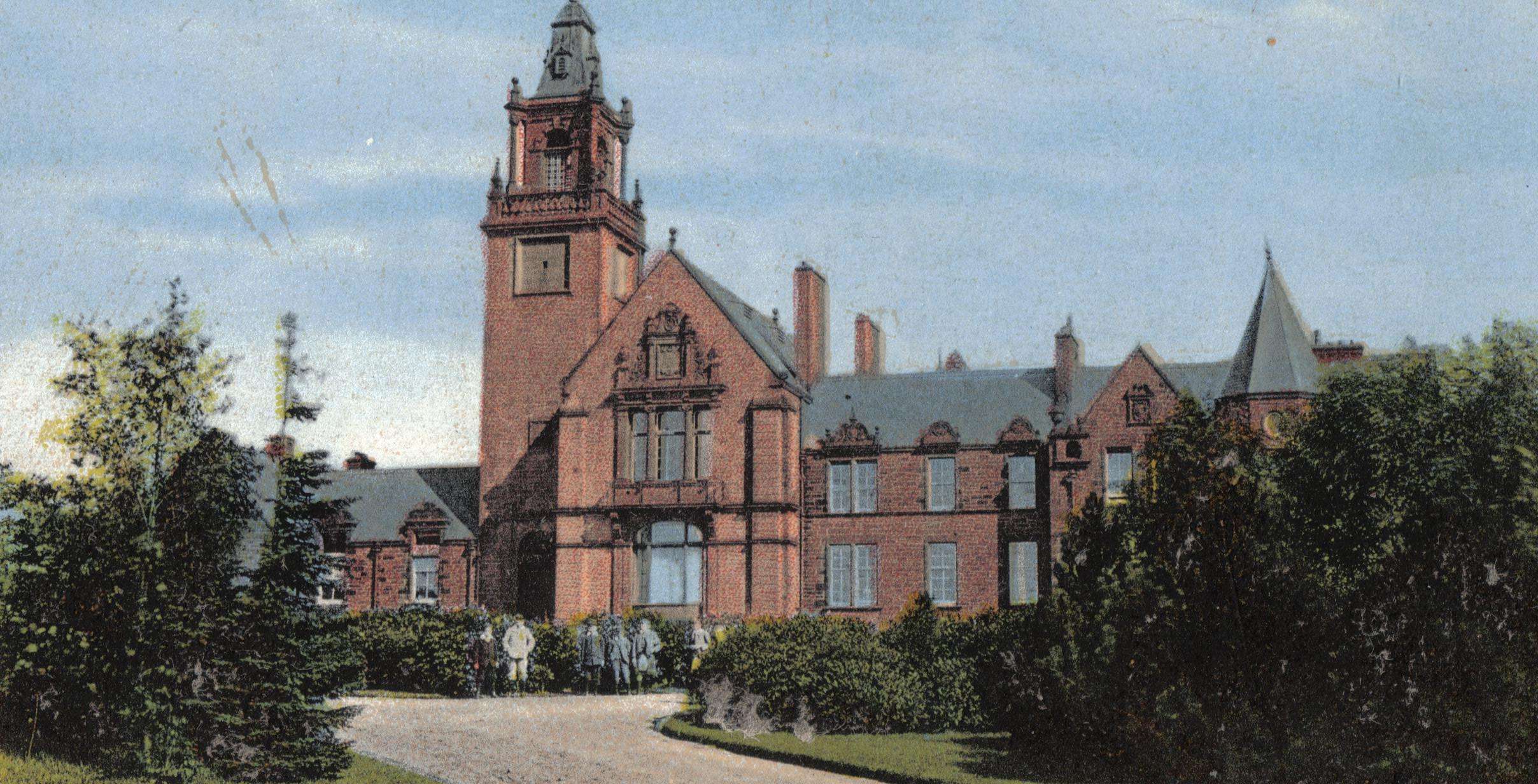
Spier's School
