= St. Andrew's Church, Exeter Road =

Church building in Bournemouth, England

Coordinates: 50.7193°N 1.8804°W

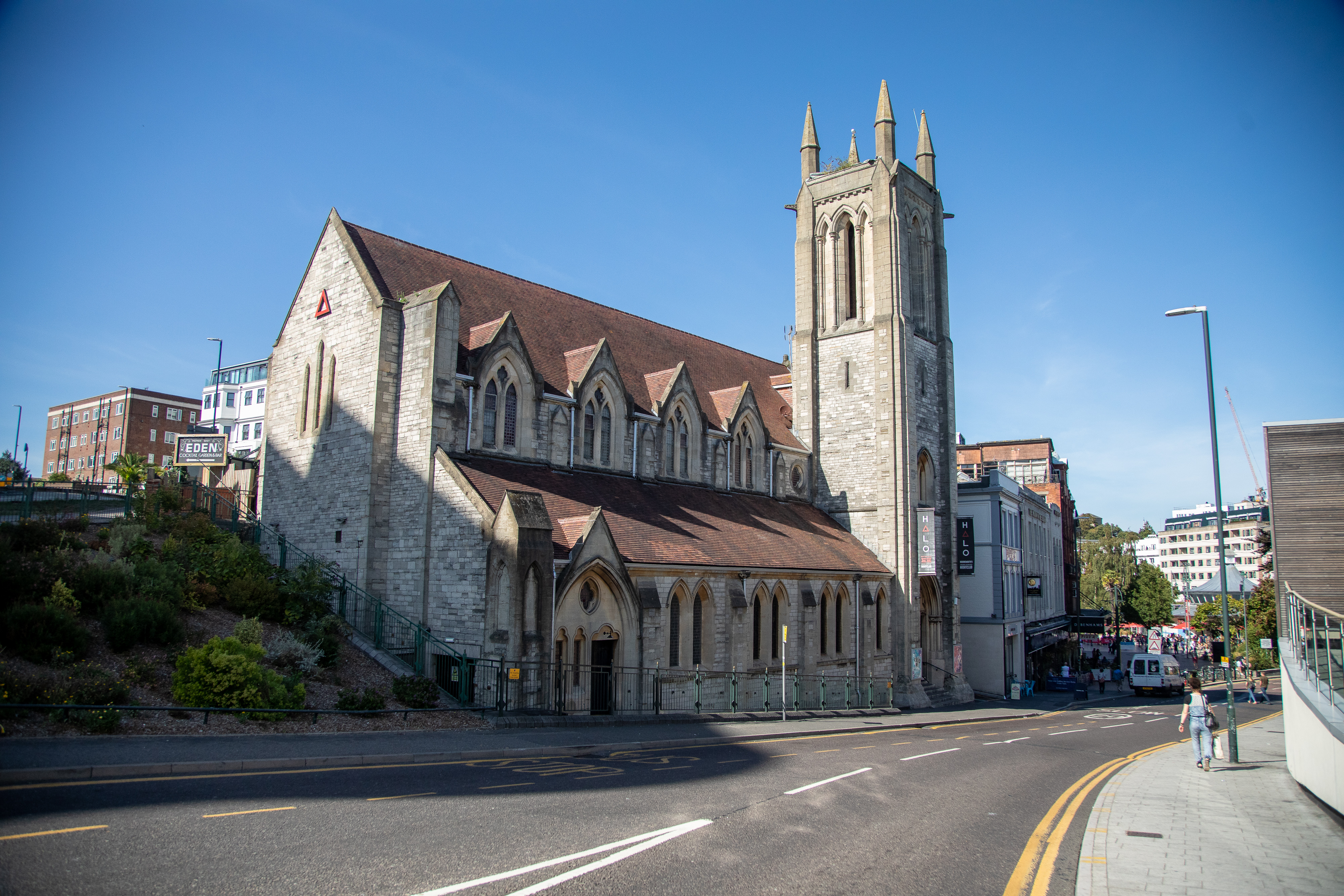
The Church of St Andrew in 2019 as Halo

St. Andrew's Church, Exeter Road was a United Reformed Church on Exeter Road in Bournemouth Town Centre. After May 2013, the building was occupied by the Halo nightclub.

== History ==
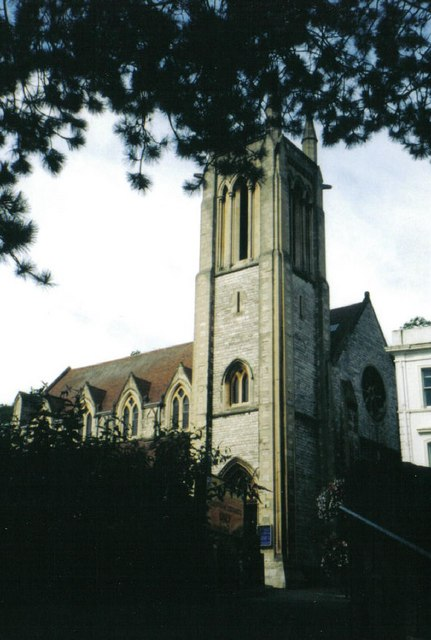
The tower of the former Church of St. Andrew in 2000

The church was built between 1887 and 1888, designed by Campbell Douglas and Sellars of Glasgow. In 1974, the church became a Grade II listed building. In 2020, the nightclub was refurbished. In March 2024 it was announced that the nightclub would be closing. On 2 May 2025, the club reopened as Sanctum.
