= Alexander Cowan =

Scottish papermaker and philanthropist (1775–1859)

- Born: 17 June 1775; Penicuik, Scotland
- Died: 13 February 1859 (aged 83)
- Occupation: Papermaker

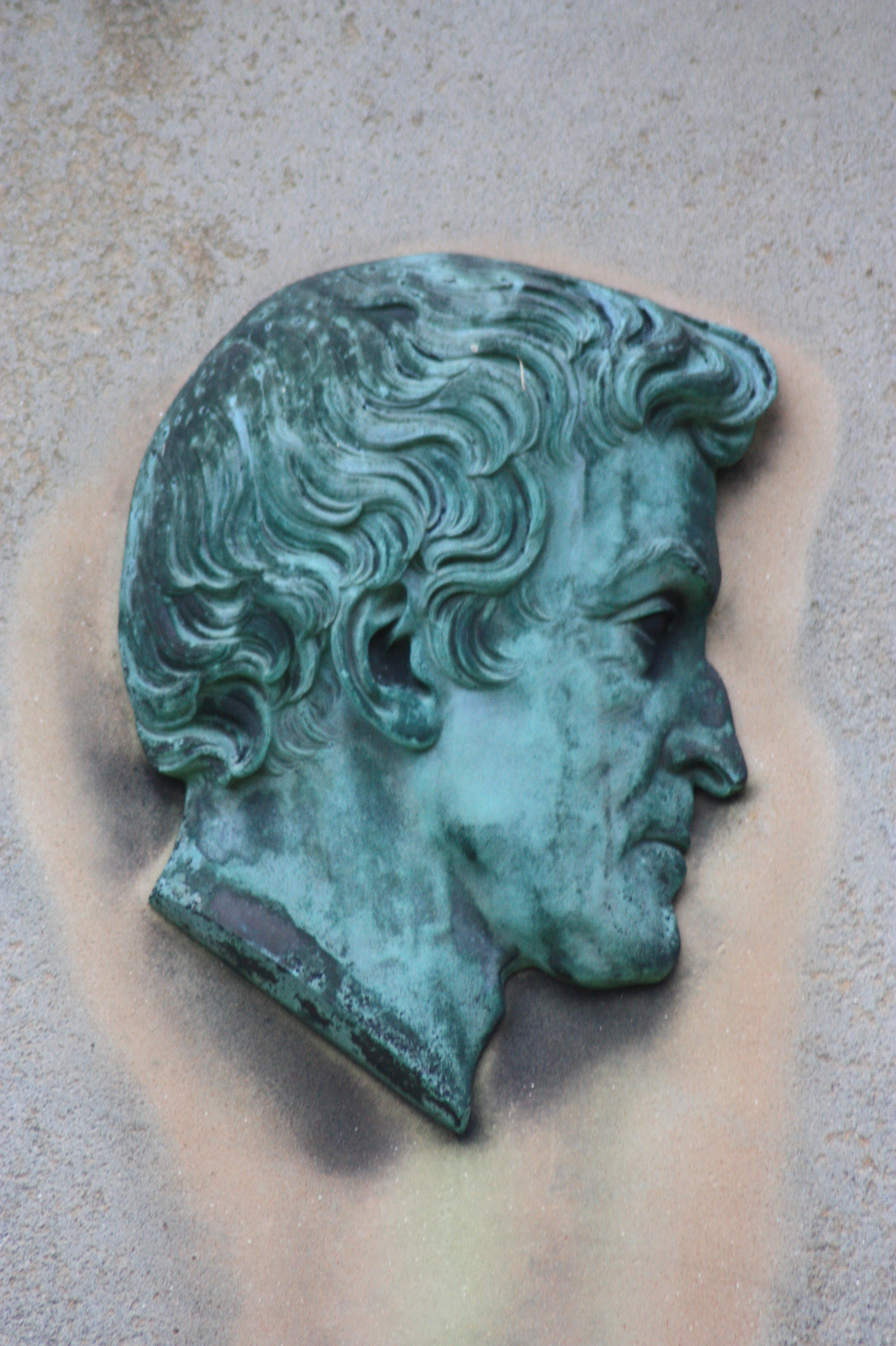
Portrait head of Alexander Cowan

Alexander Cowan (17 June 1775 – 13 February 1859) was a Scottish papermaker and philanthropist. He was the 13th child and third surviving son of Charles Cowan (8 June 1735 – 23 February 1805) and Marjory Cowan nee Fidler (16 July 1734 – 30 November 1819) He was also a cousin and friend of Thomas Chalmers, the prominent Scottish minister. Through his business he was a friend and associate of the publisher Archibald Constable and, through Constable, an associate of Sir Walter Scott. The Cowan Family owned the huge Valleyfield paper-works in Penicuik in Midlothian and Sir Walter Scott refers to Alexander's brother Duncan as "Honest Duncan the Paper Manufacturer" in The Fortunes Of Nigel. Alexander was a trustee who helped Sir Walter Scott out of Bankruptcy. He took over the running of the paper works when the Government sold it back to the family in 1820.

== Life ==
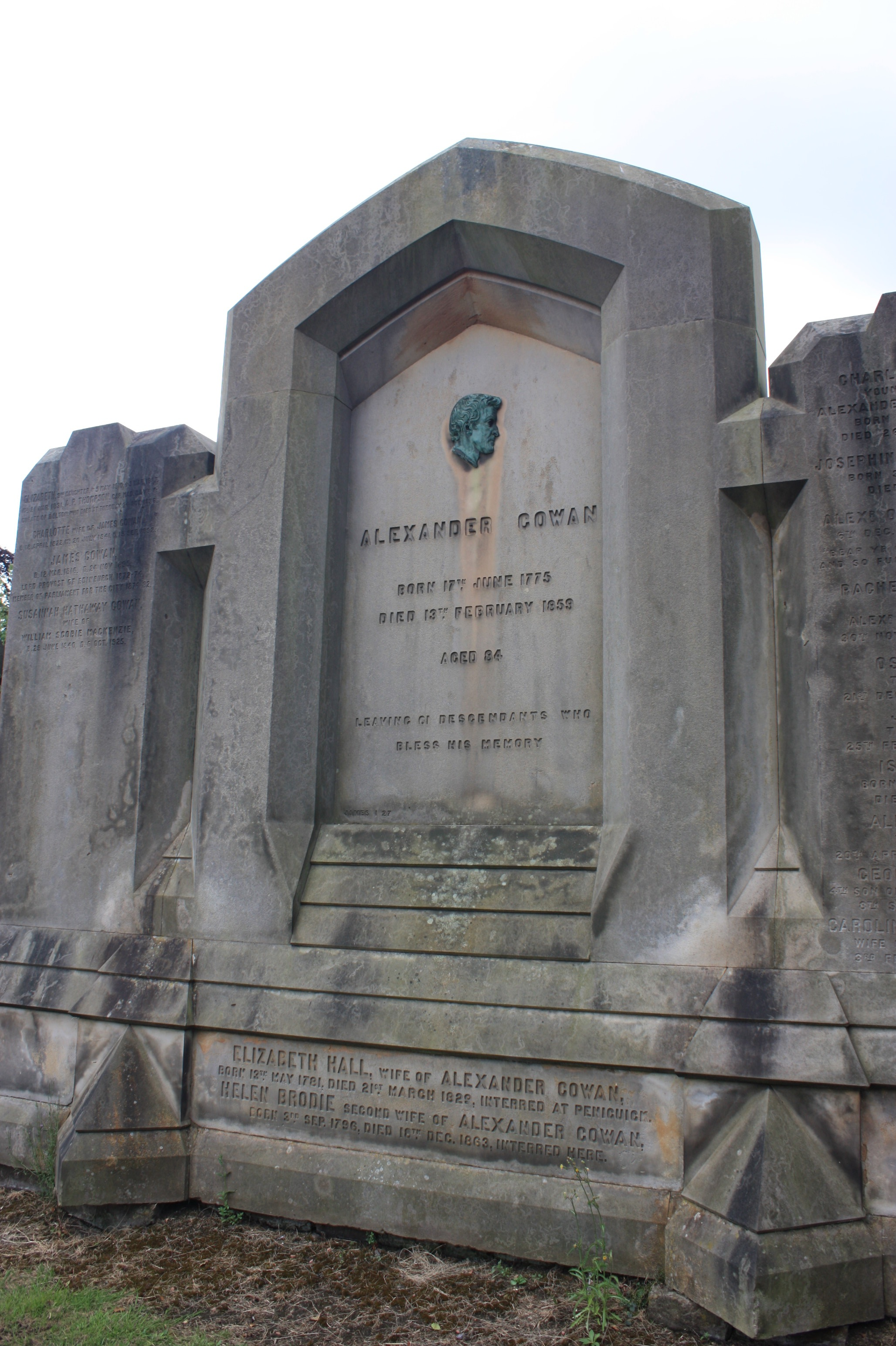
The grave of Alexander Cowan, Grange Cemetery

Cowan was born at Valleyfield on the edge of Penicuik on the banks of the North Esk. He studied physics and chemistry in Edinburgh, and decided to improve the process of paper-making, setting up what was then one of the world's largest mills, which operated for 150 years.

He married Elizabeth Hall, daughter of George Hall, a merchant in Crail, in Fife, in 1800. The couple had several sons, all involved in the family business. Their first child, Charles, was born in 1801 at their house at 12 Charlotte Street, the first of Cowan's eleven children, eight of whom survived to adulthood.

Cowan moved his family to Edinburgh in 1811, which some accounts connect to the illness of his wife Elizabeth. By 1814, when their son John was born, they were living at 5 John Street, a house just off the Canongate, but not part of the Old Moray House as recorded in some records. Elizabeth died on 21 March 1829. In 1830 he married Helen Brodie. Soon after he opened a paper shop at 17 Princes Street in Edinburgh city centre. At the same time he moved a short distance, but to a far grander house, Moray House on the Canongate.

He is known to have been a friend of the botanist Daniel Ellis during this period.

His sons also rose to prominence. Charles Cowan and James Cowan became MPs representing Edinburgh, and Sir John Cowan was created a baronet in 1894.

Cowan is buried in the Grange Cemetery in Edinburgh against the original west wall close to the monument to Andrew Usher. His grave is marked by a large monument, dwarfing even that of Usher. He is buried with his second wife. His first wife is buried in Penicuik.

His family continued in the paper industry, but his main company of Cowan & Co. was taken over by David Chalmers in the late 19th century.

== Philanthropic works ==
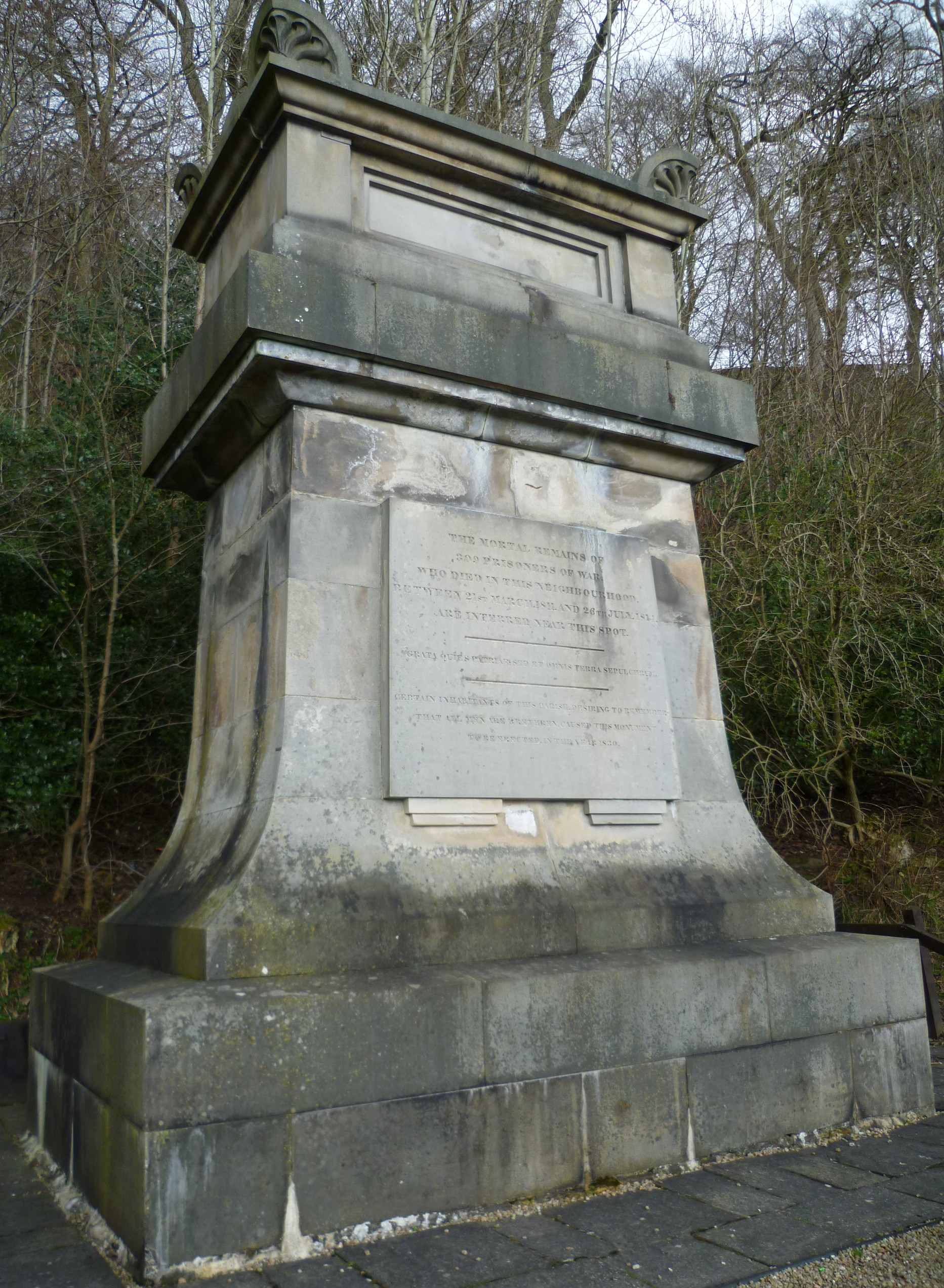
The Valleyfield Monument erected by Alexander Cowan

Among Cowan's philanthropic acts was funding the reglazing of every window on the Royal Mile in Edinburgh, having been disturbed by the poverty he saw there.

In 1797 he set up a public library in Penicuik, one of the first free libraries in Britain.

During the Napoleonic Wars, Penicuik had three separate camps for French prisoners of war between 1803 and 1814. As a result, in 1810 the government commandeered Cowan's mills at Valleyfield for use as a prison for captured sailors and "kidnapped foreign civilians". The Cowan house was used as a prison hospital. During this time the buildings were expanded by the architect Robert Reid. Meanwhile Cowan continued paper-making on the River Esk at Melville Mill. Although the government had comandeered his Valleyfeild Mills, he was able to negotiate their return after the war, having retained the water supply rights which were critical to their operation as mills. Paper manufacture resumed in 1820. The two Robert Reid buildings were expanded and converted to residential use for the large Cowan family. It was named Valleyfield House. Afterwards, around 1830, Cowan commissioned Thomas Hamilton to design a memorial to the memory of the 309 prisoners who died there, erected on a mound near Valleyfield. The monument bears the inscription "All Men Are Brethren". (Note: The full inscription read, "The mortal remains of 309 prisoners of war, who died in this neighbourhood between 21 March 1811, and 26 July 1814, are interred near this spot. Latin: Grata quies patriae, sed et omnis terra sepulchrum, lit. 'Sweet sleep of the country, and all the land of the grave,'. Certain inhabitants of this Parish, desiring to remember that all Men are Brethren, caused this Monument to be erected in the Year 1830." The Latin inscription was suggested by Sir Walter Scott, possibly from Sannazaro. There was also a French inscription, composed by Cowan's son, Alexander.)

In 1832 during the cholera epidemic in Edinburgh, Cowan is said to have sat with victims on the Canongate to comfort them.

Through his agency the village was supplied with gas lighting from 1845 to 1877, Valleyfield Mills being one of the first large factories to have a gas supply (from 1830). In 1809, Cowan improved the existing water supply of Penicuik; afterward, by legacy, he further provided for the establishment of a new water supply which was effected in 1864 with water from the Sillerburn.

In 1851 he set up a village museum in Penicuik within the mill complex. The contents were removed when the mill was taken over by the Reed Paper Group in 1976.

== Family ==
Of Cowan's sons, Charles Cowan (1801–1889) was Member of Parliament for the city from 1847 to 1852, Alexander Cowan (1804–1831), died young leaving a volume of poetry entitled the Remains of Alexander Cowan, and James Cowan (1816–1896) served as Lord Provost of Edinburgh from 1872 to 1874, and as Member of Parliament for the city from 1874 to 1882; and his daughter Lucia Anne married the publisher Thomas Constable, son of Archibald Constable.

Cowan's great-grandson Alexander Cowan FRSE (1863–1943) was a papermaker, as were most descendants, but also a noted amateur botanist, specialising in alpine plants. Another great-grandson, Robert Craig Cowan (1865–1937) was also a Fellow of the Royal Society of Edinburgh.

== The Cowan Institute ==
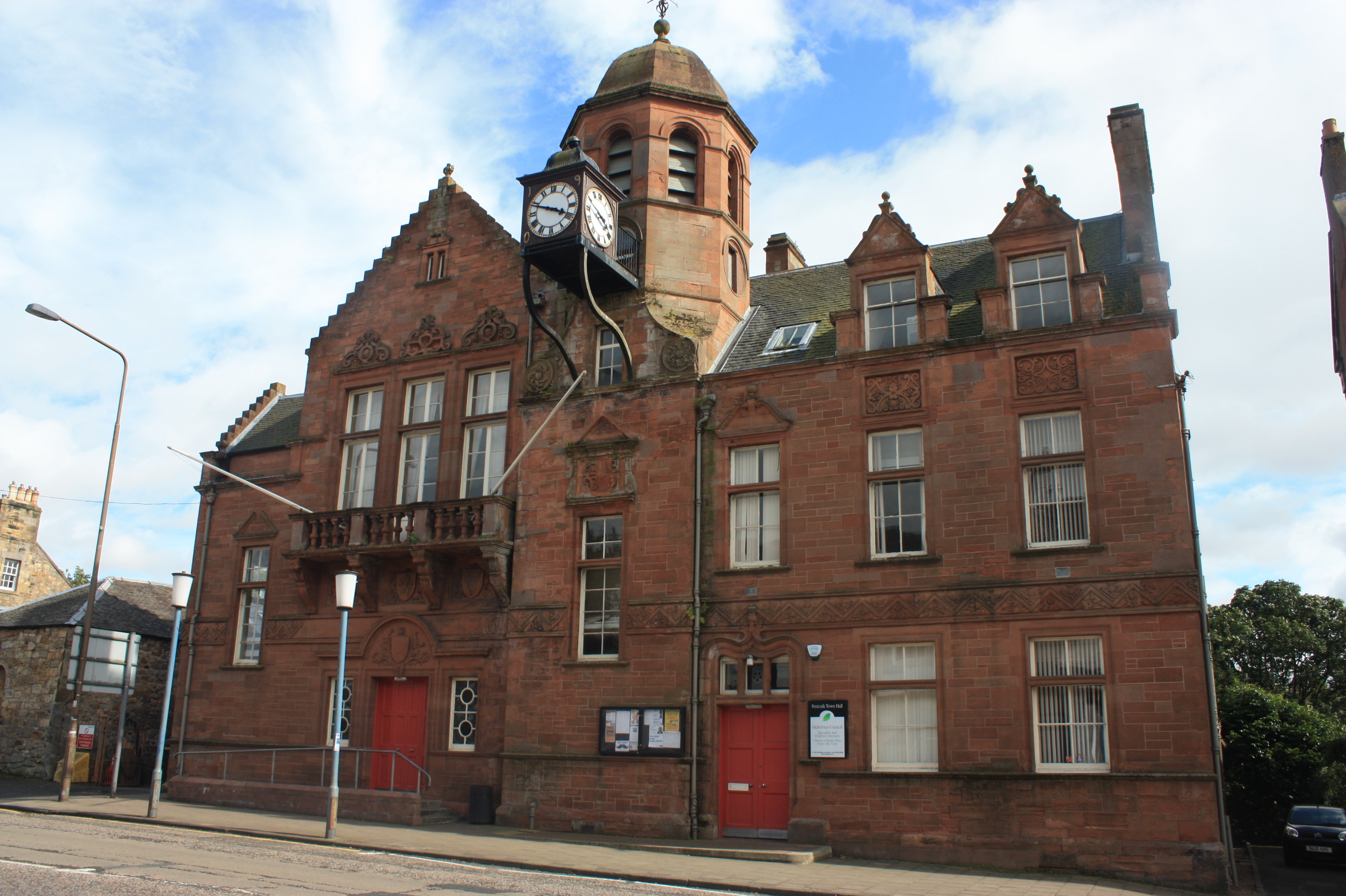
The Cowan Institute, Penicuik

His will left monies to Penicuik sufficient to build the Cowan Institute (later Penicuik Town Hall) in his memory. This was not organised until 1893 to a design by Campbell Douglas, the husband of Cowan's great grand-daughter. The projecting clock was made in the style of the clock at the Canongate Tolbooth.

== Public recognition ==
His portrait by Colvin Smith is in the collection of the Scottish National Portrait Gallery.
