= Mauricewood Colliery disaster =

Mining accident in Scotland

Coordinates: 55°50′30″N 3°13′30″W

The Mauricewood Colliery Disaster, occurred at the Mauricewood pit, near Penicuik, Midlothian, Scotland on 5 September 1889. A total of 63 miners were killed. At the time the mine was owned by the Shotts Iron Company Ltd.

== Fire and rescue operation ==
On 5 September 1889 at around noon sections of the wood lining of a ventilation shaft ignited and the ensuing fire spread to a nearby coal seam, making an escape on the 239m deep main shaft impossible. At that time 70 men and boys were working underground, of which 63 died and 7 survived. The underground fire took four days to extinguish. It was not until 16 March 1890 that all the bodies of the victims were recovered.

== Aftermath ==
The cause of the fire was never determined although it led to the pit being closed which caused major losses to the two local railway lines, the Penicuik Railway and the Edinburgh, Loanhead and Roslin Railway.

A memorial to those lost their lives was erected on the centenary of the disaster in 1989 and stands just off Mauricewood Road.

== In literature ==
Dorothy Alexander's novel The Mauricewood Devils (2016) deals with the responses of the women left behind by the men who died in the Mauricewood Pit.
