= David Chalmers (Scottish industrialist) =

Scottish industrialist (1820 – 1899)

- Born: 1820; Glasgow, Scotland
- Died: 2 May 1899 (aged 78–79); Edinburgh, Scotland
- Other names: David Chalmers of Redhall
- Occupation: Scottish papermaker

David Chalmers, styled David Chalmers of Redhall, FRSE FSA (1820–2 May 1899) was a Scottish industrialist. He was heavily involved in paper manufacture, founding his own company of David Chalmers & Co, and by the late 19th century was the sole owner of Cowan & Co Paperworks.

== Life ==
He was born in Glasgow in 1820 the son of Charles Chalmers, founder of Merchiston Castle School in south-west Edinburgh. Consequently, he was educated at that school, and then at the University of Edinburgh

In 1860 he is shown as owning the paper-mill of Katesmill in Colinton, Edinburgh. He lived adjacent, in Kate's Mill House.

He was elected a Fellow of the Royal Society of Edinburgh in 1866.

In later life he lived in Redhall House in south-west Edinburgh, where he also ran a papermill.

He died on 2 May 1899.
