= Penicuik =

Town in Midlothian, Scotland

Coordinates: 55.826°N 3.220°W

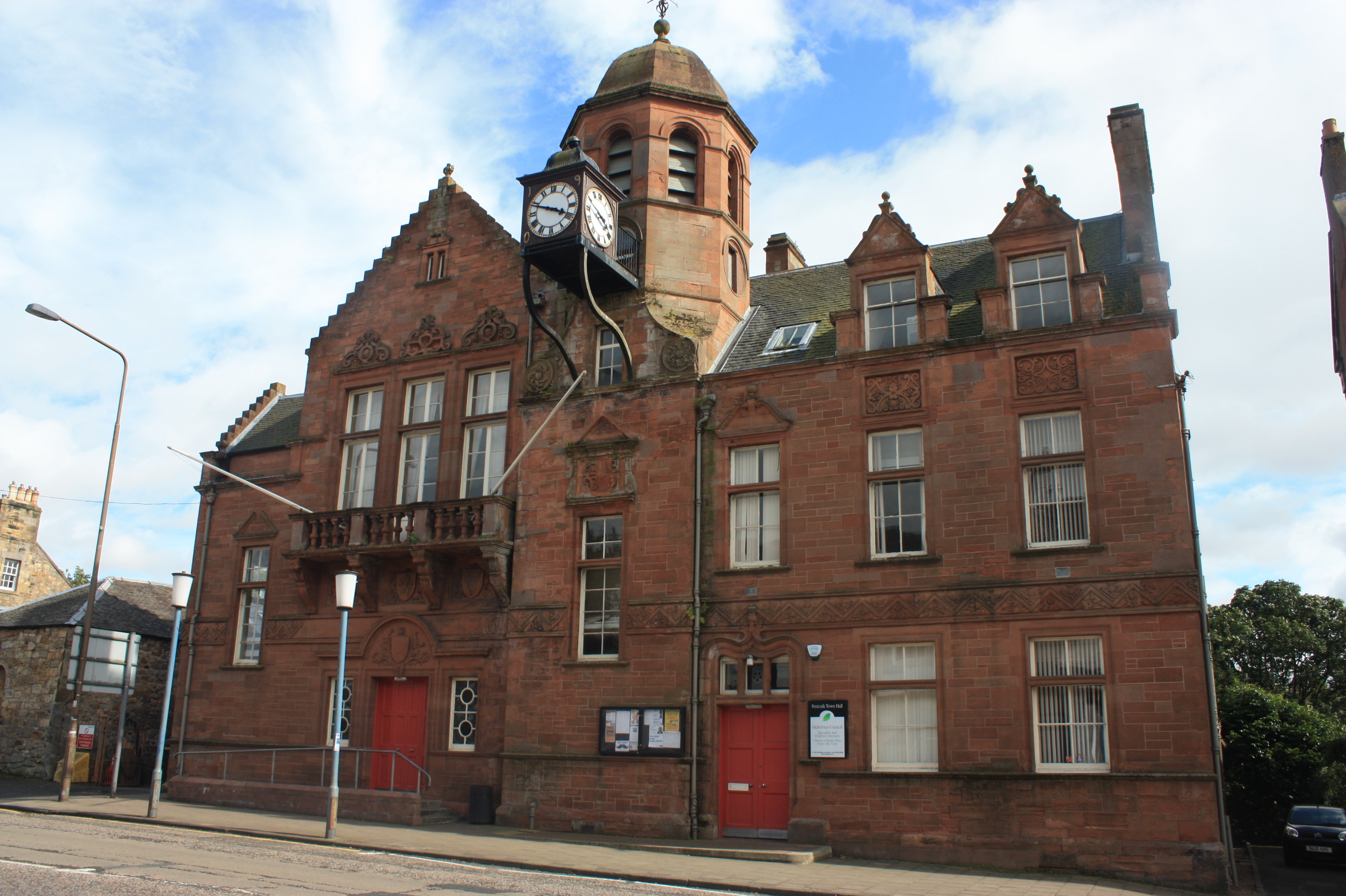
- Penicuik Town Hall

- Location within Midlothian
- Population: 16,150 (2020)
- OS grid reference: NT2359
  - Edinburgh: 8.5 mi (13.7 km)
  - London: 324 mi (521 km)
- Council area: Midlothian
- Lieutenancy area: Midlothian
- Country: Scotland
- Sovereign state: United Kingdom
- Post town: PENICUIK
- Postcode district: EH26
- Dialling code: 01968
- Police: Scotland
- Fire: Scottish
- Ambulance: Scottish
- UK Parliament: Midlothian
- Scottish Parliament: Midlothian South, Tweeddale and Lauderdale

Penicuik (/ˈpɛnɪˌkʊk/ PEN-ee-kuuk; Scottish Gaelic: Ceann na Cuthaige) is a town and former burgh in Midlothian, Scotland, lying on the west bank of the River North Esk. It lies on the A701 midway between Edinburgh and Peebles, east of the Pentland Hills.

== Name ==
The town's name is pronounced "Pennycook" and is derived from a compound meaning "hill of the cuckoo" in the Old Brythonic language (also known as Ancient British and the forerunner of modern Welsh). The modern Welsh equivalent would be Pen y Gog and the Gaelic name, Ceann na Cuthaige, is the literal equivalent of the Welsh name.

== History ==
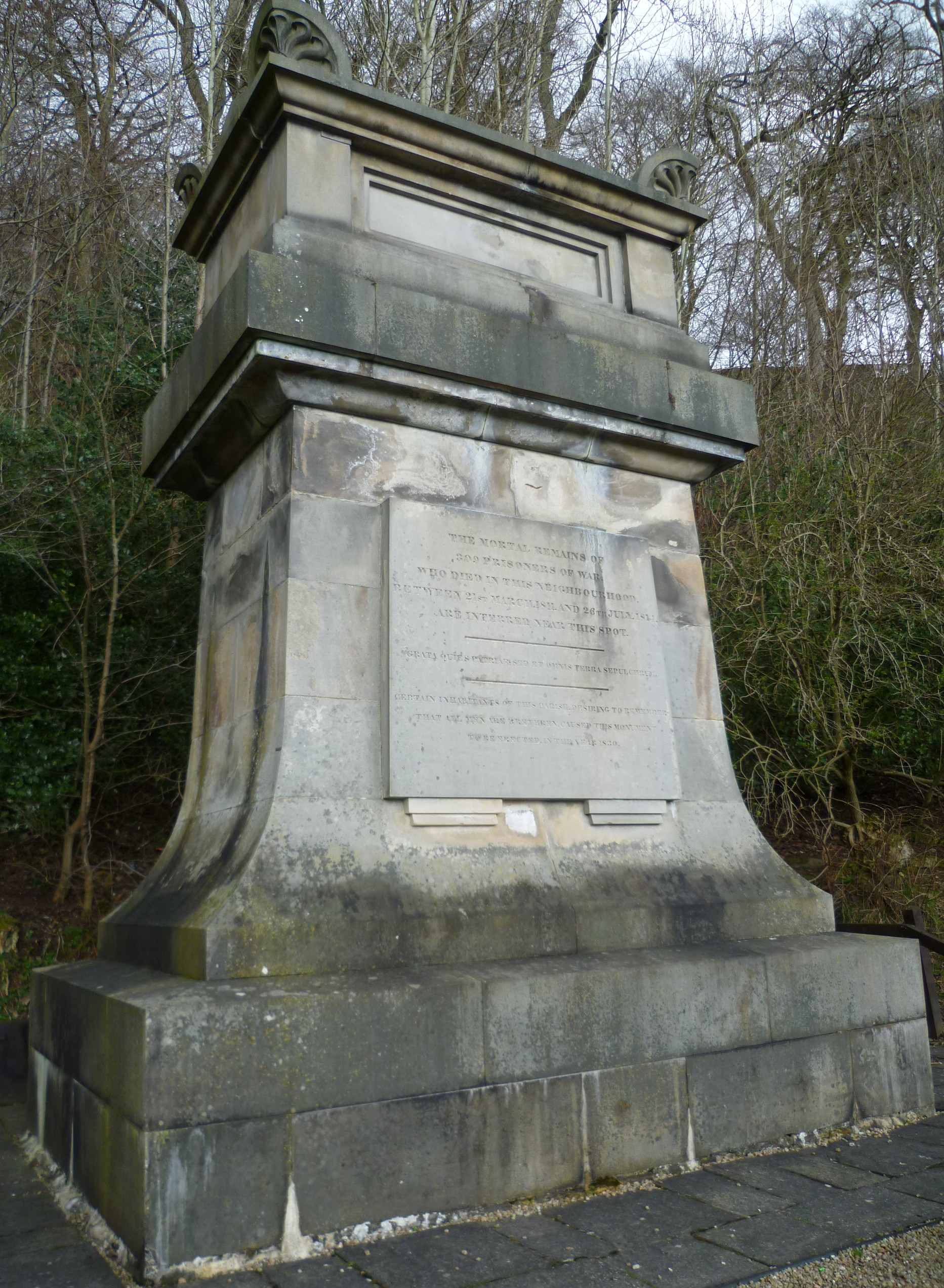
Valleyfield Monument

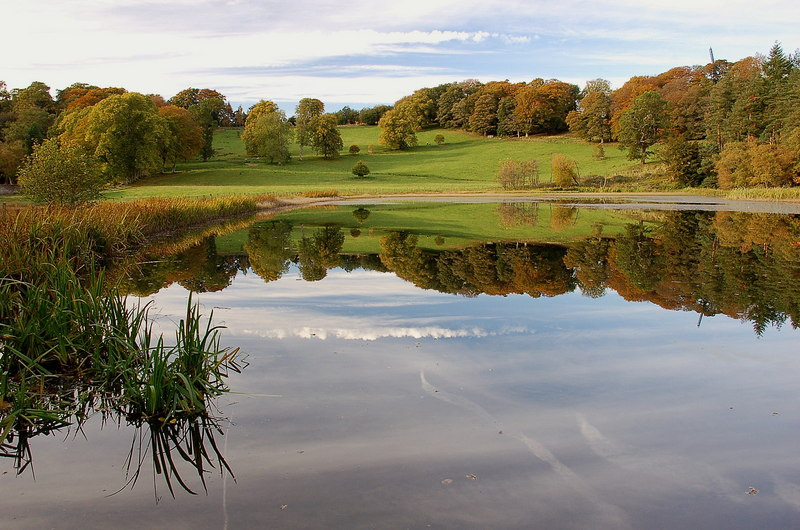
Reflections in Low Pond, Penicuik

In 1296, Thomas Rymer's Foedera mentions a "Walter Edgar a person of Penicok south of Edenburgh", which logically can only be what is now called Penicuik. Penycook appears as the name on John Adair's map of 1682 and the ruined old parish church, in the centre of the graveyard, dates from the late 17th century.

Penicuik became home to an early paper mill, Valleyfield Mill, which was established by Agnes Campbell in 1709.

The Pomathorn Bridge was a toll bridge across the River Esk and the main route between Edinburgh to the north and the Scottish Borders to the south. "The Young Pretender", Charles Edward Stuart, is recorded as having crossed the River Esk on his march south on 8 November 1745.

The town was expanded as a planned village, roughly based on Edinburgh's New Town, by Sir James Clerk, 3rd Baronet of Penicuik in 1770.

Glencorse Barracks, which is home to the Royal Highland Fusiliers, 2nd Battalion The Royal Regiment of Scotland, was established as a facility for incarcerating French prisoners of war during the Napoleonic Wars and was originally known as Greenlaw Military Prison when it was completed in 1803. Charles Cowan, who acquired Valleyfield Mill in 1779, sold it to the War Office in order to create additional prisoner of war facilities in 1811. In 1830, Alexander Cowan erected a monument, designed by Thomas Hamilton, to the memory of 309 prisoners who died in the prisoner of war camps.

Penicuik hosted the inaugural Grand Match in curling, between the north and the south of Scotland, in 1847. This took place on the "high pond" on the estate of Penicuik House, not the "low pond" which is still used for curling on rare occasions.

The town, whilst generally architecturally undistinguished, contains two masterpieces by Frederick Thomas Pilkington: the South Church (originally the United Free Church, of 1862; and the flamboyant "Park End" houses on Bridge Street also of 1862.

Following population growth, largely associated with the paper mills, the town became a burgh in 1866.

In 1889, a fire at the Mauricewood Colliery resulted in the death of 63 men and boys, with only seven survivors. Its owners, The Shotts Iron Company, closed the pit following the disaster.

The Cowan Institute, now known as Penicuik Town Hall, was funded by the Cowan family and designed by Campbell Douglas in 1893.

The Penicuik war memorial was designed by Sir Robert Lorimer and dates from 1920.

The Dalmore paper mill on the North Esk river at Auchendinny closed in 2004.

== Schools ==
There are five primary schools in Penicuik, Cuiken Primary, Cornbank St James Primary, Sacred Heart Primary (Roman Catholic), Strathesk Primary and Mauricewood Primary. There are also two high schools, Penicuik High School and Beeslack High School (which is soon to move out of Penicuik itself).

== Climate ==
Penicuik experiences a maritime climate with cool summers and mild winters. The town's somewhat elevated position (180 m O.S.) means it is more susceptible to snowfall than nearby Edinburgh; over 30 days of the year on average reported lying snow between 1951 and 1980, compared to 14 at Edinburgh. Temperature extremes since 1960 range from 30.2 °C (86.4 °F) during July 1983 to −19.2 °C (−2.6 °F) in January 1982. The coldest temperature in recent years was −12.5 °C (9.5 °F) during January 2010.

Climate data for Penicuik (185 m or 607 ft asl, averages 1991–2020, extremes 1946-2022)
Month	Jan	Feb	Mar	Apr	May	Jun	Jul	Aug	Sep	Oct	Nov	Dec	Year
Record high °C (°F)	12.4 (54.3)	13.3 (55.9)	19.4 (66.9)	25.6 (78.1)	27.2 (81.0)	28.9 (84.0)	30.2 (86.4)	29.4 (84.9)	26.2 (79.2)	20.6 (69.1)	15.6 (60.1)	13.1 (55.6)	30.2 (86.4)
Mean daily maximum °C (°F)	5.9 (42.6)	6.5 (43.7)	8.8 (47.8)	11.7 (53.1)	14.9 (58.8)	17.2 (63.0)	18.9 (66.0)	18.5 (65.3)	15.9 (60.6)	11.9 (53.4)	8.4 (47.1)	6.0 (42.8)	12.1 (53.7)
Daily mean °C (°F)	3.1 (37.6)	3.5 (38.3)	5.1 (41.2)	7.2 (45.0)	10.0 (50.0)	12.6 (54.7)	14.4 (57.9)	14.1 (57.4)	11.8 (53.2)	8.4 (47.1)	5.4 (41.7)	3.1 (37.6)	8.2 (46.8)
Mean daily minimum °C (°F)	0.3 (32.5)	0.4 (32.7)	1.4 (34.5)	2.8 (37.0)	5.1 (41.2)	8.1 (46.6)	9.8 (49.6)	9.7 (49.5)	7.7 (45.9)	4.9 (40.8)	2.3 (36.1)	0.2 (32.4)	4.4 (39.9)
Record low °C (°F)	−19.2 (−2.6)	−13.9 (7.0)	−14.6 (5.7)	−6.9 (19.6)	−4.5 (23.9)	−1.7 (28.9)	1.1 (34.0)	0.4 (32.7)	−2.3 (27.9)	−6.2 (20.8)	−10 (14)	−14.8 (5.4)	−19.2 (−2.6)
Average rainfall mm (inches)	98.1 (3.86)	81.5 (3.21)	68.3 (2.69)	58.0 (2.28)	62.3 (2.45)	81.7 (3.22)	85.9 (3.38)	88.4 (3.48)	74.3 (2.93)	98.8 (3.89)	93.2 (3.67)	103.0 (4.06)	993.5 (39.12)
Average rainy days (≥ 1 mm)	15.5	12.9	12.1	10.7	11.8	12.3	12.9	13.1	12.4	14.5	14.6	15.0	157.8
Mean monthly sunshine hours	34.8	65.5	99.6	129.7	170.9	143.5	146.0	135.3	112.0	80.8	55.2	34.3	1,207.6
Source 1: Met Office
Source 2: Starlings Roost Weather

== Demography ==
Aerial footage of farmland by the Pentland Hills, with views of Penicuik

Its population at the 2020 census was 16,150 computed according to the 2020 definition of the locality.

== Radio ==
Crystal FM is the Community Radio Station serving Penicuik & S W Midlothian on 107.4FM.

== In popular culture ==
Near Penicuik is Glencorse Parish Kirk, which formed part of the inspiration for Robert Louis Stevenson's Weir of Hermiston.

== Notable people ==
Bank House, Penicuik. Home of the Scottish novelist Samuel Rutherford Crockett c. 1886, who often had J. M. Barrie to stay.

Notable people connected with Penicuik include;

- Jim Aitken, Scotland rugby union captain
- Tommy Banner, lead singer from The Wurzels
- Helen Bannerman, writer
- Joseph Bell, surgeon and lecturer at the medical school of the University of Edinburgh
- Agnes Borrowman, first woman to serve on the Pharmaceutical Society's Board of Examiners.
- Sir John Clerk, baronet, composer and leading Scottish politician during the period leading up to the 1707 Act of Union
- Alexander Cowan, papermaker and philanthropist
- Charles Cowan, papermaker and MP for Edinburgh
- James Cowan, Liberal Party politician
- James Cowan, cricketer
- Sir John Cowan, 1st Baronet of Beeslack, papermaker and chairman of the Midlothian Liberal Association
- Samuel Rutherford Crockett, novelist
- Claire Emslie, footballer
- James Cossar Ewart, zoologist
- James Finlayson, industrialist
- Sir James Hamilton, Aircraft designer who led the British Concorde development team
- Jason Kerr, footballer
- Cargill Gilston Knott, mathematician and seismologist
- Sam Nicholson, footballer
- Sir Geoff Palmer, scientist and human rights activist
- Craig Paterson, footballer
- Charles Thomson Rees Wilson, Nobel Prize-winning physicist, was born at a nearby farm

== Twin town ==
Penicuik is twinned with:

- L'Isle-sur-la-Sorgue in the region of Provence.
- Midlothian, Chicago (along with all other towns in Midlothian, Scotland).

== Gallery ==
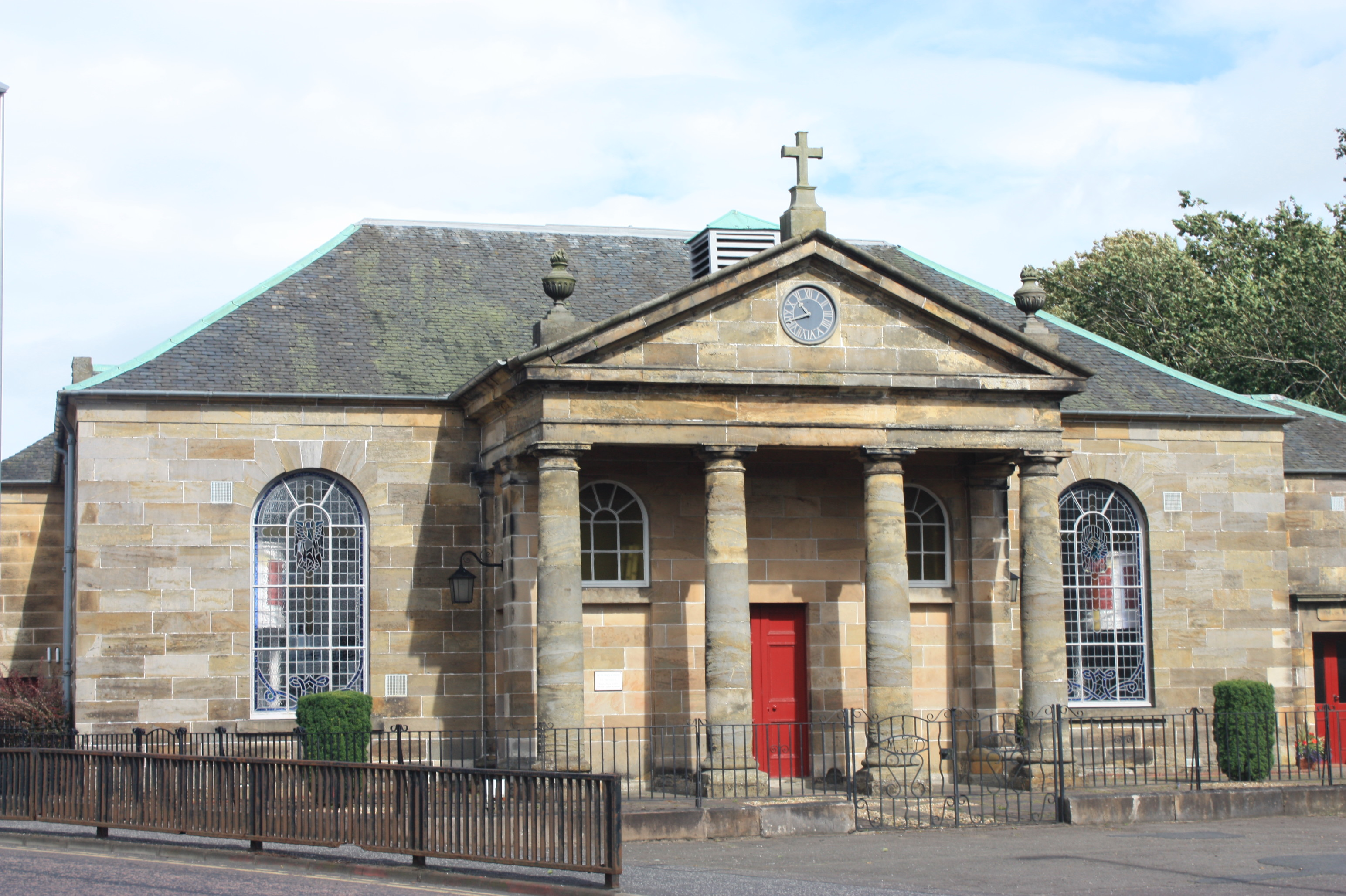
Trinity Community Church, formerly St. Mungo's, Penicuik (1771)

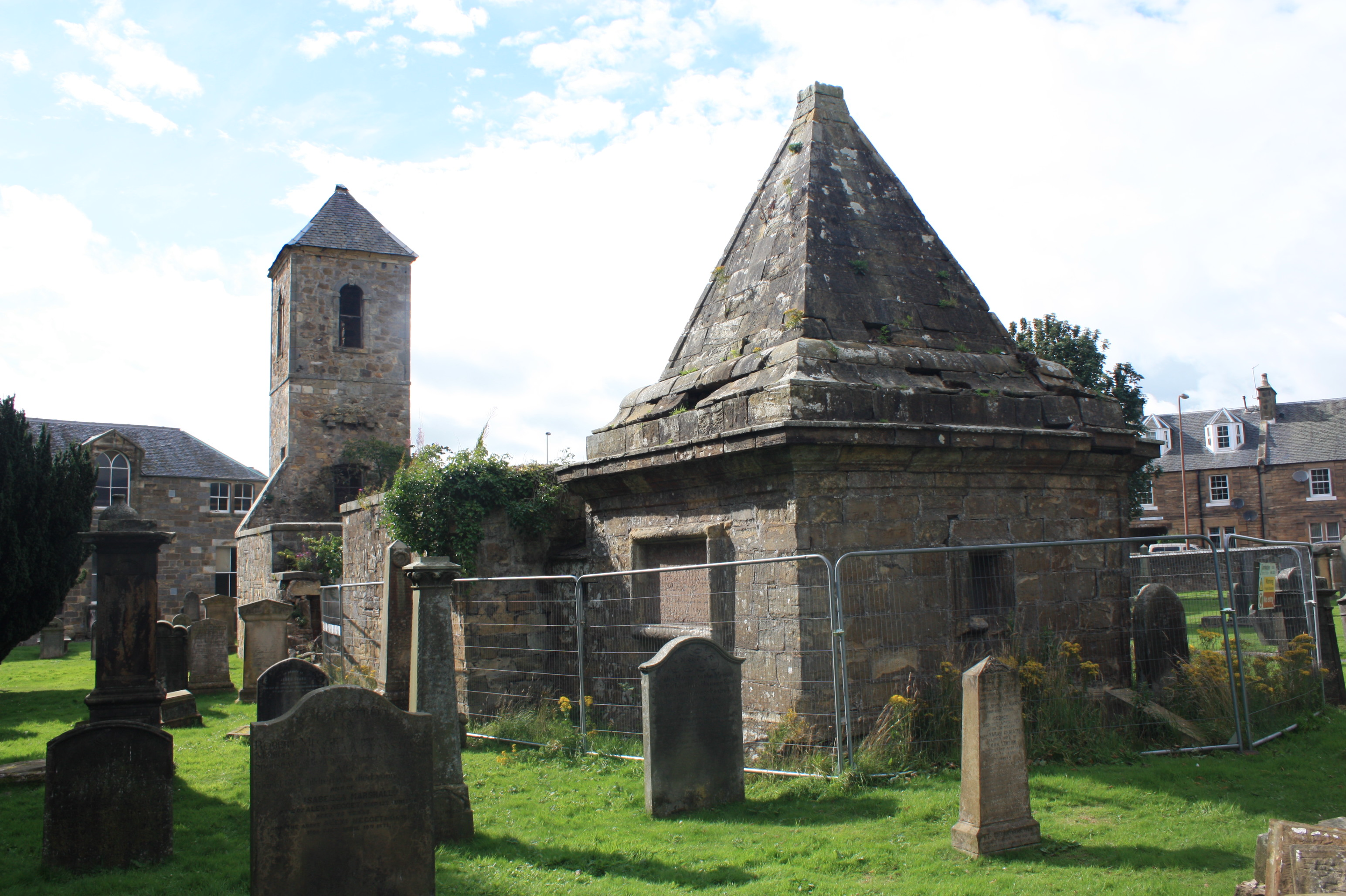
The Clerk mausoleum and old kirk, Penicuik

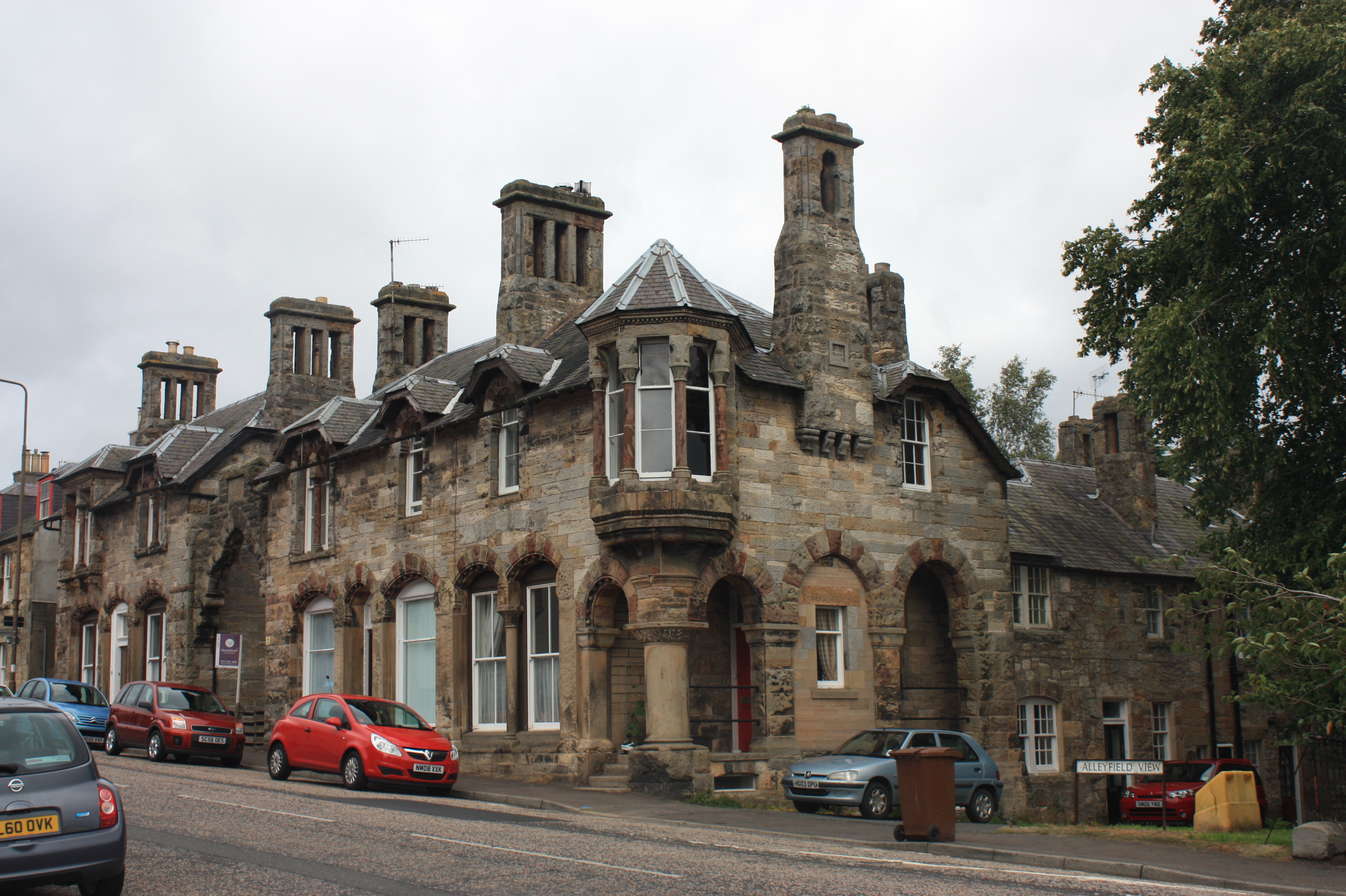
Park End, Penicuik by Frederick Thomas Pilkington

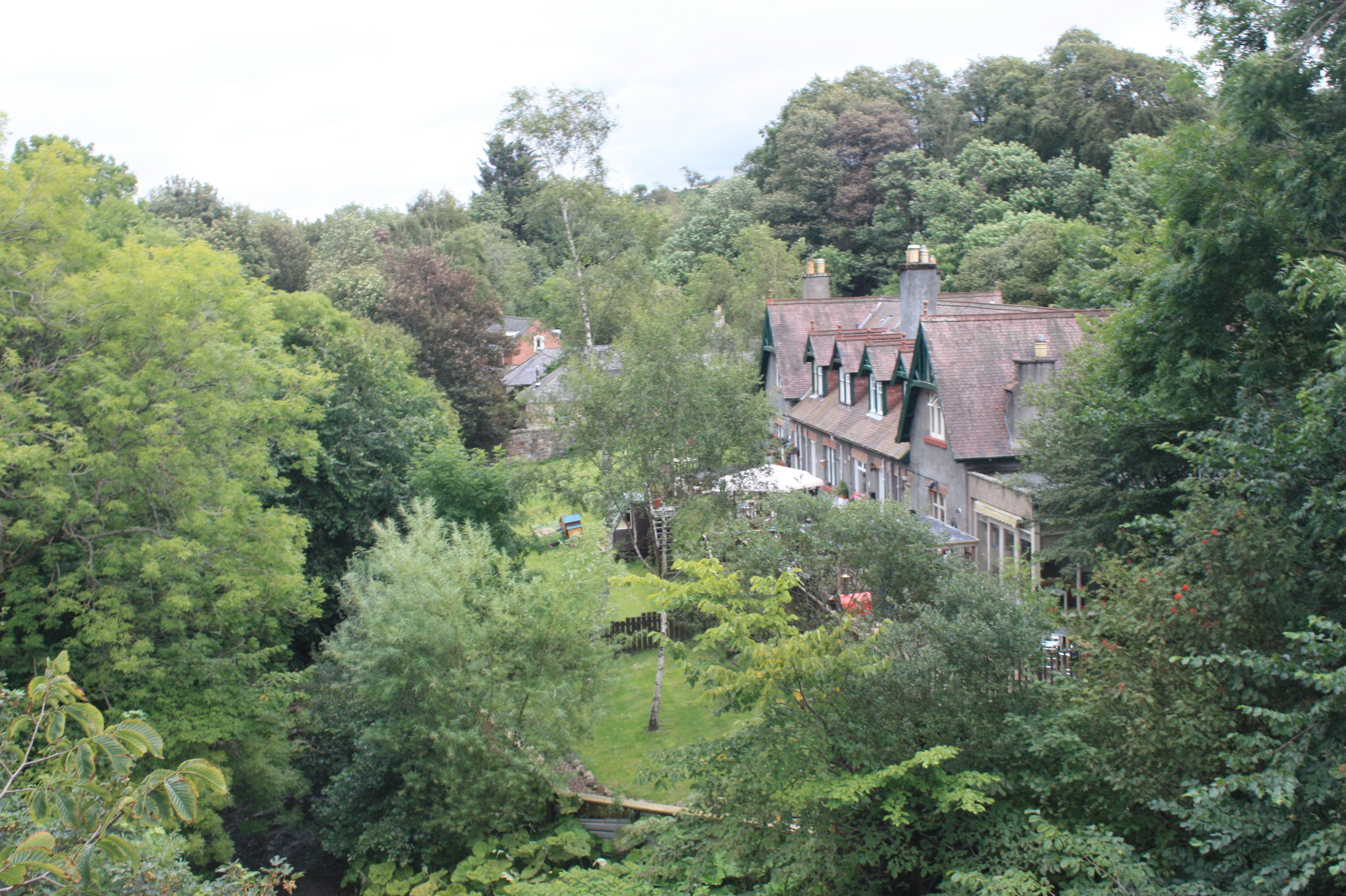
Picturesque housing on the south side of the river at Penicuik

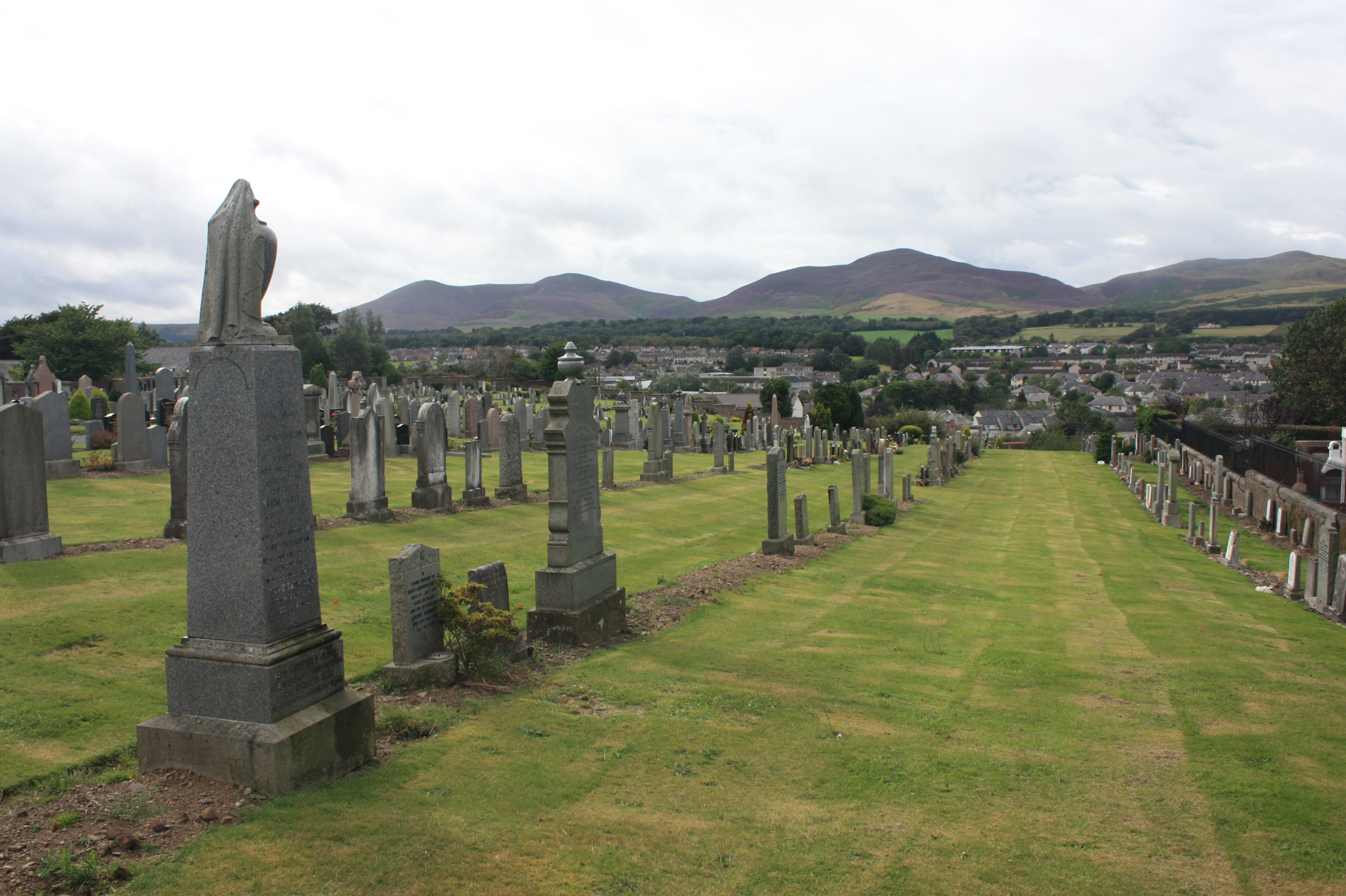
Penicuik Cemetery looking towards the Pentland Hills
