= Penicuik Town Hall =

Municipal building in Penicuik, Scotland

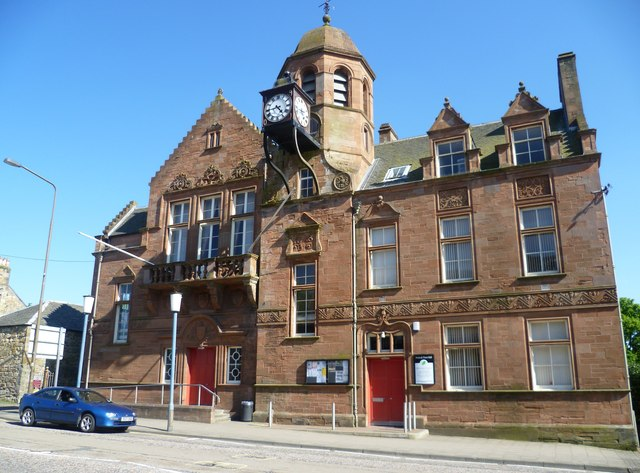
- Penicuik Town Hall

- Shown in Midlothian
- 55.8264°N 3.2206°W
- Location: High Street, Penicuik

History
- Built: 1894

Site notes
- Architect: Campbell Douglas
- Architectural style: Renaissance Revival style

Listed Building – Category C(S)
- Official name: High Street, Council Offices (former Cowan Institute)
- Designated: 9 March 2000
- Reference no.: LB46821

Penicuik Town Hall, formerly the Cowan Institute, is a municipal building in the High Street, Penicuik, Midlothian, Scotland. The structure, which was the meeting place of Penicuik Burgh Council, is a Category C listed building.

== History ==
The building was the initiative of the owner of the local papermaking business at Valleyfield Mills, Alexander Cowan, who left money for the purpose of establishing an institution for the "recreation and instruction" of the local community. Although Cowan had died in 1859, it was not until the early 1890s that his son, Charles Cowan, who was the local Member of Parliament, invited his niece's husband, Campbell Douglas, an established architect, to prepare a plans for the building. The site they chose for the new building was occupied by a row of domestic properties.

The new building was designed in the Renaissance Revival style, built in red sandstone at a cost of £5,000 and was completed in 1894. The design involved an asymmetrical main frontage with six bays facing onto the High Street; the second bay from the left featured a doorway surmounted by a heraldic panel and flanked by two small stained glass windows; above the doorway were the crests of Scotland, England and Ireland, separated by brackets which supporting a balcony; there was a three-light window on the first floor and a gable containing a small window above. The third bay from the left, which slightly projected forward, contained a panel, which inscribed with the year 1893, and was surmounted by an octagonal tower with a dome. The right hand section, which incorporated more regular fenestration, included an ogee-shaped doorway in the third bay from the right. Internally, the principal rooms were an assembly hall, a library, a gymnasium and a museum.

Three baths were added in 1900 and a projecting clock, similar in style to that on the Canongate Tolbooth, was added in 1901. The building was used as accommodation for young soldiers serving at Glencorse Barracks during both the First World War and the Second World War. In July 1936 a tradition was established whereby, in the last week of May each year, a local couple would be selected in the building to be the local hunter and hunter's lass: apparently when Robert the Bruce granted land in the local area to the Clerk family, he insisted that, whenever Kings or Queens of Scotland hunt in the local area, the appointed hunter must attend the gathering and give three blasts on a bugle.

The trustees of the institute sold the building to Penicuik Burgh Council in 1959 (Note: The Burgh Council had previously been based in the Municipal Buildings in Bog Road, Penicuik.) and, after it had been treated for dry rot, it re-opened as the local town hall in 1963. However, it ceased to be the local seat of government when the enlarged Midlothian District Council was formed in 1975. The building was subsequently used as the registrar's office and also as a venue for district court hearings. After the council indicated that the building might be surplus to its requirements, the Penicuik Community Development Trust was formed in March 2005 to ensure the building remained open and fully utilised. In late 2020 a programme of works was initiated to restore the outside of the building, to modernise the heating system and to install Wi-Fi equipment.

== See also ==
- List of listed buildings in Penicuik, Midlothian
