= Richard Paul Blakeney =

Irish-born religious writer 1820–1884

Richard Paul Blakeney (1820–1884) was an Irish-born religious writer and cleric. He was well known as a vigorous champion of evangelical doctrines in the Church of England and was the author of a large number of controversial books and tracts, which attained a wide circulation.

== Life ==
Blakeney was descended from an old Norfolk family, which had moved to Ireland before his birth. He was educated at Trinity College, Dublin, where he graduated B.A. in 1842, taking high honours in theology. In 1852 he proceeded LL.B. and LL.D. Meanwhile, he became curate of St Paul's Church, George Street, Nottingham in 1843, vicar of Hyson Green, Nottinghamshire, in 1844, vicar of Christ Church, Claughton, Birkenhead, in January 1852, vicar of Bridlington in 1874, rural dean of Bridlington in 1876, and a canon of York in 1882.

The University of Edinburgh conferred on him the degree of D.D. in 1868. Blakeney died at Bridlington on 31 December 1884.

== Works ==
- Translation of the Moral Theology of Alphonsus Liguori, 1845, 2nd ed. 1852
- A Manual of Romish Controversy, being a complete Refutation of the Creed of Pope Pius IV, 1851 (this work is stated to have passed through ten editions).
- Protestant Catechism, or Popery refuted and Protestantism established by the Word of God, 1854.
- History and Interpretation of the Book of Common Prayer, 1865, 3rd ed. 1878.
