= National Institute of Medical Herbalists =

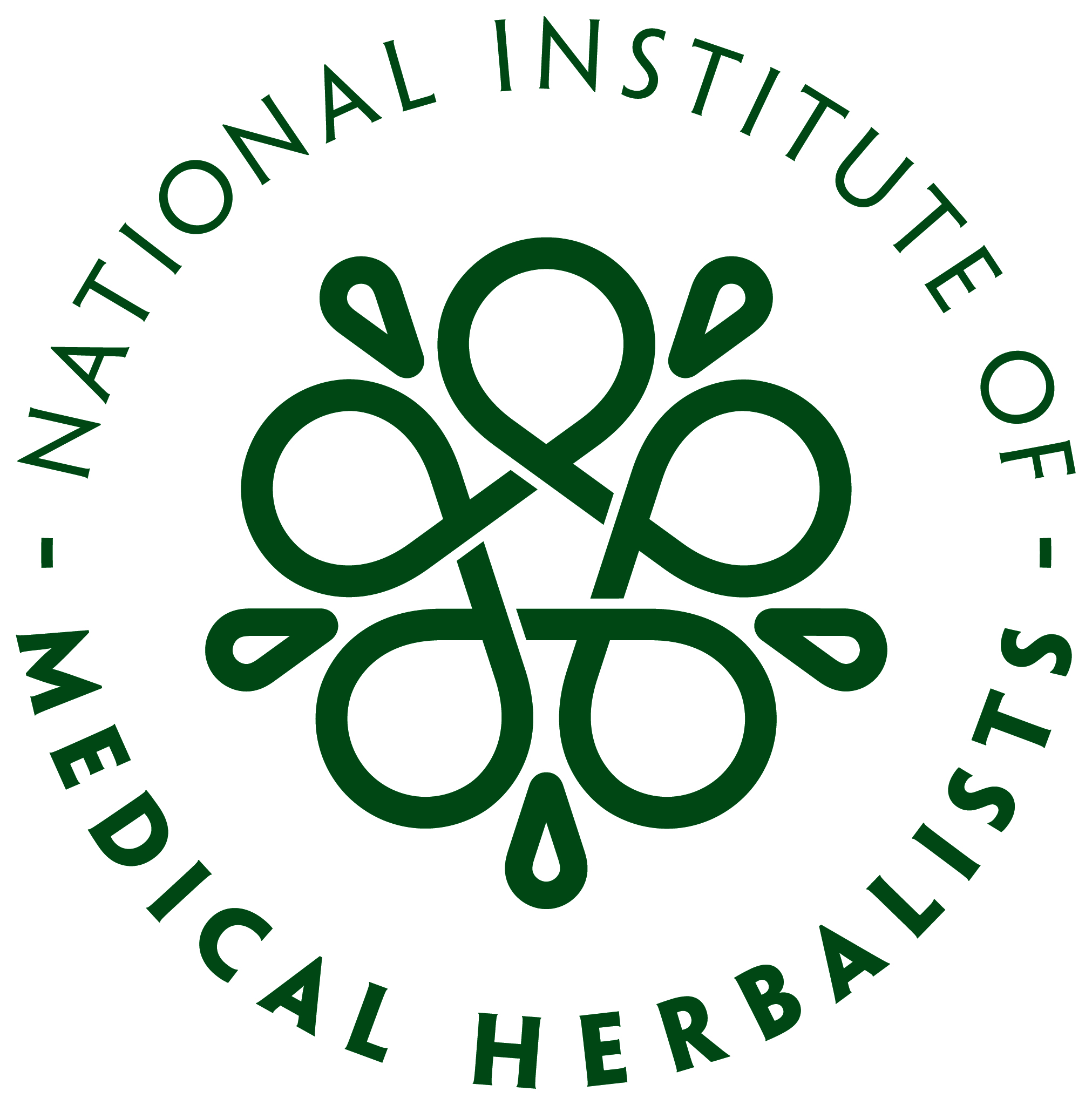

The National Institute of Medical Herbalists (NIMH) is a professional body representing medical herbalists in the United Kingdom. It was first established as the National Association of Medical Herbalists in 1864, and now has members worldwide. As of 2020 it is the UK's largest and oldest regulator of herbal practitioners.

The institute has over 600 practising and 500 non-practising and student members and is the organiser of the annual Herbal Medicine Conference.
