= Moncrieff =

Moncrieff may refer to:

== Family name Moncreiff ==
- Baron Moncreiff, title in the peerage of the U.K.
- James Moncreiff, 1st Baron Moncreiff
- Henry Moncreiff, 2nd Baron Moncreiff
- Francis Moncreiff (bishop) (1906-1984) Anglican bishop
- Moncreiffe baronets, three baronetcies

== Family name Moncrieff ==
- Moncrieff (singer), Irish singer
- Alexander Bain Moncrieff, Irish-Australian engineer
- Alexander Moncrieff, Lord Moncrieff, Scottish judge
- Colonel Sir Alexander Moncrieff, Victorian military engineer responsible for the concept of the disappearing gun
- Alice Moncrieff (born 1881), American contralto and voice teacher
- Chris Moncrieff (1931–2019), British journalist
- Gladys Moncrieff (1892–1976), Australian singer
- Joanna Moncrieff (1966–), British psychiatrist and academic
- John J. Moncrieff (1866–1939), Canadian newspaper editor and conductor
- John Robert Moncrieff (1899–1928), New Zealand aviator
- Karen Moncrieff, American film director
- Michael Moncrieff, Australian rules footballer
- Perrine Millais Moncrieff (1893–1979), New Zealand author, ornithologist and conservationist
- Robert Hope Moncrieff, author
- Seán Moncrieff, Irish writer, journalist and television presenter
  - Moncrieff, his radio show on Newstalk
  - Good Grief Moncrieff!, his chat show on RTÉ
- William Thomas Moncrieff (1794–1857), English dramatist

== Family name Scott Moncrieff ==
- Charles Kenneth Scott Moncrieff (1889–1930), Scottish writer and translator, famous for Remembrance of Things Past
- Colonel Sir Colin Scott-Moncrieff (1836–1918), British engineer who reorganised the irrigation system of Egypt
- Major General Sir George Kenneth Scott-Moncrieff (1855–1924), Scottish soldier and engineer
- George Scott-Moncrieff (1910–1974), Scottish author
- Robert Scott Moncrieff (1793–1869), British illustrator

== Family name Wellwood Moncreiff ==
- Sir Henry Wellwood-Moncreiff, 10th Baronet (1809-1885), minister of the Free Church of Scotland
- Sir James Wellwood Moncreiff, 9th Baronet (1776-1851), lawyer and judge

== Fictional character ==
- Algernon Moncrieff, one of the main characters in Oscar Wilde's play, The Importance of Being Earnest.

== Other uses ==
- Division of Moncrieff, electoral division in Queensland, Australia
- Moncrieff, Australian Capital Territory, planned suburb of Canberra, Australia
- Moncrieff Bay, a bay in South Australia
- Moncrieff v Jamieson [2007] Scottish property law case

== See also ==
- Moncreiffe (disambiguation)
- Moncrief (surname)
