= James Moncreiff =

James Moncreiff may refer to:

- James Moncreiff, 1st Baron Moncreiff, Scottish lawyer and politician
- Sir James Wellwood Moncreiff, 9th Baronet, Scottish lawyer and judge
