= List of listed buildings in Fossoway, Perth and Kinross =

This is a list of listed buildings in the parish of Fossoway in Perth and Kinross, Scotland.

== List ==
Name	Location	Date Listed	Grid Ref. (Note: Sometimes known as OSGB36, the grid reference (where provided) is based on the British national grid reference system used by the Ordnance Survey. • "Guide to National Grid". Ordnance Survey. • "Get-a-map". Ordnance Survey.)	Geo-coordinates	Notes	LB Number (Note: Historic Environment Scotland assign a unique alphanumeric identifier to each designated site in Scotland, for listed buildings this always begins with "LB", for example "LB12345".)	Image
Fossoway And Tulliebole Kirk Crook Of Devon				56°11′01″N 3°33′33″W	Category C(S)	13760	Upload Photo
Tulliebole Doocot				56°11′20″N 3°31′39″W	Category C(S)	11460	Upload Photo
Briglands				56°10′44″N 3°34′16″W	Category B	11463	Upload Photo
Gate-Lodge Briglands				56°10′48″N 3°34′11″W	Category B	11464	Upload Photo
Aldie Castle				56°09′48″N 3°31′52″W	Category A	11469	Upload Photo
The Inn Crook Of Devon				56°11′05″N 3°33′22″W	Category B	11462	Upload Photo
Rumbling Bridge River Devon				56°10′40″N 3°35′09″W	Category B	13762	Upload Photo
Wellwood - Moncreiff Monument Tulliebole Kirkyard				56°11′26″N 3°31′30″W	Category C(S)	11458	Upload Photo
Gairney House				56°10′21″N 3°28′40″W	Category B	11466	Upload Photo
Blairingone Church Of Scotland				56°09′17″N 3°37′38″W	Category C(S)	11467	Upload Photo
Solsgirth House				56°08′34″N 3°38′15″W	Category B	51652	Upload Photo
North Fossoway Bridge				56°11′57″N 3°35′45″W	Category C(S)	11457	Upload Photo
Mawmill Farmhouse				56°10′25″N 3°28′41″W	Category B	13761	Upload Photo
Tullibole Castle aka Tulliebole Castle				56°11′18″N 3°31′41″W	Category A	11459	Upload Photo
Middle Coldrain Farmhouse				56°11′12″N 3°29′01″W	Category B	11465	Upload Photo
Powmill, Moubray Village Hall Including War Memorial And Boundary Walls				56°09′57″N 3°34′48″W	Category C(S)	49505	Upload Photo
Fossoway Bridge River Devon Crook Of Devon				56°11′06″N 3°33′33″W	Category B	11461	Upload Photo
Solsgirth Home Farm				56°08′27″N 3°38′15″W	Category B	11468	Upload Photo

== Key ==
The scheme for classifying buildings in Scotland is:

- Category A: "buildings of national or international importance, either architectural or historic; or fine, little-altered examples of some particular period, style or building type."
- Category B: "buildings of regional or more than local importance; or major examples of some particular period, style or building type, which may have been altered."
- Category C: "buildings of local importance; lesser examples of any period, style, or building type, as originally constructed or moderately altered; and simple traditional buildings which group well with other listed buildings."

In March 2016 there were 47,288 listed buildings in Scotland. Of these, 8% were Category A, and 50% were Category B, with the remaining 42% being Category C.
