= Moncrief =

Moncrief is a surname of Scottish origin. Notable people with the surname include:

- Brianne Moncrief (born 1983), American actress
- Donte Moncrief (born 1993), American football player
- James Moncrief (1741–1793), British military engineer
- Keith W. Moncrief, American politician in New Hampshire
- Mike Moncrief, American politician in Texas
- Raleigh Moncrief, American musician
- Sidney Moncrief (born 1957), American basketball player
- Vincent Moncrief, American mathematician and physicist
- William Moncrief (1920–2021), American businessman
- Zac Moncrief (born 1971), American animator

== See also ==
- Moncrieff (disambiguation)
- Moncreiffe (disambiguation)
