= Moncreiffe baronets =

Baronetcy in the Baronetage of the United Kingdom

There have been three baronetcies created for people with the surname Moncreiffe or Moncreiff, two in the Baronetage of Nova Scotia and one in the Baronetage of the United Kingdom. Two of the titles are dormant, as the heir has not proved his descent, and one is extant, though its holder does not bear the surname of Moncreiffe.

== Moncreiff baronets, of Moncreiff (NS, 1626) ==
The first creation was for John Moncreiff, of Moncreiff in Perthshire, with remainder to his heirs male whatsoever. He later represented Perthshire in the Parliament of Scotland. His son, the second baronet, sold the barony of Moncreiffe to his cousin Thomas Moncreiffe in 1663. Following the deaths of his brothers David and James, the issue male of the first baronet became extinct, and the baronetcy passed to John Moncreiff of Tippermalloch, a physician, son of Hugh Moncreiff who was the brother of the first baronet. On the death of his son Hugh in 1744 the baronetcy became dormant.

In about 1750 the title was assumed by the Rev. William Moncreiff (son of the Rev. Archibald Moncreiff, son of the Rev. William Moncreiff, son of the Rev. George Moncreiff, son of the Rev. Archibald Moncreiff, younger brother of William Moncreiff, the father of the first baronet), though he never proved his right as heir-male. His son Henry inherited Tullibole Castle in Kinross-shire from his uncle Henry Wellwood, and adopted the additional surname of Wellwood. He served as Moderator of the General Assembly of the Church of Scotland in 1785. His son James, ninth baronet, was a Lord of Session with the title Lord Moncreiff, and was the father of Henry, tenth baronet, Moderator of the General Assembly of the Free Church of Scotland in 1861, and of James, who succeeded to the title in 1883.

James Moncreiff had been created Baron Moncreiff in 1874, and the baronetcy and the peerage remained united from 1883 until the death of the fifteenth baronet in 2002, when the baronetcy became dormant.

- Sir John Moncreiff, 1st Baronet (died c. 1651)
- Sir John Moncreiff, 2nd Baronet (1635–1674)
- Sir David Moncreiff, 3rd Baronet (died c. 1690)
- Sir James Moncreiff, 4th Baronet (died 1698)
- Sir John Moncreiff, 5th Baronet (c. 1628–1714)
- Sir Hugh Moncreiff, 6th Baronet (died 1744)
- Sir William Moncreiff, 7th Baronet (died 1767)
- Sir Henry Moncreiff Wellwood, 8th Baronet (1750–1827)
- Sir James Wellwood Moncreiff, 9th Baronet (1776–1851)
- Sir Henry Wellwood Moncreiff, 10th Baronet (1809–1883)
- James Moncreiff, 1st Baron Moncreiff (1811–1895)

The heir since 2002 is Rhoderick Harry Wellwood Moncreiff, 6th Baron Moncreiff, who has not proven his succession.

== Moncreiffe baronets, of Moncreiffe (NS, 1685) ==
The second creation was on 30 November 1685 for Thomas Moncreiffe, of Moncreiffe in Perthshire, with remainder to his heirs male whatsoever. He was the son of David Moncreiffe, of Rapness in Orkney, of a younger branch of the family of Moncreiff of Tullibole. He amassed a fortune while serving as Clerk of the Exchequer and Treasury in Scotland, and purchased the estate of Moncreiffe from Sir John Moncreiffe, 2nd Baronet (see above) in 1663. He was succeeded by his nephew Thomas, son of his brother Harry. The baronetcy then passed from father to son until the eighth baronet, Robert Drummond. He was succeeded by his nephew Commander Guy Moncreiffe, son of Thomas George Harry Moncreiffe. His son the tenth baronet was killed in a fire at Moncreiffe House, and was succeeded by his cousin Captain Iain Moncreiffe of Easter Moncreiffe, son of Lieutenant-Commander (Thomas) Gerald Auckland Moncreiffe, brother of the ninth baronet. The eleventh baronet, a herald and genealogist, was succeeded by his elder son, who had previously succeeded his mother as Earl of Erroll and Chief of Clan Hay. The chiefship of Clan Moncreiffe reverted to Miss Elizabeth Moncreiffe of Moncreiffe, sister of the tenth baronet. On her death in 1997 it passed to the younger brother of the twelfth baronet, Peregrine Moncreiffe of that Ilk.

George Moncreiffe of Moredun, younger son of the second baronet, was one of the barons of the Scottish Court of Exchequer. The eight daughters of the seventh baronet were noted beauties of the late Victorian era and included Louisa, who married the Duke of Atholl; Helen, who married Sir Charles John Forbes, 4th Baronet; Georgina Elizabeth, who married the Earl of Dudley; Harriet Sarah, who married Sir Charles Mordaunt, 10th Baronet; and Frances Rose, who married Sir Alexander Muir Mackenzie, 3rd Baronet.

- Sir Thomas Moncreiffe, 1st Baronet (c. 1627–1715)
- Sir Thomas Moncreiffe, 2nd Baronet (died 1738)
- Sir Thomas Moncreiffe, 3rd Baronet (1704–1739)
- Sir Thomas Moncreiffe, 4th Baronet (1732–1784)
- Sir Thomas Moncreiffe, 5th Baronet (1758–1818)
- Sir David Moncreiffe, 6th Baronet (1788–1830)
- Sir Thomas Moncreiffe, 7th Baronet (1822–1879)
- Sir Robert Drummond Moncreiffe, 8th Baronet CB CMG (1856–1931)
- Sir John Robert Guy Moncreiffe, 9th Baronet (1884–1934)
- Sir David Gerald Moncreiffe, 10th Baronet (1922–1957)
- Sir Rupert Iain Kay Moncreiffe, 11th Baronet (1919–1985)
- Merlin Sereld Victor Gilbert Hay, 24th Earl of Erroll (born 1948)

The heir-apparent to the title is Lord Erroll's elder son Harry Thomas William Hay, Lord Hay (born 1984).

== Moncreiff baronets, of Kilduff (UK, 1871) ==
The third creation was on 23 May 1871, for James Moncreiff, of Kilduff in Kinross-shire, second son of the ninth baronet of the first creation. He was a former Solicitor General for Scotland and Lord Advocate, and at the time of his elevation was serving as Lord Justice Clerk, with the title Lord Moncreiff. On 9 January 1874 he was further created Baron Moncreiff, of Tullibole in the county of Kinross, and in 1883 he succeeded his brother as eleventh baronet. Thereafter the baronetcies and the peerage remained united until the death of the fifth and fifteenth baronet in 2002, when the baronetcy became dormant.

- James Moncreiff, 1st Baron Moncreiff (1811–1895)

The heir since 2002 is Rhoderick Harry Wellwood Moncreiff, 6th Baron Moncreiff, who has not proven his succession.
