= Moncreiffe =

Moncreiffe may refer to:

== People ==
- Georgina Ward, Countess of Dudley (née Moncreiffe; 1846–1929), Scottish noblewoman
- Sir Iain Moncreiffe of that Ilk (1919–1985), Baronet, British officer in arms, clan chief
- Sir Thomas Moncreiffe, 7th Baronet (1822–1879), Scottish first-class cricketer and British Army officer

== Places ==
- Moncreiffe Hill, ridge south of Perth, Scotland
- Moncreiffe Island, dividing the River Tay below Perth, Scotland

== Other uses ==
- Clan Moncreiffe, Highland Scottish clan
- Baron Moncreiff, title in the peerage of the United Kingdom

== See also ==
- Moncrieff (disambiguation)
- Moncrief (surname)
