= Henry Moncreiff, 2nd Baron Moncreiff =

Scottish judge

Henry Moncreiff
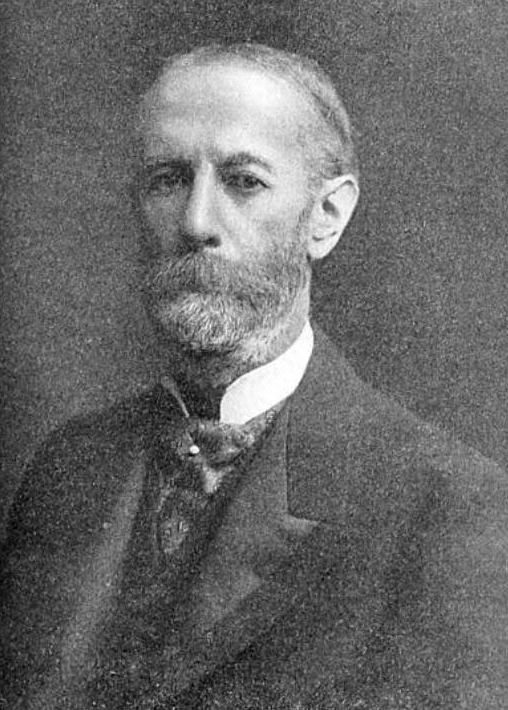
- Born: 24 April 1840; Edinburgh, Scotland
- Died: 3 March 1909 (aged 68); Bournemouth, England
- Burial place: Grange Cemetery
- Education: Harrow School; Trinity College, Cambridge
- Occupation: Judge
- Spouses: Susan Wilhelmine Dick-Cunyngham (m. 1866; died 1869) Millicent Julia Fryer (m. 1873; died 1881)
- Parents: James Moncreiff (father); Isabella Bell (mother)
- Relatives: Robert Moncreiff (brother)

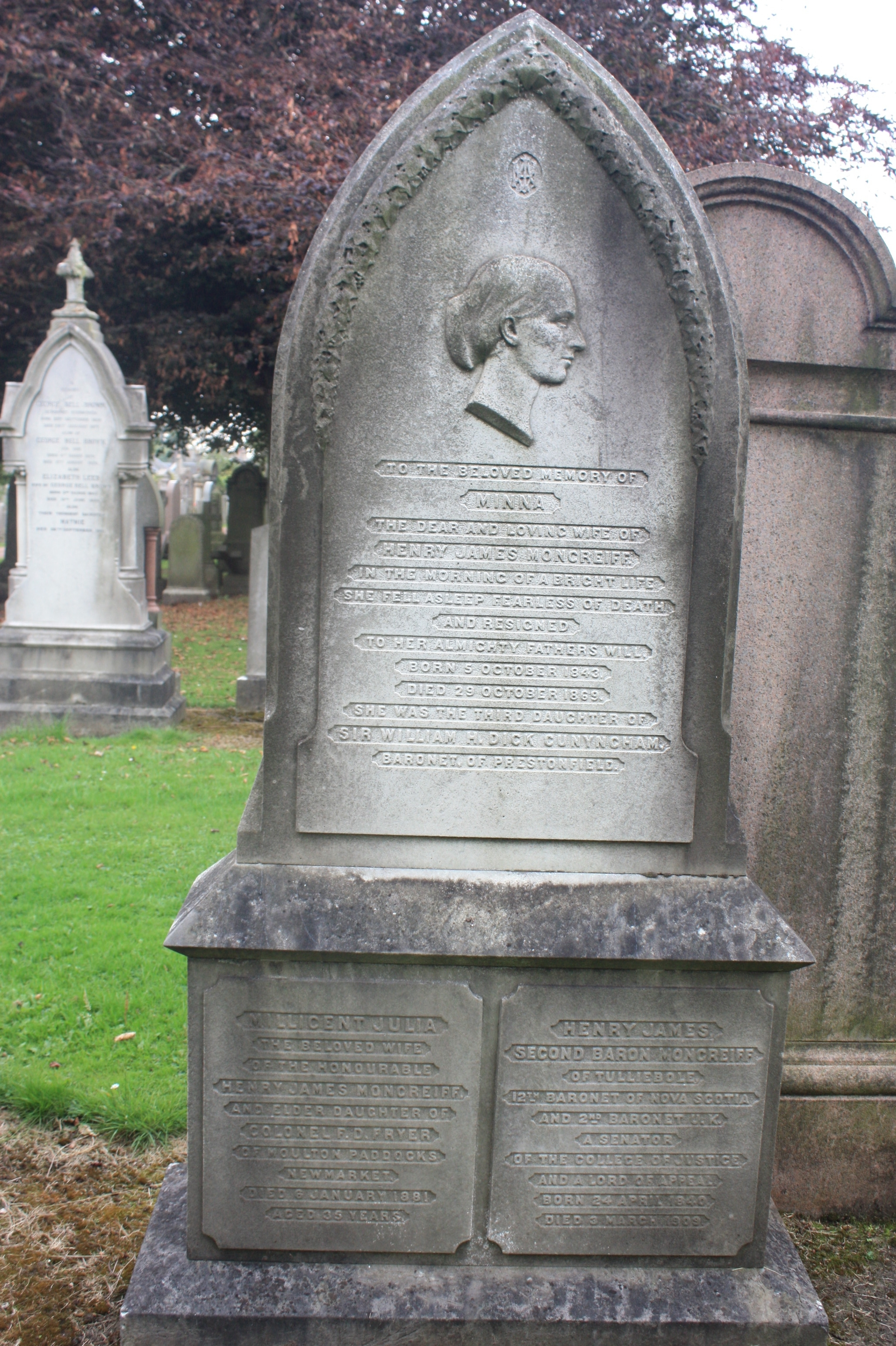
Henry Moncrieff's grave, Grange Cemetery

Henry James Moncreiff, 2nd Baron Moncreiff (24 April 1840 – 3 March 1909) was a Scottish judge who succeeded to the title Baron Moncreiff.

== Life ==
Moncreiff was born in Edinburgh, the elder son of James Moncreiff, 1st Baron Moncreiff and his wife Isabella Bell, daughter of Robert Bell, Procurator of the Church of Scotland. He was educated at Harrow School and was admitted at Trinity College, Cambridge on 22 March 1858. He was awarded BA in 1862 and LL.B. in 1864.

Moncreiff was admitted as an advocate in 1863 and was Advocate-Depute in 1866, from 1868 to 1874 and in 1881. He was Sheriff of Renfrew and Bute from 1881 to 1888. In 1888 he became a Senator of the College of Justice, Scotland, with the judicial title of Lord Wellwood. He succeeded to the title Baron Moncreiff on the death of his father on 27 April 1895. In July 1901 he became Lord Lieutenant of Kinross-shire. He was author of Review in Criminal Cases. He lived at Tullibole Castle, near Crook of Devon in Kinrossshire.

Moncreiff married firstly on 3 April 1866 Susan Wilhelmine Dick-Cunyngham, daughter of Sir William Hanmer Dick-Cunyngham, 8th Baronet. She was affectionately known as Minna. She died aged only 26. He married secondly on 26 March 1873, Millicent Julia Fryer, daughter of Colonel Frederick Daniel Fryer, of Moulton Paddocks, Newmarket. She also died relatively young, in 1881, aged only 35. He had no children and was succeeded by his brother Robert.

Henry Moncreiff died at Bournemouth on 3 March 1909. He is buried with his two wives in the south-east corner of Grange Cemetery in Edinburgh. The stone bears a low-relief portrait of his young wife Minna.

Peerage of the United Kingdom
Preceded by James Moncreiff	Baron Moncreiff; 1895–1909	Succeeded by Robert Moncreiff
