= Robert Moncreiff, 3rd Baron Moncreiff =

English clergyman, cricketer, and Baron

Robert Chichester Moncreiff, 3rd Baron Moncreiff (24 August 1843 – 14 May 1913) was a Scottish clergyman and cricketer who succeeded to the title Baron Moncreiff.

Moncreiff was born at Edinburgh, the younger son of James Moncreiff, 1st Baron Moncreiff and his wife Isabella Bell, daughter of Robert Bell, Procurator of the Church of Scotland. He was educated at Harrow School where he was in the cricket XI in 1852. He was admitted at Trinity College, Cambridge on 5 January 1863. He played cricket for his college and also played for the Quidnuncs.

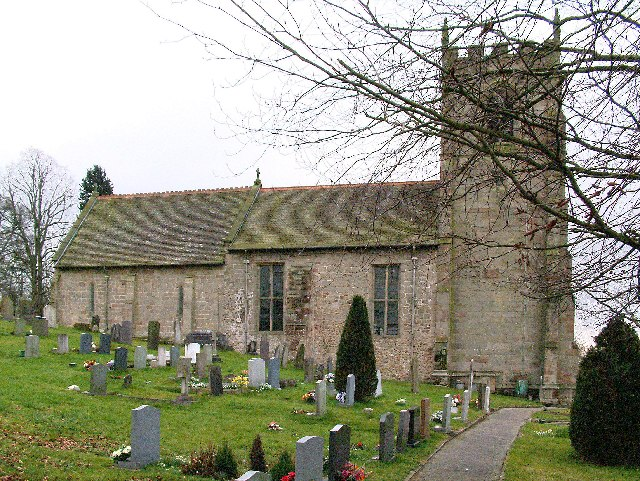
St Andrews Church, Cubley

In 1870, Moncreiff was awarded BA and ordained a deacon at Lichfield when he became curate of Cubley, Derbyshire. He was ordained priest in 1871 at Chichester. He played cricket for various clubs and mainly for Gentlemen of counties including Derbyshire, Cheshire and Staffordshire. In 1873 he played one match for Derbyshire County Cricket Club when they needed 16 players in an extra match against Nottinghamshire. He also played for Staffordshire and the Incogniti. In 1875, he became vicar of Clifton-upon-Teme, Worcestershire and played cricket regularly for Gentlemen of Worcestershire until 1881. He became vicar of Tanworth-in-Arden, Warwickshire in 1885 and remained there until his death aged 69. He was described as an eloquent preacher.

In 1909, Moncreiff succeeded to the title Baron Moncreiff on the death of his elder brother Henry.

Moncreiff married Florence Kate Fitzherbert, daughter of Colonel Richard Henry FitzHerbert, of Somersal Herbert on 4 January 1871. He was succeeded by his son James Arthur Fitzherbert Moncreiff, 4th Baron Moncreiff.

Peerage of the United Kingdom
Preceded by Henry Moncreiff	Baron Moncreiff; 1909–1913	Succeeded by James Moncreiff
