= Thomas Barnes (journalist) =

English journalist, essayist, and editor (1785–1841)

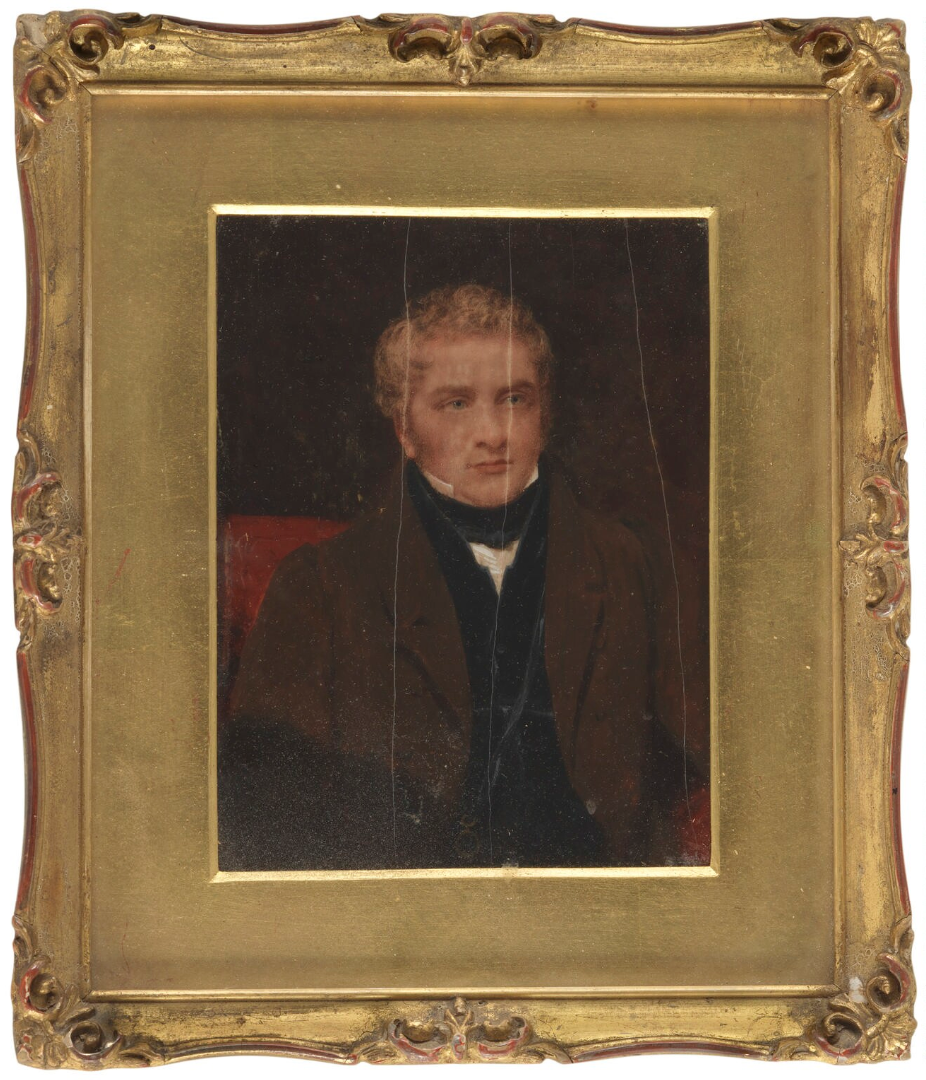
- Born: 11 September 1785; London
- Died: 7 May 1841
- Education: Pembroke College, Christ's Hospital
- Occupation: Journalist

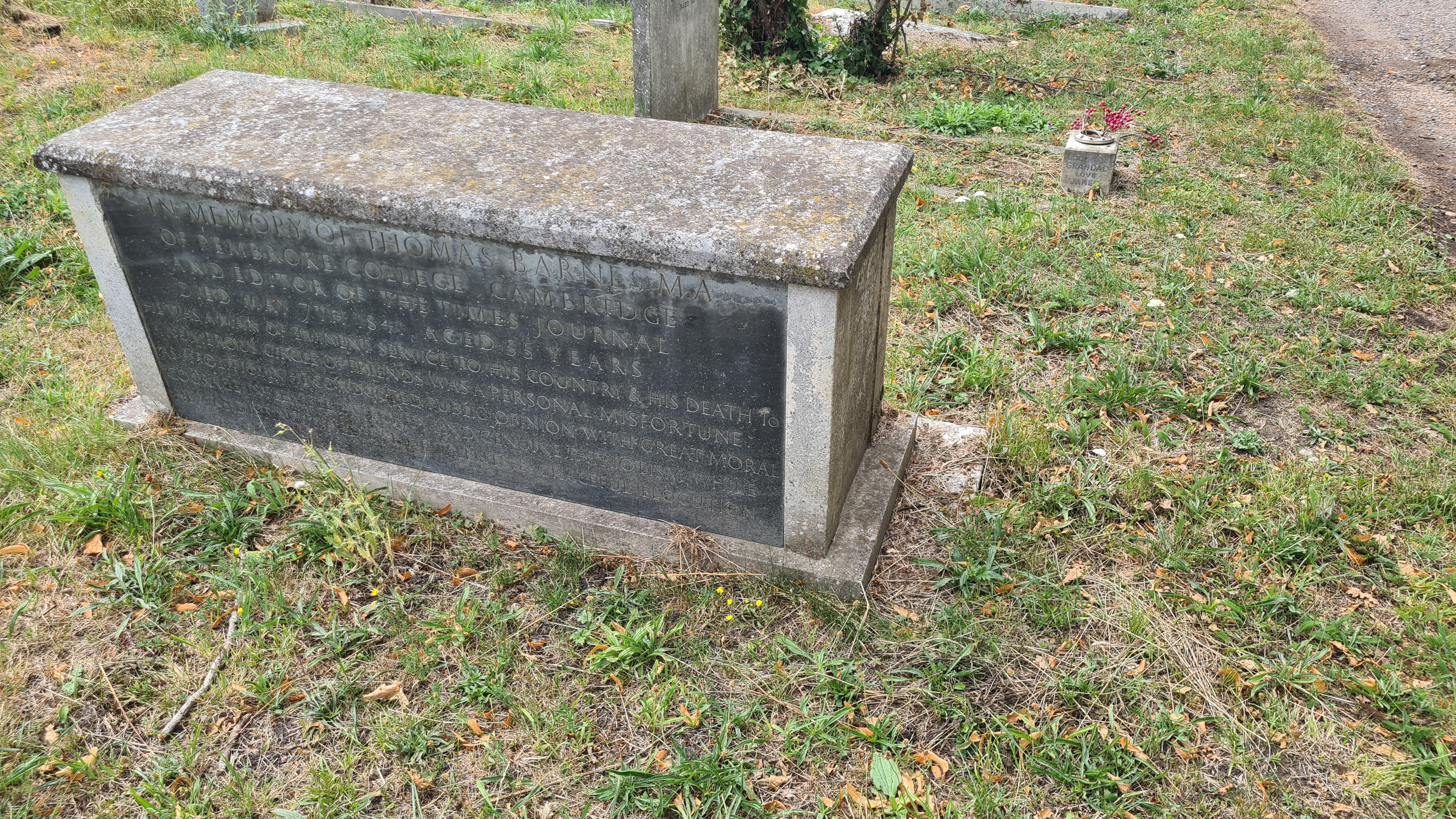
Tomb of Thomas Barnes at Kensal Green Cemetery, London

Thomas Barnes (11 September 1785 – 7 May 1841) was an English journalist, essayist, and editor. He is best known for his work with The Times which he edited from 1817 until his death in 1841.

== Early life and education ==
Barnes was the eldest son of John Barnes, a solicitor, and his wife Mary, née Anderson. After his mother's death, Barnes was raised by his grandmother before beginning his education at Christ's Hospital. When the school moved to Horsham in 1902 he had a boarding house named after him. While he was there he was a contemporary of Leigh Hunt and Thomas Mitchell, later a prominent academic. From there Barnes went up to Pembroke College, Cambridge, where he excelled both academically and athletically. While at Pembroke, Barnes studied classics, and he took his degree in 1808 as head of the senior optimes.

After considering a career as an academic, Barnes acceded to his family's wishes and embarked on a career in the law, moving to London in 1809 and entering the Inner Temple. While working at his new profession, Barnes joined the famous literary circle of which Hunt, Charles Lamb and William Hazlitt were prominent members. Barnes enjoyed the entertainments of the West End, and he indulged his appetites frequently, much to the detriment of his physical appearance.

== Career in journalism ==
With his legal career characterised by drudgery, Barnes sought an outlet for his talents. He found this through his friendship with Barron Field, who was the theatre critic for The Times. Through Field, Barnes met John Walter, who soon employed Barnes as a journalist reporting on law cases, politics and the theatre. Upon Field's retirement Barnes succeeded him as theatre critic, and in 1811 he became a member of the parliamentary staff. As part of his duties he penned a number of parliamentary sketches, which were later collected and published in a book, Parliamentary Portraits, in 1815. During this period, he also wrote for Leigh Hunt's publications the Examiner and the Reflector.

=== Editor of The Times ===
Walter's trust in Barnes was soon demonstrated when in 1815 Walter empowered him revise the controversial leading articles written by the intemperate John Stoddart, then the editor of the paper. Upon Stoddart's dismissal at the end of 1816 Barnes was named as his successor as editor, assuming a position which he held until his death. As editor, Barnes came to enjoy a greater degree of control over the paper than his predecessors, and received a share of ownership in the paper. He used it to reshape the paper, analysing events rather than merely summarising them, and making the leading article a central component of the paper. With the Peterloo Massacre in August 1819 he inaugurated a policy of support for the Whig opposition in Parliament that contrasted with his predecessor's staunchly pro-Tory stance. He became a close friend of Henry Brougham, who was an important source of information for Barnes's leading articles.

During Barnes's editorship, the influence and the scope of The Times grew, and with it its prominence in public affairs. Moved by what he saw during a trip to Ireland, Barnes became a passionate supporter of Catholic Emancipation. By the early 1830s his paper had earned the nickname "The Thunderer", with Robert Peel declaring it to be "a powerful advocate of Reform" and his colleague Lord Lyndhurst describing Barnes as "the most powerful man in the country." It was during this period that Barnes shifted politically, opposing the Poor Law Amendment Act 1834 and falling out with Brougham.

Barnes feuded with Lord Palmerston, who manipulated public opinion to enhance his control of foreign affairs. Palmerston leaked secrets to the press, published selected documents, and released letters to give himself more control and more publicity, all the while stirring up British nationalism. Barnes refused to play along with his propaganda ploys.

== Personal life ==
Though Barnes never married, he had a relationship for over two decades with Dinah Mary Mondet. Together they lived at 49 Nelson Square Southwark, London from 1821 to 1836 and then at 25 Soho Square, London. After Barnes's death in 1841, Dinah Mondet continued to live in their home in Soho Square until her own death in 1852, after which she was buried next to Barnes in Kensal Green Cemetery. It is probable (from correspondence with the volume, between A. N. L. Munby and the Archivist of The Times, in 1971) that an auction catalogue of 'A valuable collection of books ... comprising the library of an editor, deceased' and sold by Mr Fletcher on 11-13 May 1842 represents Barnes's library, sold by 'the administratrix', presumably Mondet. A copy of the catalogue is at Cambridge University Library (shelfmark Munby.c.155(29)).

Media offices
Preceded by John Stoddart	Editor of The Times; 1817–1841	Succeeded by John Thadeus Delane
