= John Stoddart (journalist) =

- Born: 6 February 1773; Salisbury, England
- Died: 16 February 1856 (aged 83); London, England
- Education: Christ Church, Oxford
- Occupation(s): Author, editor and judge
- Spouse: Isabella Moncrieff (m. 1803; died 1846)
- Relatives: Sarah Stoddart Hazlitt (sister)

Sir John Stoddart (6 February 1773 – 16 February 1856) was an English journalist and lawyer, who served as editor of The Times.

== Biography ==
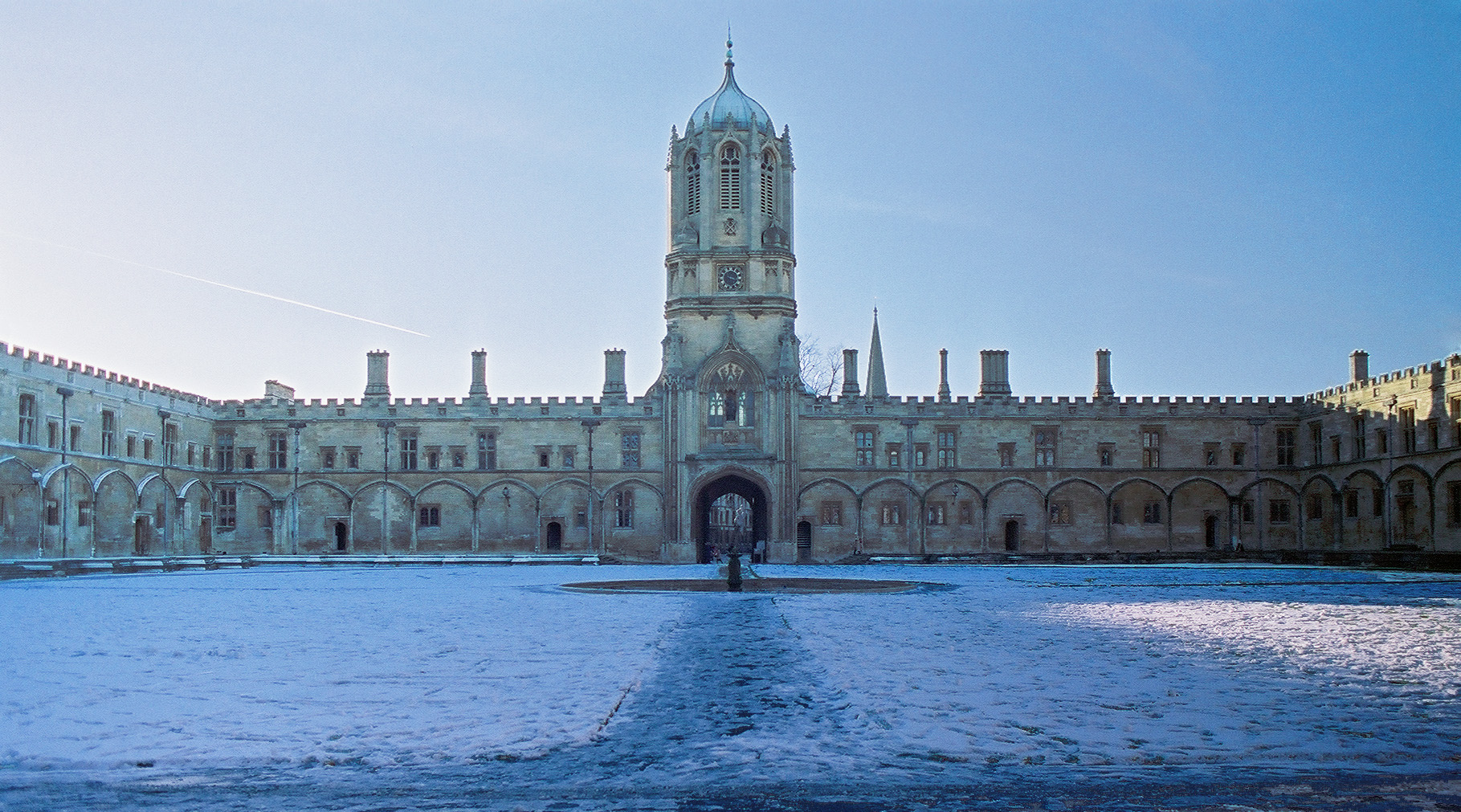
Christ Church, Oxford

Stoddart, who was born at Salisbury, was the eldest son of John Stoddart, who was a lieutenant in the Royal Navy. His only sister, Sarah, married, on 1 May 1808, William Hazlitt. Stoddart was educated at Salisbury Grammar School, and, subsequently, at Christ Church, Oxford, at which he matriculated on 25 October 1790, and graduated B.A. in 1794, B.C.L. in 1798, and D.C.L. in 1801. He was admitted as a member of the College of Advocates in 1801, and from 1803 to 1807 he was the Advocate of the Crown and of the Admiralty at Malta. During his time in Malta Stoddart was visited by Samuel Taylor Coleridge.

=== Journalism ===
Stoddart subsequently returned to England to practice in the Doctors' Commons. In 1810, he started an association with The Times, for which he served as a leader-writer from 1812. In April 1814, Stoddart entered into an agreement with John Walter, the owner of The Times, to become the editor of the newspaper. The staunch Tory sympathy of Stoddart's articles provoked censure, but Stoddart refused Walter's requests that he moderate his tone, and, consequently, Walter authorised Thomas Barnes, then a reporter, to edit Stoddart's leading articles. However, Stoddart's political intemperacy increased until he was dismissed by Walter in winter 1816. Barnes became his successor.

Two months later, Stoddart started a rival daily to The Times, entitled The New Times, which was shortly amalgamated with the Day. For a short time it appeared as the Day and New Times, but the first half of the title was removed in 1818, and survived as the New Times until about 1828. During the period of his editorship, Stoddart was scurrilously known as "Dr. Slop", and was the subject of several satires, of which A Slap at Slop (1820) had four editions.

=== Judicial career ===
His connection with the New Times probably ceased in 1826, when he was appointed chief justice and justice of the Vice-Admiralty Court in Malta. On 27 July he was knighted by George IV at St. James's Palace. Stoddart learned Italian because the Maltese complained that former judges had been imperfectly acquainted with the languages spoken on the island. He published in three parts, between 1830 and 1832, Trial by Jury: a Speech on the Opening of a Commission in Malta for establishing a modified Trial by Jury, translated from the Italian. During an outbreak of cholera on the island, he contributed to its successful suppression. Readers can also refer to 'Essays on Governing Malta (1813-1835)'(Vol II) by Patrick G Staines (2015)(University of Malta Library) where there is an entire Chapter about Stoddart's tenure as Chief Justice in Malta.

=== Later years in England ===
Stoddart returned to England in 1840. He studied etymological theory, which he believed would supplant that of Horne Tooke, and published the first part of the same, in a work named Glossology, or the Historical Relations of Languages, in 1858 in the Encyclopædia Metropolitana. He died at 13 Brompton Square, London.

== Personal life ==
On 1 August 1803, John Stoddart married Isabella Moncrieff, who was the eldest daughter of the Reverend Sir Henry Wellwood-Moncreiff, 8th Baronet (1750–1828), and Susan Robertson Barclay. Lady Isabella Moncrieff was born on 31 March 1774, and died on 2 February 1846. She wrote several novels under the pseudonym "Mrs. Martha Blackford".

At his death in 1856, the Annual Register reported that John Stoddart left "a very numerous family". A Register of the Scholars Admitted into Merchant Taylors' School (1883) includes four Stoddarts as pupils. Henry Moncrieff Stoddart, born 23 July 1808, is identified as the eldest son of Sir John Stoddart. The register notes that he entered Charterhouse School in 1817 and "died while a monitor at school". William Wellwood Stoddart (b. 9 November 1809), also entered Charterhouse in 1817. He became vicar of Charlbury, Oxfordshire, and died at Genoa on 21 Nov. 1856. Thomas Robertson Stoddart, who is identified as the third son of Sir John Stoddart, "died young." There was another son, Charles Benson Earle Stoddart (b. 8 May 1816).

Another son, John Frederick, became a member of the Scottish bar in 1827, a judge in Ceylon in 1836, and died of a jungle fever while on circuit on 29 Aug. 1839 (Gent. Mag. 1840, i. 110).

One daughter, Isabella Maxwell Stoddart, married Captain George Whitmore at Malta, on 22 February 1827. Another, Mary Anne Stoddart, married Francis Baring Atkinson at Malta on 24 December 1831, and died bearing a child at Marseilles, 29 November 1832.

Burke's Genealogical and Heraldic Dictionary of the Peerage and Baronetage (1865) mentions only one daughter, (Isabella) Whitmore, and three sons, John-Frederick, William, Thomas.

== Publications ==
Stoddart published in 1801 Remarks on the Local Scenery and Manners of Scotland, London, 2 vols. 8vo. Of his writings on legal subjects, the most important was A Letter to Lord Brougham, one in the minority of the law lords by whom the great Irish marriage case, Queen v. Millis, was decided in 1844, and, as Stoddart endeavored to show, erroneously decided. On this case he also published in 1844 a pamphlet entitled Irish Marriage Question: Observations on the Opinions delivered by Lord Cottenham in the Irish Marriage Case, 1844. His legal acumen was also shown in his article "The Head of the Church" in the Law Review, February 1851, pp. 418–36. He translated from the French of Joseph Despaze The Five Men, or a review of the Proceedings and Principles of the Executive Directory of France, with the lives of the present Members, (1797); and, with Georg Heinrich Noehden, Schiller's Fiesco, (1796), and Don Carlos, (1798). To the quarto edition of the Encyclopædia Metropolitana he contributed "Grammar" (i. 1–193), and the introductory chapter on "The Uses of History as a Study" (ix. 1–80); and to the octavo edition, 1850, an introduction to the Study of Universal History, besides "Glossology" in 1858.

Media offices
Preceded by John Walter (2nd)	Editor of The Times; 1812–1816	Succeeded by Thomas Barnes
