= Phyllis Holtby =

Canadian musician and educator

Phyllis Holtby (December 10, 1906 – March 21, 1993) was a Canadian musician and educator.

The daughter of John Hamilton Holtby and Annie Walker, she was born in Winnipeg and studied there with Bernard Naylor and Eva Clare, in New York City with Sigismond Stojowski and Ernest Hutcheson and in Duluth with Frank Mannheimer. Holtby also studied harpsichord in Winnipeg. She performed with the CBC Winnipeg Orchestra, the Duluth Symphony Orchestra and the Grand Forks Symphony Orchestra. She also gave piano and harpsichord recitals and performed on CBC Radio. She lectured on pedagogy at the University of North Dakota and was an examiner for the University of Manitoba. From 1971 to 1974, she was president of the Manitoba Registered Music Teachers' Association.

In 1988, she was named Woman of the Year for Manitoba in the arts category by the Winnipeg YM-YWCA.

Her students included Rémi Bouchard, Scott Baker, Thelma Harper, Peggy Kennedy, Kevin Kowal, Arlene Powell, Margaret Randell, Rupert Ross, Tom Stevenson (the first Canadian First Nations person to receive the Associate of The Royal Conservatory (ARCT)) and June Stinson.

Holtby died in Winnipeg at the age of 86.
