= Isabella Moncrieff =

Scottish writer

- Born: 7 April 1774
- Died: 2 February 1846 (aged 71)
- Occupation: Writer
- Spouse: John Stoddart (m. 1803)
- Parent: Henry Moncreiff-Wellwood (father)
- Writing career
- Pen name: Martha Blackford
- Notable works: The Eskdale Herd-Boy (1819); The Scottish Orphans: A Moral Tale (1822)

Lady Isabella Moncrieff (7 April 1774 – 2 February 1846), who wrote under the name of Martha Blackford, was a Scottish writer who wrote numerous children's books, such as the Eskdale Herd-Boy. Her books had moral themes and were set in the Scottish countryside, sometimes against a historical backdrop. She later wrote for an older audience with the Annals of the Family of McRoy. She became Lady Isabella when her husband John Stoddart was knighted in 1826.

== Early life ==
Isabella Moncrieff was born in Blackford, Perthshire on 7 April 1774 to Reverend Henry Moncrieff-Wellwood and Susan Robinson Barclay. The family moved to Edinburgh in 1775 when her father took over as minister of St Cuthbert's Church (then generally called the West Kirk).

In 1803, she married Sir John Stoddart. Stoddart was a journalist who was later appointed Chief Justice of Malta and justice of the vice-admiralty court. Moncrieff became known as Lady Stoddart in 1826, when Stoddart was knighted by George IV at St. James's Palace.

== Writing career ==
In 1819, she published her first book The Eskdale Herd-Boy under the pen name of Martha Blackford. The subtitle of the book refers to the aim of "instructing young people" and to this Moncrieff further explained that her purpose was to create characters that could "impress on the minds of her young readers, the permanent advantages of early integrity and gratitude". The American Sunday School Magazine criticised the portrayal of characters that were "not always the most natural" and labelled the work as "deficient" and therefore stated it was not suitable for young audiences. On the other hand, The London Magazine called it "a very superior work, and we have read it ourselves with much interest" and Chronicle of the Times mentioned her as having acquired an "enviable standing in the literary circles".

In 1822 she published The Scottish Orphans: A Moral Tale, which is set at the times of the Jacobite rising of 1745. She explained in the introduction that she was motivated by "having been eagerly solicited by her two nephews" to write again and thinking of the interest the Jacobite rebellion could have in juvenile readers. She then continued to publish moral tales and in a promotion of Annals of the Family of McRoy she restated her "earnest desire to contribute toward improving the principles and correcting the errors of the rising generation". Nevertheless, in Annals of the Family of McRoy she changed her focus to older characters, in this case following two women leaving their maternal home, so as to provide "instruction and amusement" to older audiences.

Most of her novels are set in Scotland. Moncrieff explained that she did this in order to get English readers to have a sense of "the manners and habits of their northern neighbors" and to impress them with "the grandeur of the Scottish scenery".

== Personal life and death ==
Moncreiff and Stoddart had "a very numerous family". Their son Henry Moncrieff Stoddart, born in 1808, died while a pupil of Charterhouse School in 1817. Another son, Thomas Robertson Stoddart, "died young". William Wellwood Stoddart, born in 1809, became vicar of Charlbury, Oxfordshire. Charles Benson Earle Stoddart was born in 1816. John Frederick became a member of the Scottish bar in 1827, a judge in Ceylon (now Sri Lanka) in 1836, and died of a jungle fever in 1839. One daughter, Isabella Maxwell Stoddart, married Captain George Whitmore at Malta in 1827. Another, Mary Anne Stoddart, married Francis Baring Atkinson at Malta on in 1831, and died bearing a child at Marseille in 1832.

Moncreiff died in Pelham Palace in London on 2 February 1846, and was survived by her husband and many of their children.

== Books ==
- The Eskdale Herd-Boy (1819)
- The Scottish Orphans: a Moral Tale (1822)
- Arthur Monteith: a Moral Tale (1822)
- Annals of the Family of McRoy (1823)
- The Young Artist (1825)
- William Montgomery (1829)
- The Orphans of Waterloo (1844)
