= Eva Clare =

Canadian musician and educator (1884–1961)

Eva Clare (February 18, 1885 – March 29, 1961) was a Canadian musician and educator.

The daughter of James A. Clare and Agnes McLean, she was born in Neepawa, Manitoba and was educated there and went on to study piano in Winnipeg. Clare continued her studies in Berlin with Olga Varet-Stepanoff and Josef Lhévinne, and then, during World War I, with Ernest Hutcheson and Howard Brockway in New York City. She taught in Regina, Saskatchewan, later settling in Winnipeg in 1918.

Clare performed in Prague, Munich, Vienna, Budapest, Toronto, London, Scranton, New York, Vancouver and throughout western Canada. She played an important role in establishing the Manitoba Music Teachers' Association and served as first provincial president. Clare helped assemble the first graded books for piano examinations for the Western Board of Music. From 1937 to 1949, she was musical director at the University of Manitoba.

Her pupils included Barbara Pentland, Phyllis Holtby, Anna Moncrieff Hovey, Helga and Snjolaug Sigurdson, Lilja Palsson Martin, Beth Cooil and Frank Thorolfson.

In 1924, she published Musical Appreciation and the Studio Club.

She died in Winnipeg at the age of 76.

Eva Clare Hall at the University of Manitoba was named in her honour.
