= Anna Moncrieff Hovey =

Canadian pianist and educator

Anna Blyth Moncrieff Hovey (August 1902 – January 27, 1995) was a Canadian pianist and educator.

The daughter of John J. Moncrieff, she was born Anna Blyth Moncrieff in Winnipeg and studied with Mary L. Robertson, J.W. Matthews and Eva Clare. Hovey performed on the first broadcast of radio station CKY Winnipeg and, in 1932, at the first concert held in the Winnipeg Auditorium. She was accompanist for artists such as Bronislaw Huberman, Betty-Jean Hagen, Zara Nelsova and Kathleen Parlow when they performed in Winnipeg.

Hovey was a charter member of the Manitoba Registered Music Teachers' Association and taught privately in Winnipeg.

She married Lindsay Hovey.

She died at the age of 92.
