= Henry Moncreiff-Wellwood =

Church of Scotland minister (1750–1827)

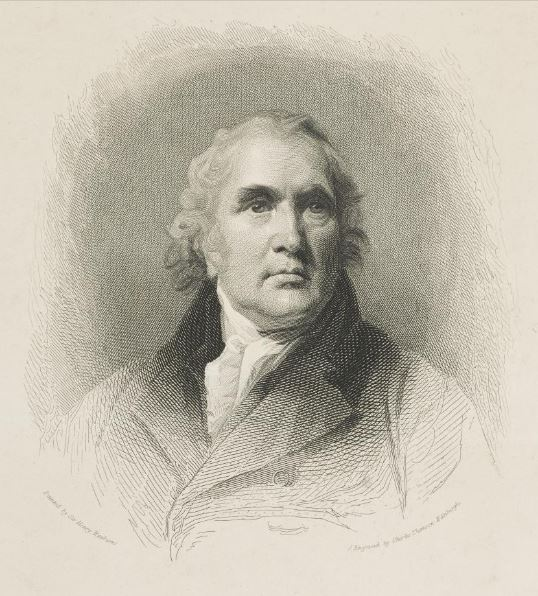
- Born: 6 February 1750
- Died: 9 August 1827 (aged 77)
- Education: University of Glasgow; University of Edinburgh
- Spouse: Susan Robertson Barclay (m. 1772; died 1826)
- Parents: Sir William Moncreiff, Baronet; Catherine Wellwood
- Church: Church of Scotland
- Ordained: 15 August 1771
- Offices held: Moderator of the General Assembly of the Church of Scotland; Chaplain in Ordinary to King George III

Henry Moncreiff-Wellwood 8th Baronet of Tullibole FRSE (6 February 1750–9 August 1827) was both a baronet in the Baronetage of Nova Scotia and minister of the Church of Scotland who served as Moderator of the General Assembly of the Church of Scotland in 1785. At age only 35 he was one of the youngest-ever moderators. He served as Chaplain to King George III in Scotland.

== Life ==
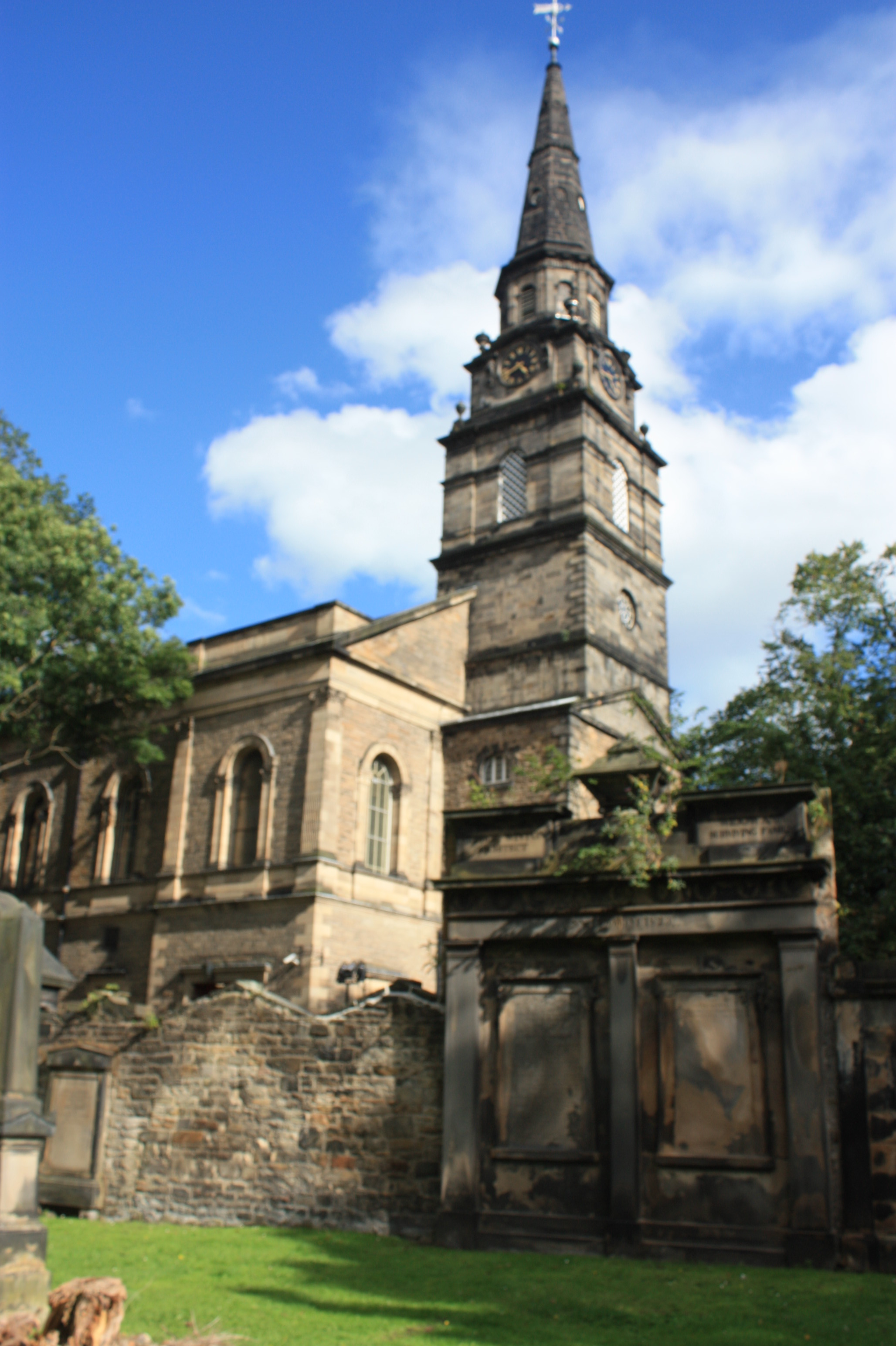
St Cuthbert's Church, Edinburgh as seen from Moncrieff-Wellwood's grave

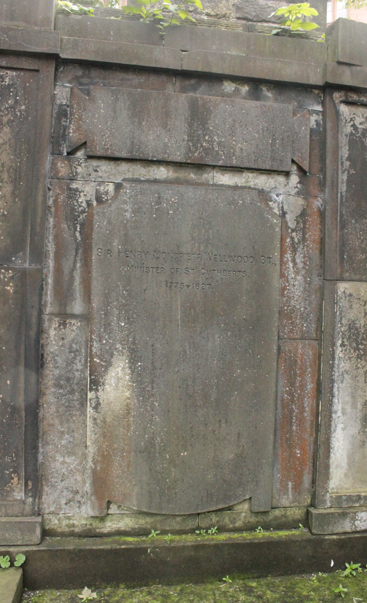
The Grave of Sir Henry Moncrieff-Wellwood, St Cuthbert's Churchyard

He was born Henry Wellwood Moncreiff at Blackford manse in Perthshire on 6 February 1750, the eldest son of Catherine Wellwood and Sir William Moncreiff, Baronet, who was minister of the parish.

After a local education he studied at the University of Glasgow from 1763. He then studied divinity at the University of Edinburgh. On the death of his father it was established that he should fill the role of minister in his stead but he was not yet old enough. In 1768 he removed to the University of Edinburgh to complete his studies.

He was ordained by the Presbytery of Auchterarder on 15 August 1771 aged 21 and began preaching in Blackford. His talent outstripped this tiny parish and in 1775 he successfully obtained the patronage of his uncle to take over as minister of St Cuthbert's Church, Edinburgh (then generally called the West Kirk). He was first suggested as Moderator of the General Assembly in 1780, but lost to the much older Rev Harry Spens. He was, however, elected moderator in 1785 still aged only 35.

In 1793 he was made Chaplain in Ordinary to King George III in Scotland. In 1796 he was elected a Fellow of the Royal Society of Edinburgh. His proposers were Andrew Dalzell, James Gregory and Rev William Greenfield.

He was a member of the Sons of the Clergy. He lived his later life at 13 Queen Street.

He died at Bruntsfield Links on 9 August 1827 following a long illness (compounded by the death of his wife). He is buried in the north-west corner of the northern section of St Cuthbert's Churchyard.

== Family ==
In November 1772, Sir Henry was married to Susan Robertson Barclay (d.1826), his cousin and the daughter of James Robertson Barclay WS of Cavell. Their eldest son, William Moncrieff-Wellwood LLD, was Advocate for the Admiralty and died in Malta in 1813. Their daughter Isabella Moncrieff was a writer of children books who married John Stoddart (later Sir John Stoddart of the Admiralty).

On his death, the baronetcy passed to his second son, James Moncrieff-Wellwood (b.1776).

His sister, Susan Moncreiff, married Rev William Paul, his counterpart in the collegiate section of St Cuthbert's.

== Publications ==
- Sermons Preached 1805-1806
- Discourses on the Evidences of the Jewish and Christian Revelations (1815)
- A Life of Dr John Erskine (1818)

== Artistic recognition ==
He was painted by Sir Henry Raeburn and an engraving was made by Thomson for wider use of the image.

Baronetage of Nova Scotia
Preceded by William Moncreiff	Baronet (of Moncreiff); 1767–1827	Succeeded by James Wellwood Moncreiff
