= Barbara Pentland =

Canadian composer

Barbara Pentland CM
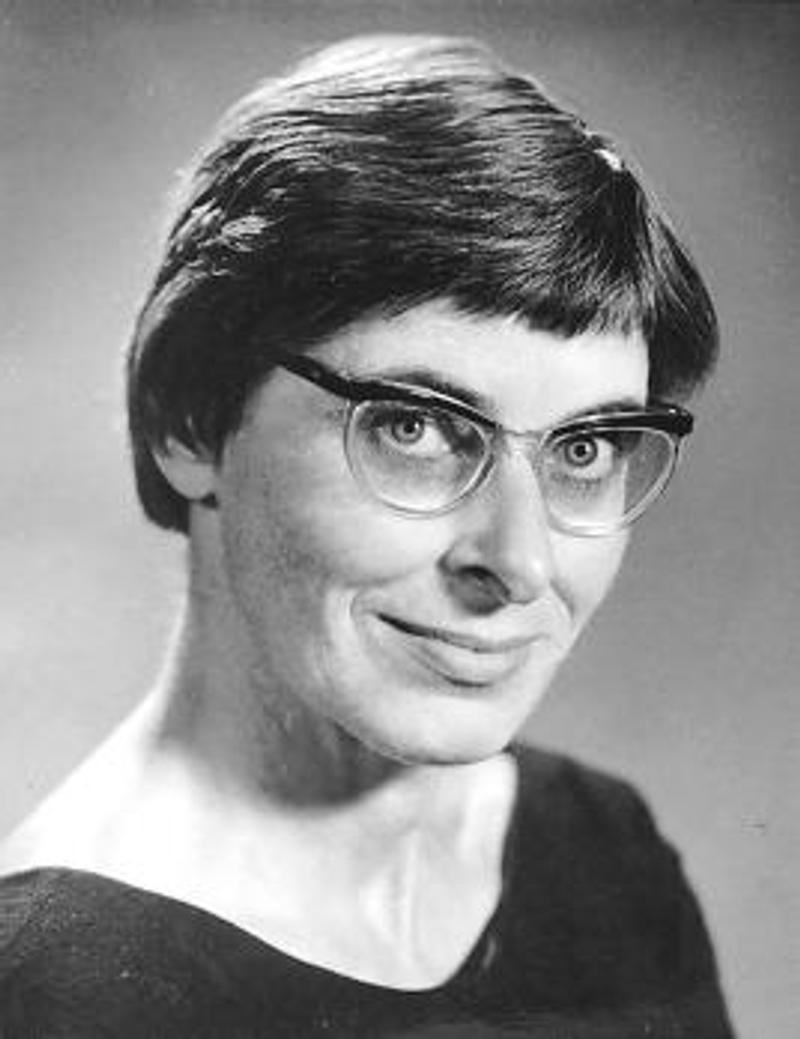
- Pentland in 1967
- Born: 2 January 1912; Winnipeg, Manitoba, Canada
- Died: 5 February 2000 (aged 88); Vancouver, British Columbia, Canada
- Education: Juilliard School of Music
- Occupation: Composer

Barbara Pentland C.M. (2 January 1912 – 5 February 2000) was one of the pre-eminent members of the generation of Canadian composers who came to artistic maturity in the years after World War II.

== Life and career ==
=== Early life and education ===
Born in Winnipeg, Manitoba, Pentland suffered from a heart disorder which significantly limited both her physical and social activities during her childhood. As a result, she devoted much of her time from an early age to academic pursuits and other intellectual activities. At the age of 9 she began studying the piano in her native city at the Rupert's Land Girls' School. She soon developed an interest in music composition but her early ventures into this area were strongly discouraged by both her teacher and her relatively wealthy and conservative family, who viewed the pursuit as an eccentric hobby that was "too exciting for a delicate child." Pentland's parents, especially her mother, intended for their daughter to adopt their values and pursue a life spent amongst the upper classes of Canadian high society, rather than a career as a professional composer.

Despite her family's objections, Pentland continued to compose privately as a young teenager. She finally was encouraged in this pursuit by one of her teachers, the organist and conductor Frederick H. Blair, who taught her piano and music theory while she attended boarding school at Miss Edgar's and Miss Cramp's School in Montreal from 1927 to 1929. In 1929, Pentland was surprised when her parents finally allowed her to study composition with Cécile Gauthiez, professor of harmony at the Schola Cantorum in Paris. Under Gauthiez's tutelage, Pentland received a formal, conservatory style music education, including lessons in form, harmony, and analysis by composers such as Cesar Franck, Vincent d'Indy, and Ludwig van Beethoven.

On a trip to Fontainebleau, Pentland found herself outside of the Fontainbleau Schools of Music, where she would sit underneath open windows listening to performances or rehearsals, and further dreaming of being able to participate herself. Pentland eventually returned to Winnipeg, and continued to take lessons from Gauthiez through written correspondence. Unfortunately, her professional wishes and those of her parents still did not align, and they made it increasingly clear that they expected Barbara to give up composition, settle down, and get married. After a disastrous debutante ball, Pentland spent six years focusing on music, including composing, learning new instruments, and performing. She formed a piano trio with Margaret Mitchell on violin and Charlotte McConnell on cello, give her a new avenue to perform music. As a result, she purchased a violin for $3.50 and taught herself to play; it is no coincidence that many of her pieces from this period included string instruments.

After her parents refusal to finance her musical education thwarted Pentland's plans to study at the Eastman School of Music, she began taking lessons with two new teachers, H. Hugh Bancroft (organ) and Eva Clare (piano). In 1935, Pentland fell seriously ill and spent three months in the hospital, but returning to her unhappy home did nothing to aid her recovery. She then traveled to Victoria, where she once again buoyed her spirits before yet another return to Winnipeg. At Eva Clare's suggestion, Pentland sent several of her compositions to both composer Ralph Vaughan Williams and the editor of Musical America, Walter Kramer.

In 1936, Pentland entered the graduate music program at the Juilliard School in New York City where she studied 16th-century counterpoint with Frederick Jacobi and modern composition techniques with Bernard Wagenaar through 1939. During these years, her own compositions took on a language that was primarily neoclassical, showing the influence of Paul Hindemith, Igor Stravinsky, and later Aaron Copland, with whom she studied at the Tanglewood Music Center during summers in 1941 and 1942. Her work was part of the music event in the art competition at the 1948 Summer Olympics.

=== Compositional Style ===
One of Pentland's first known works is her four-movement Sonate (1930), which her biographer Sheila Eastman described as being clearly influenced by her knowledge of Beethoven and his music. Neoclassicism was very popular during this time, particularly in France, and Pentland's writing in the Sonate reflects this style.

Pentland's compositional language began to shift away from Neoclassicism in 1955 when she encountered the work of Anton Webern for the first time while visiting Darmstadt. Although she never became a strict serial composer in Webern's manner, she did adapt elements of his style and technique into her new "free atonal" musical language. It is the work of this period which is regarded as her finest, being described by musicologist David Gordon Duke as music that "drew on the textures and organizational principles of the Webern school but was suffused with a lyricism that was expressly individual".

Although Pentland's position at the forefront of the Canadian musical avant-garde was recognized during her lifetime, her career was also marked by substantial struggle. As a woman composer of 'difficult' music, she met with resistance from male performers and was often treated dismissively by fellow composers. Her academic career was relatively brief; she left her post at the University of British Columbia because of conflict with the department chair on the issue of academic standards. Following the end of her career (forced by ill health more than a decade before her death), Pentland fell into relative obscurity, overshadowed in discussions of Canadian music by her male contemporaries. Her works have nonetheless been recorded by such performers as Angela Hewitt (Studies in Line), Glenn Gould (Ombres/Shadows), and Robert Rogers (multiple works).

Pentland's centennial was celebrated with a 2012 concert series sponsored by the Canadian Music Centre (BC Region), and with a revival of her opera The Lake presented by Astrolabe Musik Theatre, the Turning Point Ensemble, and Westbank First Nation. That year, the CMC Centrediscs label also released Toccata, a recording of Pentland's compositions by pianist Barbara Pritchard.

In 1986, a six-record set of Pentland's music was included in the Anthology of Canadian Music Series. The Pentland portrait in the Canadian Composers Portraits series was released in 2003.

Pentland was an early member of the Canadian League of Composers and the Canadian Music Centre, which provides public access to a large number of her scores and recordings. Library and Archives Canada holds the Barbara Pentland fonds.

Pentland received an honorary doctorate from the University of Manitoba in 1976. She was appointed a Member of the Order of Canada in 1989 and a Member of the Order of British Columbia in 1993.

Pentland died in Vancouver on 5 February 2000, from Alzheimer's Disease.

== Selected works ==
- Studies in Line, piano (1941)
- Symphony no. 2 (1950)
- The Lake. One-act chamber opera (1952)
- Sonata, 2 pianos (1954)
- Concerto, piano, strings (1955–56)
- Symphony for 10 parts on YouTube (1957)
- Duo for viola and piano (1960)
- Variations for viola (1965)
- Suite Borealis, piano (1966)
- String Quartet no. 3 (1969)
- Disasters of the Sun, mezzo-soprano, 9 instruments, tape (1976)
- Quintet for piano, strings on YouTube (1983)

== See also ==
- Music of Canada
- List of Canadian composers
