= Rémi Bouchard =

Canadian composer and educator (1936–2019)

Rémi Gédéon Bouchard (March 15, 1936 – September 2, 2019) was a Canadian composer and educator.

The son of Ernest Bouchard and Alma Fradette, he was born in Laurier, Manitoba and studied piano with nuns there, going on to further studies in music with Gerald Death, Phyllis Holtby and Alfred Zimmerman. In 1956, he started teaching piano in Neepawa. He received a piano teacher's certificate from the University of Manitoba in 1960.

Bouchard first composed works for solo voice and choirs, as well as pieces used for teaching piano. A concert of his compositions for piano was given in 1976 in Winnipeg. Three years later, his Choral Fantasy on Haiku was performed in Finland. In 1986, he received the award for choral work at the Satori Festival of Contemporary Canadian Music. In 1988, Clavier magazine commissioned two pieces for piano which were included in that publication. His works have also been performed on CBC Radio. Bouchard has also served as an adjudicator for the Associated Manitoba Arts Festivals.

He published two books: Distant Voices: Memoirs of My Youth and Afterthoughts: A Career in Music Recollected.
