= John J. Moncrieff =

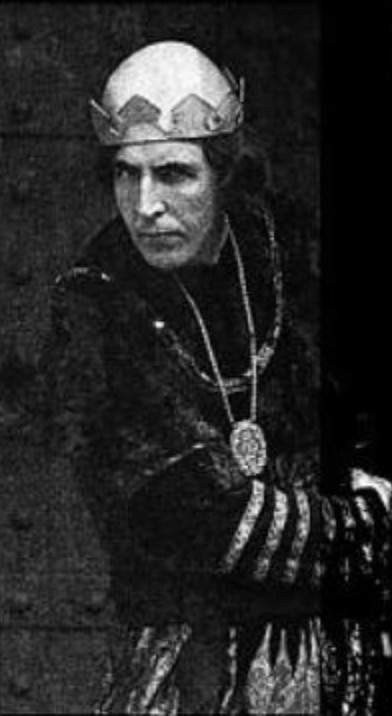
John Moncrieff as the King in Yolanda of Cyprus (1929)

John James Moncrieff (October 9, 1866 – April 11, 1939) was a Scottish-born Canadian journalist, singer and conductor.

The son of Lawrence Moncrieff, he was born in Scalloway in the Shetland Islands and came to St. Andrews in the Red River Colony with his family in 1875. He was educated in Winnipeg and began working as a clerk for the Hudson's Bay Company. In 1883, he apprenticed with a printer at Rat Portage (later Kenora, Ontario). Moncrieff was the first news editor for the Winnipeg Tribune; he was managing editor from 1903 to 1920 and associate editor from 1920 to 1936.

From 1906 to 1925, he was soloist and choirmaster at Augustine Church. In 1907, he became the first president of the Winnipeg Oratorio Society, also serving as conductor. He also was a founder of the Men's Music Club of Winnipeg.

He married May Blyth in 1888 and then Minnie Blyth in 1896. His daughter Anna was a well-known Winnipeg pianist.

Moncrieff died in Winnipeg at the age of 72.
