= Keith W. Moncrief =

American politician

Member of the New Hampshire House of Representatives from the Hillsborough 13th district
- In office 1992–1996

Personal details
- Party: Republican

Keith W. Moncrief is an American politician. He served as a member for the Hillsborough 13th district of the New Hampshire House of Representatives.
