= Baron Moncreiff =

Barony in the Peerage of the United Kingdom

Barony of Moncreiff
- Blazon: Arms: Quarterly: 1st and 4th, Argent a Lion rampant Gules armed and langued Azure a Chief Ermine (Moncreiff); 2nd and 3rd, Argent an Oak Tree issuing out of a Well in base proper (Wellwood).; Crests: A Demi-Lion rampant as in the Arms.; Supporters: On either side a Man armed cap-a-pie holding in the exterior hand a Spear resting on the shoulder all proper the breastplate charged with a Crescent Gules
- Creation date: 9 January 1874
- Created by: Queen Victoria
- Peerage: Peerage of the United Kingdom
- First holder: James Moncreiff, 1st Baron Moncreiff
- Present holder: Rhoderick Harry Wellwood Moncreiff, 6th Baron Moncreiff
- Heir apparent: the Hon. Harry James Wellwood Moncreiff
- Status: Extant
- Motto: SUR ESPERANCE (On hope)

Baron Moncreiff, of Tulliebole in the County of Kinross, is a title in the Peerage of the United Kingdom. It was created on 9 January 1874 for the lawyer and Liberal politician Sir James Moncreiff, 1st Baronet. He had already been created a Baronet, of Kilduff in the County of Kinross, in the Baronetage of the United Kingdom on 23 May 1871. In 1883 Lord Moncreiff also succeeded his elder brother as 11th Baronet, of Moncreiff in the County of Perth. On his death the titles passed to his eldest son, the second Baron. He was a Judge of the Court of Session from 1888 to 1905 under the title of Lord Wellwood and served as Lord Lieutenant of Kinross-shire between 1901 and 1909. He was succeeded by his younger brother, the third Baron. He was a clergyman. As of 2010 the titles are held by the latter's great-grandson, the sixth Baron, who succeeded his father in 2002.

The Moncreiff Baronetcy, of Moncreiff in the County of Perth, was created in the Baronetage of Nova Scotia in 1626 for John Moncreiff. The title was created with remainder to Moncreiff's heirs male whatsoever, which allowed it to be inherited by male relatives who were not his direct descendants. On the death of his younger son James, the fourth Baronet, there were no more male descendants of the first Baronet. The title instead passed to James's cousin John Moncreiff, who was the son of Hugh Moncreiff, youngest brother of the first Baronet. When his son Hugh, the sixth Baronet, died, this line of the family also failed. The title was inherited by his kinsman Reverend William Moncreiff, the seventh Baronet, a descendant of Archibald Moncreiff, uncle of the first Baronet. His son, the eighth Baronet, assumed the additional surname of Wellwood. He was succeeded by his son, the ninth Baronet. He was a Lord of Session. His younger son was the aforementioned eleventh Baronet, who was elevated to the peerage in 1874.

As of 30 June 2006, the present holder of the barony has not successfully proven his succession to the baronetcies and is therefore not on the Official Roll of the Baronetage. However, the case is under review by the Registrar of the Baronetage (for more information follow this link).

The family seat is Tullibole Castle in Kinross-shire.

== Baronets of Moncreiff (1626) ==
- Sir John Moncreiff, 1st Baronet (d. c. 1651)
- Sir John Moncreiff, 2nd Baronet (d. 1674)
- Sir David Moncreiff, 3rd Baronet (d. c. 1690
- Sir James Moncreiff, 4th Baronet (d. 1698)
- Sir John Moncreiff, 5th Baronet (c. 1628–1714)
- Sir Hugh Moncreiff, 6th Baronet (d. 1744)
- Sir William Moncreiff, 7th Baronet (d. 1767)
- Sir Henry Moncreiff-Wellwood, 8th Baronet (1750–1828)
- Sir James Wellwood-Moncreiff, 9th Baronet (c. 1776–1851)
- Sir Henry Wellwood-Moncreiff, 10th Baronet (1809–1883)
- Sir James Moncreiff, 11th Baronet (1811–1895) (had been created Baron Moncreiff in 1874)

== Barons Moncreiff (1874) ==
- James Moncreiff, 1st Baron Moncreiff (1811–1895)
- Henry James Moncreiff, 2nd Baron Moncreiff (1840–1909)
- Robert Chichester Moncreiff, 3rd Baron Moncreiff (1843–1913)
- James Arthur Fitzherbert Moncreiff, 4th Baron Moncreiff (1872–1942)
- Harry Robert Wellwood Moncreiff, 5th Baron Moncreiff (1915–2002)
- Rhoderick Harry Wellwood Moncreiff, 6th Baron Moncreiff (b. 1954)

The heir apparent is the present the holder's son, Harry James Wellwood Moncreiff (b. 1986)
