= Harry Spens =

Scottish minister

Harry Spens FRSE (c.1714–1787) was a Scottish minister who served as Moderator of the General Assembly of the Church of Scotland in 1780.

== Life ==
Spens was born in Edinburgh as the fourth child of James Spens of Alves, Moray and Anne Robertson. He completed his collegiate and graduate studies at King's College, Aberdeen, graduating with an MA in 1730. In the same year, he began his training for the ministry and was recorded at St Andrews assisting with a baptism for a child from his native parish of Alves.

Spens was licensed to preach by the presbytery of Dalkeith on October 3, 1738. He was ordained as a minister of the Church of Scotland in November 1744 and became minister of Wemyss, likely appointed by the Earl of Wemyss. He is noted to have sown 9 “lippies” of linseed on the church glebe (the land allocated to his manse).

In 1751, a pamphlet entitled An inquiry concerning a plan of a literary correspondence was anonymously published in Edinburgh. This document, composed as a series of questions about Plato's philosophy, theology, and life, called for scholars to join the authors in translating and commenting on the philosopher's works. The Inquiry has been attributed to Spens and John Chambers, minister of Elie.

Spens produced the first English translation of Plato's Republic in 1763. Printed in Glasgow by the Foulis Press, the work was dedicated to John Stuart, 3rd Earl of Bute, during his brief tenure as prime minister under King George III. The translation was reprinted in 1906 as part of the Everyman's Library collection.

Spens married Anne Duncan in 1765. The couple had a child named James in October 1771, who died within a month.

In 1770, Spens became involved in a notable case in the Scottish courts. A local of Wemyss, Dr. David Dalrymple, had returned from the West Indies with a negro slave, “Black Tom”, around 1767/8. The slave came to Spens in the middle of the night to be baptized a Christian, which would legally exempt him from chattel slavery. Spens assented, and baptized Tom under the name “David Spens". David left his master and went to work on a Wemyss farm. Dalrymple brought the case to court in January 1770. Upon Dalrymple's death in the following month, the case was abandoned and David remained free.

In 1778, he was minister of East Wemyss and nearby Buckhaven, both in Fife.

In October 1780, he was made Professor of Divinity at St Andrews University. When Anne died in 1781, he was recorded as living at Lathallan in St Andrews.

In 1783, Spens was a joint founder of the Royal Society of Edinburgh. He died in St Andrews in on 27 November 1787.
