= Alice Moncrieff =

American singer

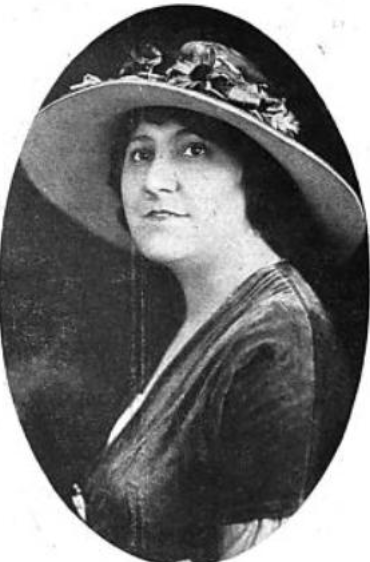
- Alice Moncrieff, from a 1921 publication
- Born: Mary Alice Magee; August 15, 1881; St. Louis, Missouri, U.S.
- Died: After 1952
- Occupations: Contralto singer, voice teacher, college professor

Alice Moncrieff (August 15, 1881 – died after 1952), born Mary Alice Magee, was an American contralto singer active in the 1910s and 1920s, and a professor of voice at the University of Kansas from 1926 to 1952.

== Early life and education ==
Mary Alice Magee was born in St. Louis, Missouri, the daughter of Alexander Magee and Mary Emma Kohlhoppe Magee. Her father served in the Union Army during the American Civil War. Her paternal grandparents were born in Ireland, and her maternal grandparents were born in Germany. She studied with Oscar Saenger and Yeatman Griffith.

== Career ==
Moncrieff, "a true contralto, resonant and colorful", sang in Canada and the United States in the 1910s and 1920s. She first appeared at New York's Aeolian Hall in December 1919. She performed as a soloist with the New York Symphony, the Russian Symphony, and the St. Louis Symphony, and she sang at the Stadium concerts in New York. She was also a church soloist, known for her oratorio work.

Moncrieff taught at Meredith College in North Carolina in 1923. and at Illinois Woman's College from 1924 to 1926. She became a professor of voice in the School of Fine Arts at the University of Kansas beginning in 1926. She also sang at campus events and concerts in Kansas. She retired with emeritus status from the University of Kansas in 1952.

== Personal life ==
Magee married engraver James Regal Moncrieff and had a daughter. The Moncrieffs move to New York City by 1910, and divorced; he remarried in 1924, and she listed herself as a widow in the 1930 and 1940 censuses.
