= Sir Henry Wellwood-Moncreiff, 10th Baronet =

Scottish Presbyterian minister

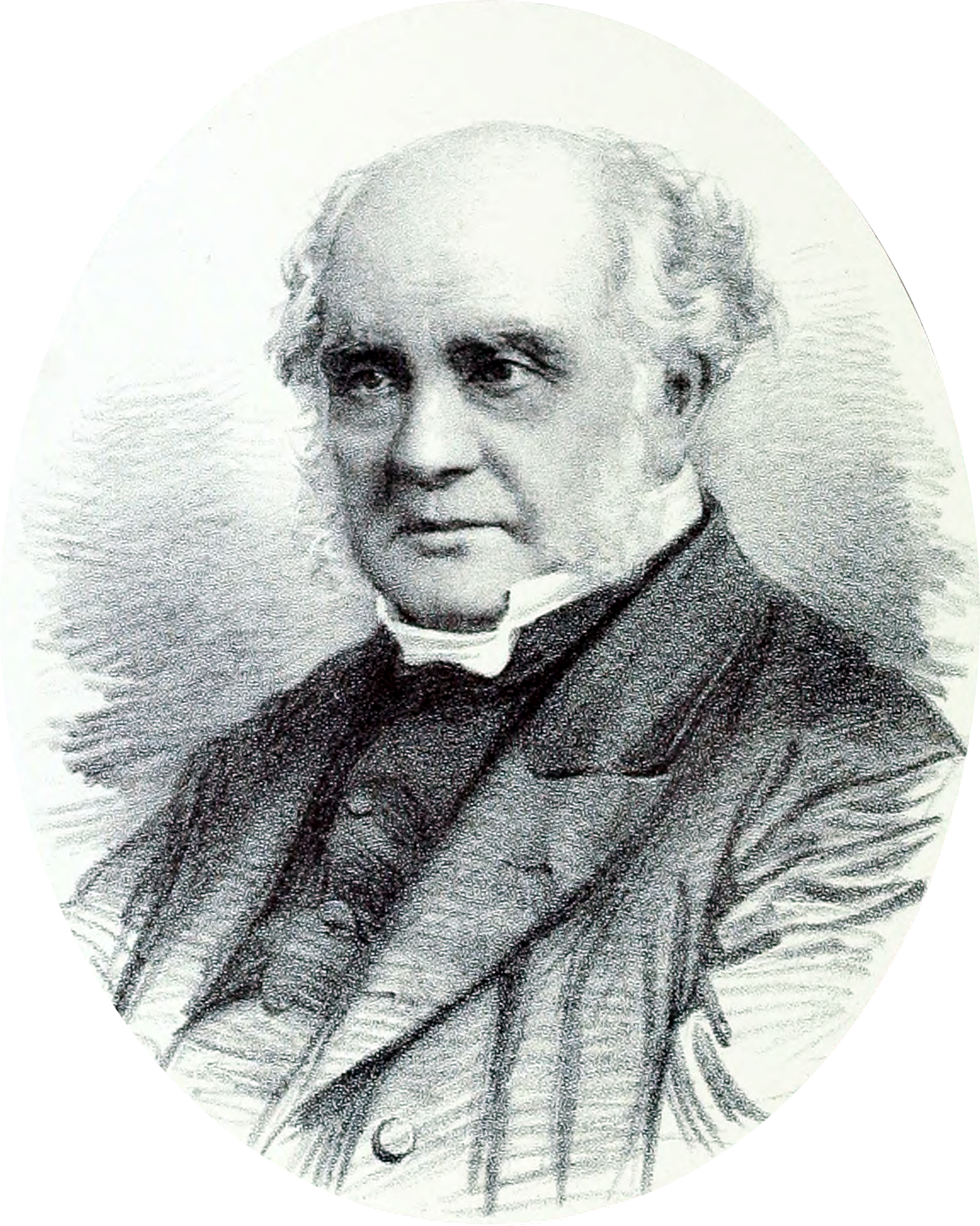
- Sir Henry Wellwood-Moncreiff from Disruption Worthies

Personal details
- Born: 21 May 1809 Edinburgh
- Died: 4 November 1883 (aged 74)

Sir Henry Wellwood-Moncreiff, 10th Baronet, originally Henry Moncrieff (21 May 1809 – 4 November 1883) was a Scottish minister, considered one of the most influential figures in the Free Church of Scotland in his time. Henry Wellwood Moncreiff, tenth baronet, born in 1809, was ordained minister of the parish of East Kilbride, Lanarkshire, in 1836, and at the disruption, in 1843, he joined the Free Church. He was afterwards translated to St. Cuthbert's, Edinburgh. He married in 1838, Alexina-Mary, daughter of Edinburgh surgeon George Bell. He is one of the two principal clerks of the General Assembly of the Free Church of Scotland, Patrick Clason, being the other; and on the death, in 1861, of James Robertson, professor of divinity and church history in the university of Edinburgh, he was appointed his successor as secretary to her majesty's sole and only master printers in Scotland.

== Life ==
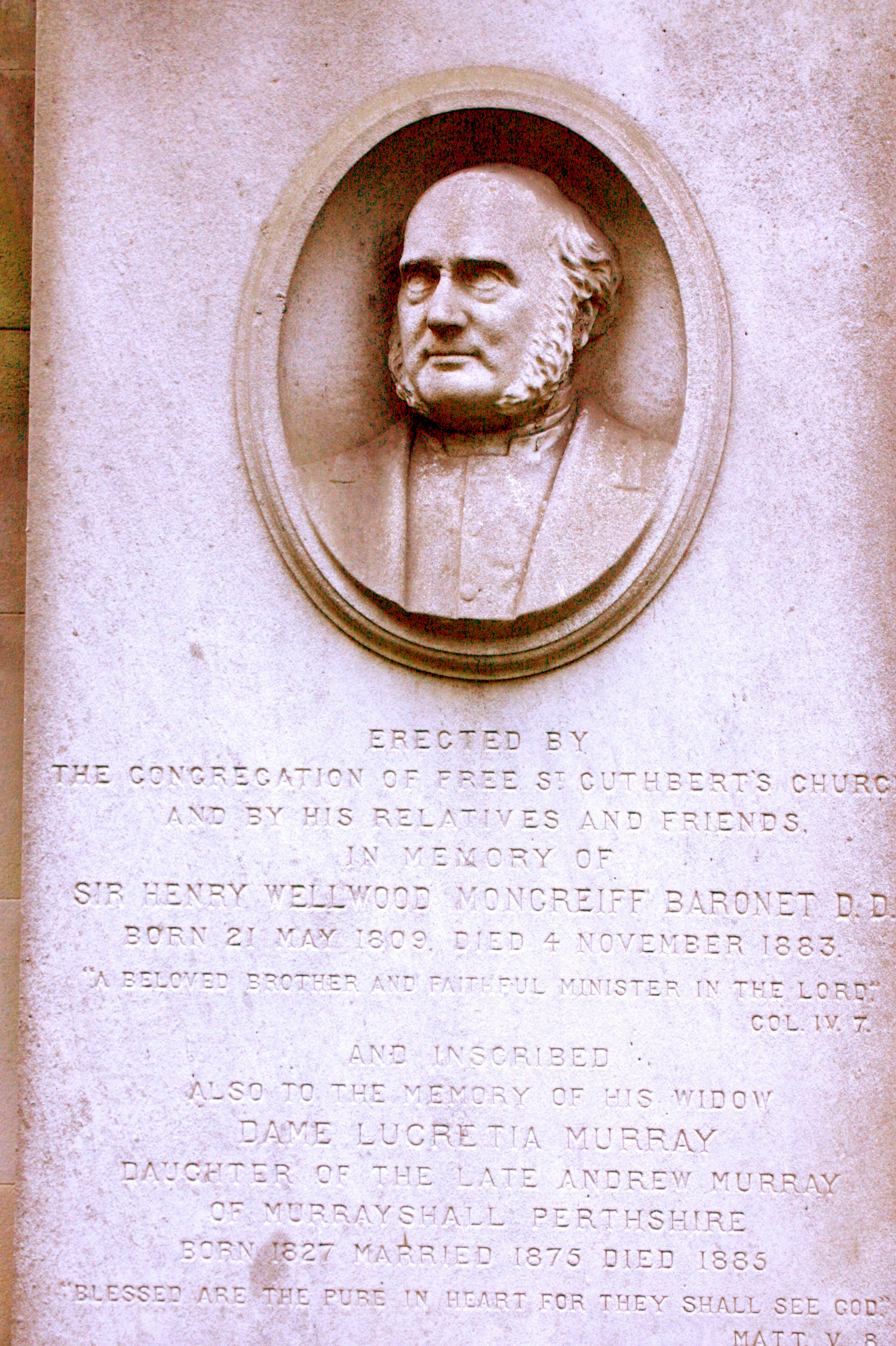
Grave of Henry Wellwood-Moncrieff in Dean Cemetery

Born at 22 Hanover Street in Edinburgh 21 May 1809, he was eldest son of James Moncreiff, Lord Moncreiff. He was educated at Edinburgh High School and the University of Edinburgh then (5 April 1827) matriculated at New College, Oxford (where he was president of the Oxford Union), where he graduated with a BA in 1831. While at Oxford he was on close terms with William Ewart Gladstone. Returning to Scotland he studied divinity under Thomas Chalmers, and was ordained minister of the parish of Baldernock in Stirlingshire in 1836. In the following year he moved to East Kilbride in Lanarkshire.

Moncreiff took part in the controversy which ended in the disruption of 1843. He joined the Free Church in June 1843, and from that date till 1852 he was the minister of Free East Kilbride. He succeeded to the baronetcy and assumed the name Wellwood on the death of his father in 1851. In 1852 he became minister of Free St. Cuthbert's in Edinburgh (his grandfather, Rev Sir Henry Moncreiff (1750–1827) had passed 50 years of his ministry at St Cuthbert's Church, Edinburgh). He was appointed joint principal clerk to the Free General Assembly in 1855, was created DD by the University of Glasgow in 1860, and appointed moderator of the Free church Assembly in 1869. In 1862 he was appointed secretary of the Bible Board, and held that office at his death, which took place 4 November 1883.

He is buried in Dean Cemetery Edinburgh with his second wife, Lucretia. The grave lies on the southern edge of the first north extension, backing onto the original central cemetery.

== Family ==
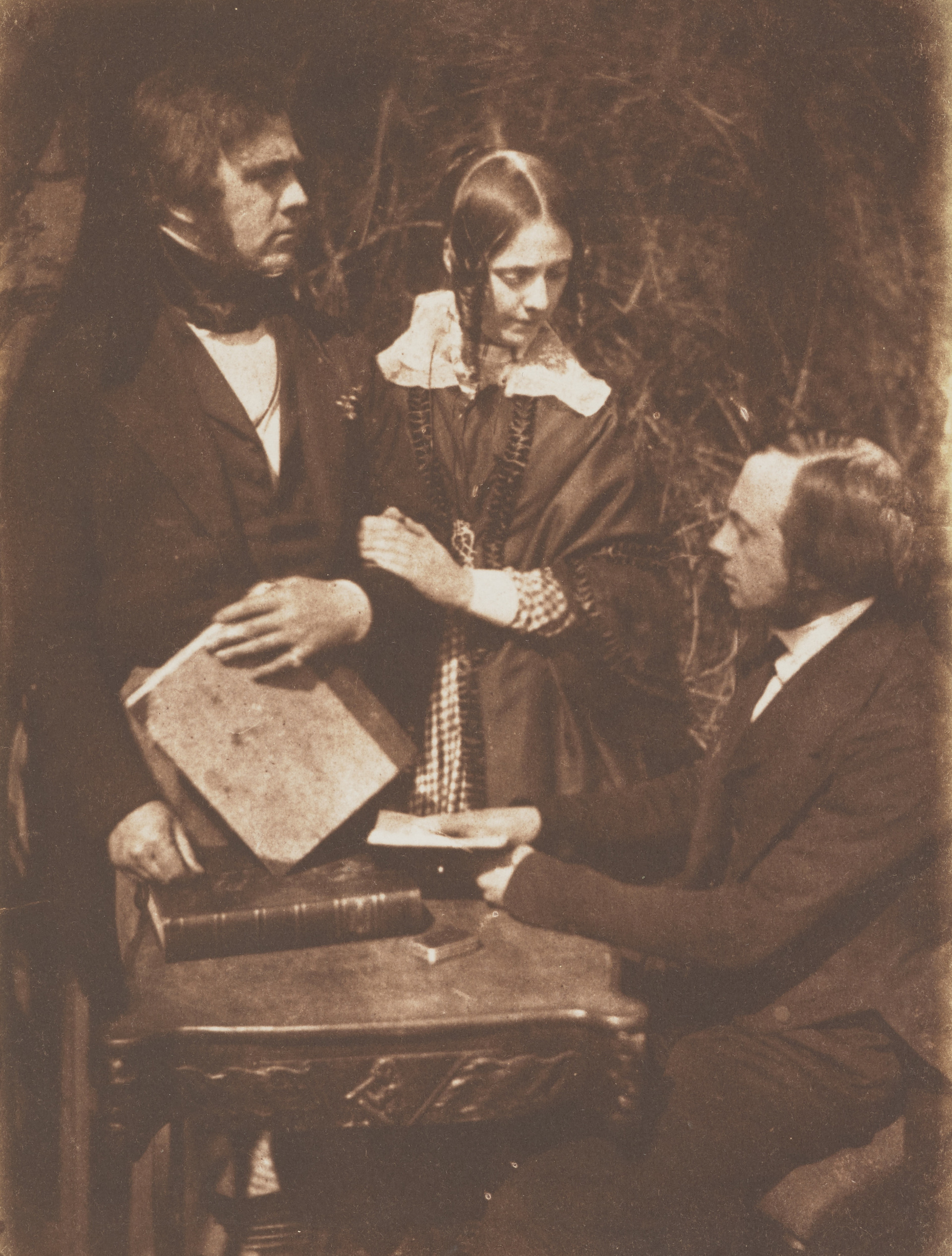
Dr George Bell, Alexina (Lady Moncrieff née Bell) and Rev Thomas Bell by Adamson and Hill

Moncreiff was twice married, first, on 8 February 1838, to Alexina-Mary, daughter of George Bell, a surgeon in Edinburgh; and secondly in 1875 to Lucretia (1827–1885), (whose brother was John Murray Graham), daughter of Andrew Murray of Murrayshall in Perthshire. There was no children by either marriage.

== Works ==
- A Letter to Lord Melbourne on the Appointment of Ministers in the Church of Scotland (Edinburgh, 1840)
- Letter to the Session and Congregation of East Kilbride regarding the late Convocation of Ministers (Edinburgh, 1843)
- The Present Aspects of the Cardross Case [a speech] (Edinburgh, 1861)
- Speech on the Union Question (Edinburgh, 1866)
- A Vindication of the Free Church Claim of Right (Edinburgh, 1877)
- The Free Church principle: its character and history; the first series of the Chalmers lectures by Sir Henry Wellwood Moncreiff, Bart... with biographical sketch of the author, by his brother the Right Hon. Lord Moncreiff of Tullibole
- Practice of the Free Church (London, 1871)
- Creeds and Churches in Scotland (Edinburgh, 1869)
- History of the Case of Professor William Robertson Smith (Edinburgh, 1879)
- Christian Union and Visible Characters (Edinburgh, 1860)
- "In-dependence of the Church" (Communication on the Principles of the Church, iii.)
- Account of the Parish of East Kilbride (New Statistical Account, vi.)

Baronetage of Nova Scotia
Preceded by James Wellwood Moncreiff	Baronet (of Moncreiff); 1851–1883	Succeeded by James Moncreiff
