= James Moncreiff, 1st Baron Moncreiff =

Scottish lawyer and politician

Member of Parliament
- In office 1851–1869

Personal details
- Born: 29 November 1811 Edinburgh, Scotland
- Died: 27 April 1895 (aged 83) Edinburgh, Scotland
- Resting place: Dean Cemetery
- Party: Liberal
- Children: 7, including Henry
- Education: Edinburgh High School
- Alma mater: University of Edinburgh

James Moncreiff, 1st Baron Moncreiff FRSE (29 November 1811 – 27 April 1895) was a Scottish lawyer and politician.

== Life ==
Moncreiff was born on 29 November 1811 to Ann, daughter of George Robertson, R. N. and Sir James Wellwood Moncreiff, 9th Baronet, a Scottish judge. He was born at his parents' Edinburgh townhouse on 13 Northumberland Street.

He was educated at Edinburgh High School then studied law at the University of Edinburgh and was admitted to the Faculty of Advocates in 1833. He was appointed Solicitor General for Scotland in 1850, and Lord Advocate from 1851 to 1852, from 1852 to 1858, from 1859 to 1866 and from 1868 to 1869. He was Dean of the Faculty of Advocates from 1858 to 1869. He was appointed Lord Justice Clerk from 1869 to 1888.

Moncreiff was appointed a Privy Counsellor in 1869. He was Rector of the University of Glasgow from 1868 to 1871, and held the degrees of LLD from both Edinburgh and Glasgow universities.

Moncreiff was Member of Parliament for Leith Burghs from 1851 to 1859, for Edinburgh from 1859 to 1868 and for Glasgow and Aberdeen Universities in 1868. During a long career in parliament Moncreiff guided the passing of over 100 acts of parliament, and his name is associated with the reform of legal procedure and mercantile law. As lord advocate he was engaged as public prosecutor in important cases, notably the trials of Madeline Smith, Wielobycki, and the directors of the Western bank.

In 1854, Moncreiff was appointed to the Royal Commission for Consolidating the Statute Law, a royal commission to consolidate existing statutes and enactments of English law.

In 1856, he defended the Scotsman in the libel action raised by Duncan McLaren, one of the members for the city of Edinburgh.

In January 1857, Moncreiff was presented with the freedom of his native city for the part he took in regard to the Municipal Extension Act. In 1859 he was appointed Lieutenant-Colonel Commandant of the newly formed 1st Queen's Edinburgh Rifle Volunteer Brigade (No 1 Company of which was recruited from Edinburgh advocates) – the first rifle volunteer corps in Scotland. He held the appointment until 1873 when he was appointed Honorary Colonel. In 1860, he helped pass the annuity tax bill, a subject in which, as a free churchman, he took close interest, and in the following year he carried the major bill relating to burgh and parochial schools. In 1861 he was engaged as leading counsel in the defence of Sir William Johnston, one of the directors of the Edinburgh and Glasgow bank, and in 1863-4 he was counsel in the famous Yelverton case.

For 19 years Lord Moncreiff occupied the judicial bench, presiding over the trials in the justiciary court of Chantrelle (1878), the City of Glasgow Bank directors (1878), the dynamitards (1883), and the crofters (1886).

Extrajudicially Moncreiff was occupied in many other matters. As a lecturer he was in great request, and delivered numerous orations in Edinburgh and Glasgow on subjects of literary, scientific, and political interest to the Philosophical Institution, Royal Society, Juridical Society, Scots Law Society, and other bodies. Moncreiff also published anonymously in 1871 a novel entitled A Visit to my Discontented Cousin, which was reprinted, with additions, from Fraser's Magazine. He was also a frequent contributor to the Edinburgh Review.

In 1858 Moncreiff received the honorary degree of LL.D. from the University of Edinburgh. From 1868 to 1871 he was rector of the University of Glasgow from which he received a second honorary doctorate of LL.D. in 1879, and in 1869 he was appointed a member of the Privy Council. On 23 May 1871 he was created a baronet of Kilduff in the County of Kinross in the Baronetage of the United Kingdom. On 9 January 1874 he was created Baron Moncreiff, of Tulliebole in the County of Kinross in the Peerage of the United Kingdom; in 1878 he was appointed a royal commissioner under the Endowed Institutions (Scotland) Act, and in 1883 he succeeded his brother as 11th baronet of Moncreiff.

In 1870 he was elected a Fellow of the Royal Society of Edinburgh his proposer was Charles Neaves. He was President of the Society 1879 to 1884.

In 1875, he became the inaugural President of the conservationist group the Cockburn Association, a position he held until 1893.

In September 1888, Moncreiff resigned the position of Lord Justice Clerk, and took up the preparation of his Memorials. On these he was engaged till his death on 27 April 1895. He is buried with his wife in Dean Cemetery in west Edinburgh.

== Artistic recognition ==
A full length portrait by Sir George Reid hangs in Old Parliament Hall next to the Supreme Court of Scotland.

== Family ==
On 12 September 1834 Moncreiff married Isabella Bell (d.1881), only daughter of Robert Bell FRSE (1781–1861), procurator of the Church of Scotland, and Sheriff of Berwickshire and Haddingtonshire. They lived at 47 Moray Place in the west end of Edinburgh.

They had two daughters and five sons. Their eldest son Henry Moncreiff, 2nd Baron Moncreiff sat from 1888 under the title of Lord Wellwood, as a Lord of Session.

== In popular culture ==
Moncreiff was portrayed by Walter Carr in the Granada Television series Lady Killers, in an episode depicting the trial of Madeleine Smith.

Parliament of the United Kingdom
Preceded by Andrew Rutherfurd	Member of Parliament for Leith Burghs; 1851–1859	Succeeded by William Miller
Preceded by Charles Cowan; Adam Black	Member of Parliament for Edinburgh; 1859–1868; With: Adam Black 1859–65; Duncan McLaren 1865–68	Succeeded by Duncan McLaren; John Miller
New constituency	Member of Parliament for Glasgow & Aberdeen Universities; 1868–1869	Succeeded by Edward Strathearn Gordon
Legal offices
Preceded by Thomas Maitland	Solicitor General for Scotland; 1850–1851	Succeeded by John Cowan
Preceded by Andrew Rutherfurd	Lord Advocate; 1851–1852	Succeeded by Adam Anderson
Preceded by John Inglis	Lord Advocate; 1852–1858	Succeeded by John Inglis
Preceded by David Mure	Lord Advocate; 1859–1866	Succeeded by George Patton
Preceded by Edward Strathearn Gordon	Lord Advocate; 1868–1869	Succeeded by George Young
Preceded by Lord Glenalmond	Lord Justice Clerk; 1869–1888	Succeeded by Lord Kingsburgh
Academic offices
Preceded by Thomas Carlyle	Rector of the University of Edinburgh; 1868–1871	Succeeded by William Stirling-Maxwell
Peerage of the United Kingdom
New creation	Baron Moncreiff; 1873–1895	Succeeded by Henry Moncreiff
Baronetage of Nova Scotia
Preceded by Henry Wellwood-Moncreiff	Baronet (of Moncreiff); 1883–1895	Succeeded by Henry Moncreiff
Baronetage of the United Kingdom
New creation	Baronet (of Kilduff); 1871–1895	Succeeded by Henry Moncreiff
