= Crook of Devon =

Village in Perth and Kinross, Scotland

Coordinates: 56.184°N 3.557°W

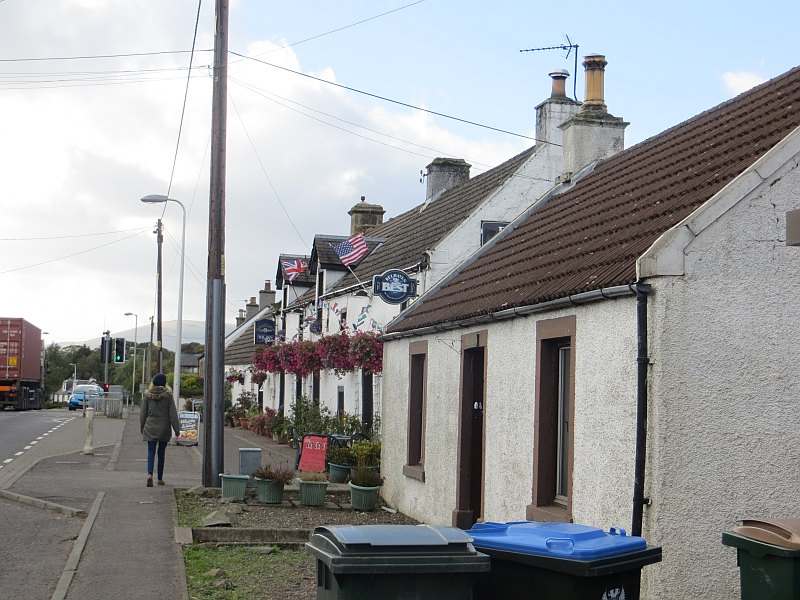
- The Inn, Crook of Devon

- Location within Perth and Kinross
- Population: 760 (2020)
- Council area: Perth and Kinross
- Lieutenancy area: Kinross-shire
- Country: Scotland
- Sovereign state: United Kingdom
- Post town: KINROSS
- Postcode district: KY13
- Dialling code: 01577
- Police: Scotland
- Fire: Scottish
- Ambulance: Scottish

Crook of Devon is a village within the parish of Fossoway in Kinross-shire about six miles (ten kilometres) west of Kinross in Scotland.

== Witchcraft executions ==
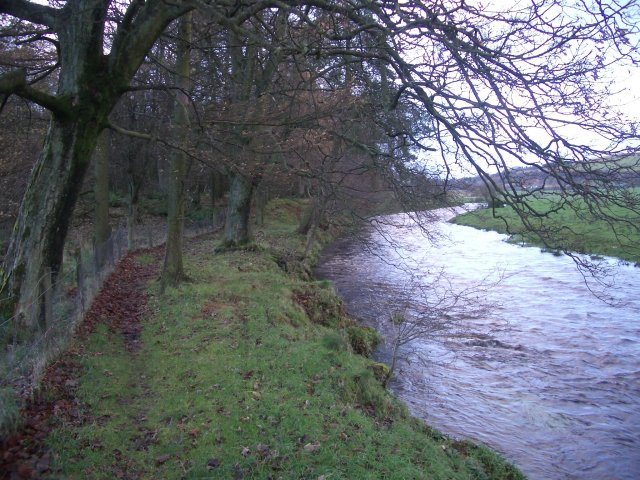
The River Devon approaching Crook of Devon

.

In the 17th century the town executed people after witch trials. 13 people were accused of witchcraft in four trials between the 3rd of April and 8th of October 1662.

Out of the 13 accused, 11 were convicted as witches based on their confessions during the trials: all admitted to forming a witches cell together, and confessed to accusations of spellcraft and communing with the devil.

All but two were sentenced to death by strangulation and their bodies burned at the stake. This occurred in the northwest corner of a field called Lamblaires, found in the Crook of Devon village down the road at the right hand side of the institute (Village Hall).

Of the two not convicted, Margaret Hoggin died before her sentencing at age 80, and Agnes Pittendreich, who was pregnant, was spared.

The "Witches' Maze" at Tullibole Castle was opened in 2012 in memorial of witches executed in the Crook of Devon area.

== Notable residents ==
- James Haig Ferguson (1862–1934) surgeon, born in the manse in Fossoway.
