= Sir James Wellwood Moncreiff, 9th Baronet =

Scottish lawyer and judge

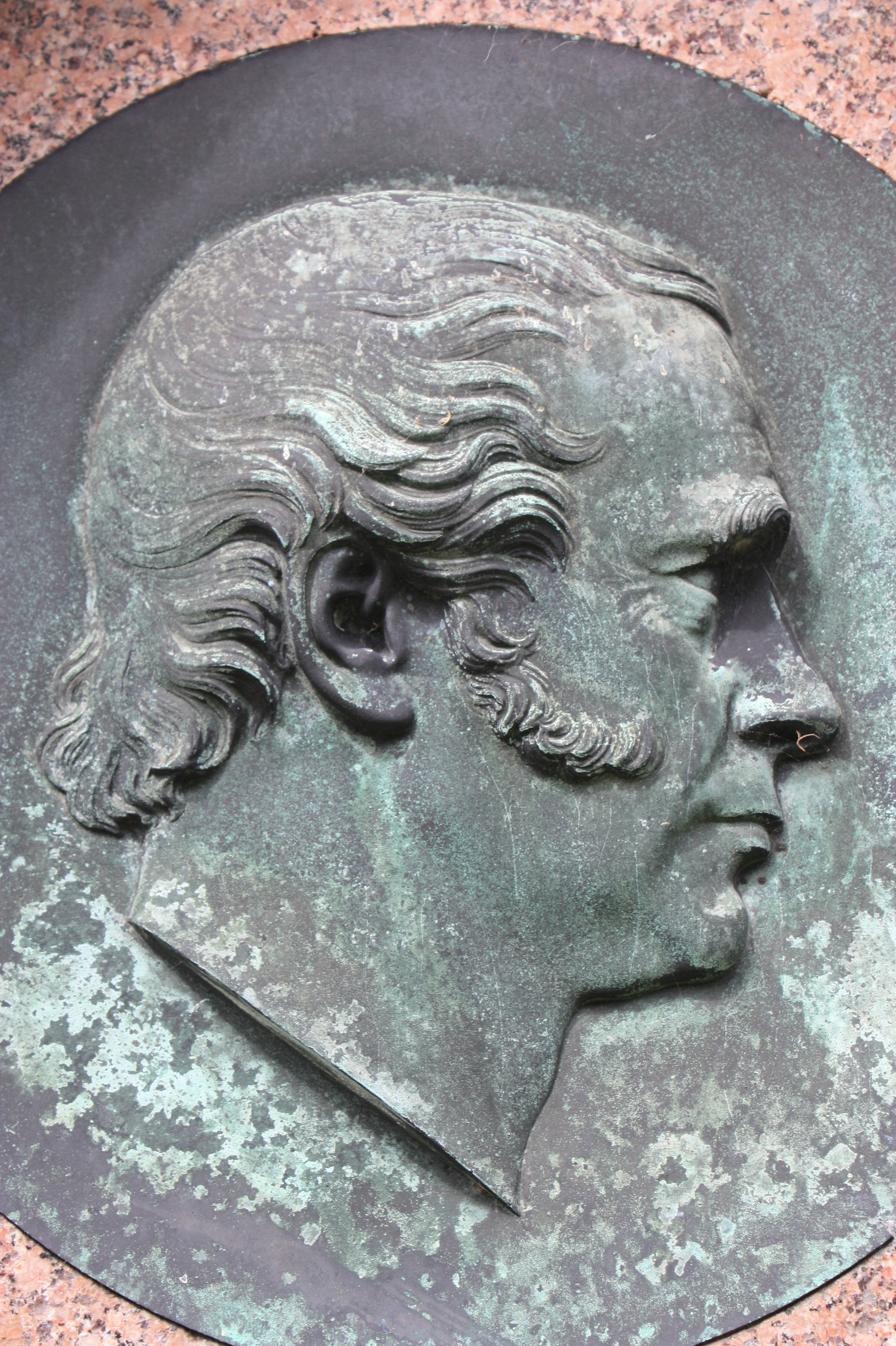
James Wellwood Moncrieff

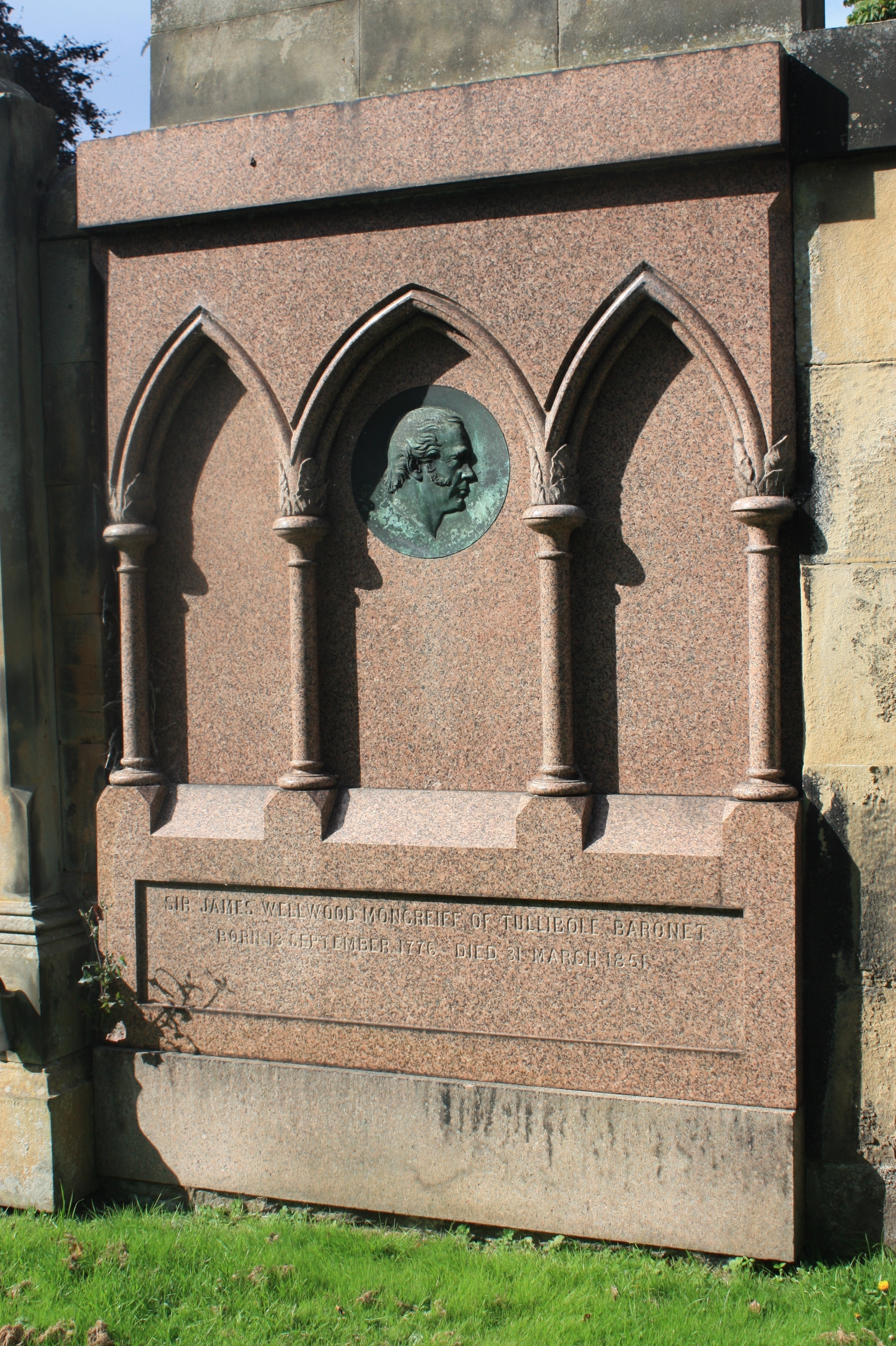
James Wellwood Moncrieff's grave, Dean Cemetery, Edinburgh

Sir James Wellwood Moncreiff, 9th Baronet, with the judicial title Lord Moncreiff (1776–1851) was a Scottish lawyer and judge.

== Life ==
He was born the second son of the Rev. Sir Henry Moncreiff Wellwood (1750–1827) of Tullibole in Kinross-shire, baronet and minister of St Cuthbert's Church, Edinburgh. Born 13 September 1776, he was educated at school in Edinburgh and at Glasgow University, and held an exhibition at Balliol College, Oxford, where he graduated B.C.L. in 1800. He was called to the Scottish bar on 26 January 1799.

A supporter of Henry Erskine while still young, Moncrieff retained his Whig principles. In the General Assembly of the Church of Scotland he was one of the lay leaders of the opposition to private patronage. In 1806 he stood for the office of procurator or legal adviser of the church, but was defeated by Sir John Connell. On 7 February 1807 he was appointed sheriff of Clackmannan and Kinross, and also acquired a good practice at the bar.

On 19 December 1820 Moncrieff presided at the Pantheon meeting, which passed resolutions in favour of a petition to the Crown for the dismissal of the Tory ministry of Lord Liverpool. On 22 November 1826 he was elected Dean of the Faculty of Advocates, his friend Francis Jeffrey making way for him, though his senior, gracefully ceding his claim in favour of his friend. In 1828, following the custom of the bar that no criminal should be undefended, he acted for the "resurrectionist" William Burke. In March 1829 he spoke at a large meeting in Edinburgh in favour of Catholic Emancipation.

On 24 June 1829 Moncrieff was made a judge of the court of session by Sir Robert Peel, in succession to Lord Alloway, and was succeeded as Dean of Faculty by Jeffrey. After becoming a judge he still acted as a member of the General Assembly, and carried in 1834 a motion in favour of a popular veto on patronage.

At the Disruption of 1843 Moncrieff joined the Free Church of Scotland.

He died on 30 March 1851. He is buried in Dean Cemetery in Edinburgh, against the north wall of the original cemetery, backing onto the late Victorian extension.

== Family ==
By his marriage in 1808 with Ann, daughter of Captain J. Robertson, R.N., he had five sons and three daughters. His eldest son was the Rev. Sir Henry Wellwood-Moncreiff, 10th Baronet, James Moncreiff, 1st Baron Moncreiff was his second son, and Thomas Moncreiff was his fifth son.

Baronetage of Nova Scotia
Preceded by Henry Moncreiff-Wellwood	Baronet (of Moncreiff); 1827–1851	Succeeded by Henry Wellwood-Moncreiff
