= Tullibole Castle =

17th-century castle in Crook of Devon, Perthshire, Scotland

- Interactive map of the Tullibole Castle area

General information
- Location: Perth and Kinross, Crook of Devon, Scotland
- Coordinates: 56°11′18″N 3°31′41″W
- Completed: 1608

Design and construction
- Architect: John Halliday

Tullibole Castle is a 17th-century castle in Crook of Devon, a village in Perth and Kinross. It was built by John Halliday in 1608 and is currently owned by the Moncreiff family. The castle was designated a Category A listed building in 1971.

== History ==
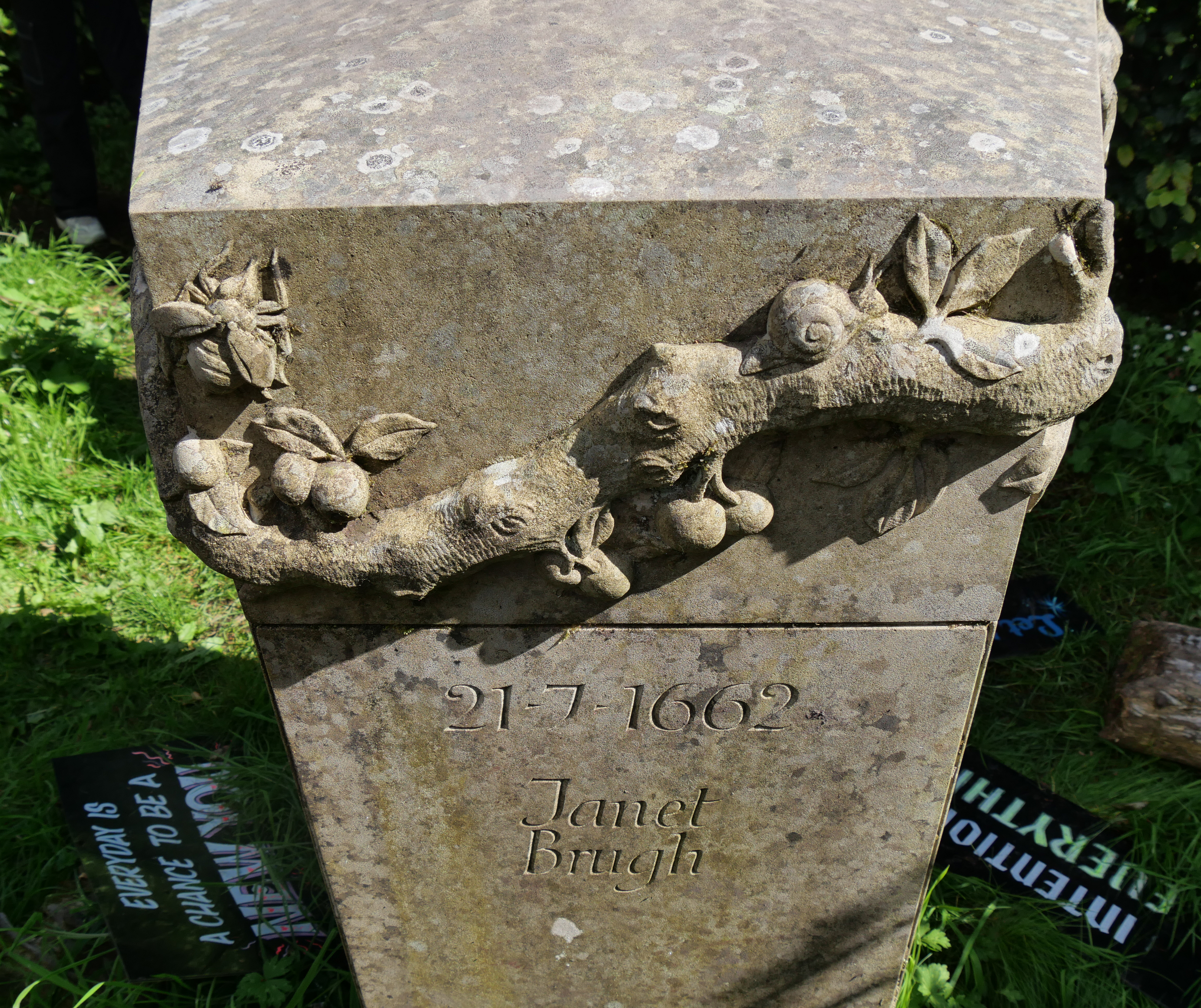
Memorial to the Tullibole Witches

The first evidence of a building on the site was in 1304. The current castle began as a 16th-century tower house before it was expanded in 1608 by John Halliday who bought the land in 1589 from the Herring family. The castle was extended again later in the 18th century before it was passed by marriage to the Moncreiff family in around 1740. The interior of the castle and the gardens were renovated in the late 1950s. The name of the castle changed from Tulliebole Castle to Tullibole Castle during the same period.

In 2012, a memorial was unveiled at the castle, commissioned by the current owner of the castle, Rhoderick Moncreiff. It commemorates the Crook of Devon witch trials in 1662 where previous members of the Moncreiff family sent 11 people to their deaths because they were believed to be witches.

The castle is now primarily used for weddings and events as well as a bed and breakfast.
