= Harry Sheppard =

Harry or Harold Sheppard may refer to:

- Harry R. Sheppard (1885–1969), U.S. Representative from California
- Harry Sheppard (musician) (1928–2022), jazz vibraphonist
- Harold Sheppard (English cricketer) (1888–1978), English cricketer
- Harold Sheppard (Scottish cricketer) (1917–1997), Scottish cricketer and solicitor

== See also ==
- Harry Shepherd (1903–1988), speedway rider
- Harry Shepherd (baseball) (fl. 1930s), American baseball player
- Harry Shepherd (photographer) (born 1854), African-American photographer
- Henry Sheppard (born 1952), baseball player
- Henry Fleetwood Sheppard (1824–1901), English clergyman
- Henry Shepherd (1857–1947), Dean of Antigua
