= Edinburgh Mathematical Notes =

Mathematics journal published by the Edinburgh Mathematical Society

Edinburgh Mathematical Notes was a mathematics journal published from 1909 until 1961 by the Edinburgh Mathematical Society.

The journal was originally named Mathematical Notes, with the subtitle A Review of Elementary Mathematics and Science. Its creation was the suggestion of George Alexander Gibson, a professor at University of Glasgow, who wished to remove the more elementary or pedagogical articles from the Proceedings of the Edinburgh Mathematical Society. Is founding editor was Peter Pinkerton, who at the time headed the mathematics department of George Watson's College and later became rector of the High School of Glasgow.

21 issues of the journal were published from 1909 to 1916. During World War I, the journal went on hiatus, resumed publishing for two issues in 1924 and 1925, and then it went on hiatus again until 1929. In 1939, it changed its name from Mathematical Notes to Edinburgh Mathematical Notes. In 1958 its issues began being published as issues of the Proceedings of the Edinburgh Mathematical Society, and after 1961 they became incorporated into a department of the Proceedings rather than being published separately. After 1967 it stopped appearing altogether.

The archives of the journal are available online to subscribers through the Cambridge University Press.
