= John MacQueen Ward =

Scottish businessman (born 1940)

Sir John Ward CBE FRSE FRSA FIET
- Born: John MacQueen Ward; 1 August 1940 (age 86); Edinburgh, Scotland
- Education: Fettes College; Edinburgh Academy
- Occupation: Businessman
- Years active: 1966–2012
- Children: 4
- Awards: CBE (1995); Knight Bachelor (2002); Royal Society Fellowship (2004)

Sir John MacQueen Ward CBE FRSE FRSA FIET (born 1 August 1940) is a Scottish businessman.

== Early life ==
The son of Marcus Waddie Ward and Catherine MacQueen, Ward was educated at Edinburgh Academy and Fettes College.

== Career ==
He began a career with IBM at its Greenock Manufacturing Plant in 1966, and in 1991 was appointed Managing Director of UK Government and Public Service Business having worked for the company throughout the world.

He subsequently held a wide range of business and public sector jobs, including Chairman of CBI Scotland, Chairman of Scottish Qualifications Authority, Chairman of Quality Scotland Foundation, Chairman of the Governing Body (Court) of Edinburgh’s Queen Margaret University, and Chairman of Scottish Homes.

Ward joined Macfarlane Group as a non-executive director in 1995 and took over the chairman's role when its eponymous founder retired in 1998.

His later appointments included the Chairmanship of Scottish Enterprise and of European Assets Trust NV. He was also a Trustee of the National Museums of Scotland between 2005 and 2012 and was Chairman of Dunfermline Building Society between 1995 and 2007.

== Awards ==
Ward was appointed a CBE in 1995, the same year he received an Honorary Degree from the University of Strathclyde. He received a Knighthood in the 2002 New Year Honours for Services to Public Life in Scotland.

Ward also received an Honorary Doctorate from Heriot-Watt University in 1998 and was elected Fellow of the Royal Society in 2004 for private sector leadership. He appeared at number 10 on The Scotsman's 100 Most Powerful list the same year.
