= David Kennedy Fraser =

Scottish psychologist

David Kennedy Fraser FRSE FEIS (10 February 1888 – 26 August 1962) was a Scottish psychologist, educator and amateur mathematician. He was an author of several books looking at the education of the handicapped and was closely associated with the Scottish Association for Mental Health. He campaigned vigorously for the rights of handicapped persons.

He was the grandson of the celebrated Scottish singer David Kennedy and was named in his honour.

== Life ==
Fraser was born on 10 February 1888 in Edinburgh the son of the celebrated singer Marjory Kennedy (1857-1930) and Alexander Yule Fraser FRSE (1850-1890), a maths teacher at George Watson's College. His father died when he was two years old. His mother raised Fraser at their home, 5 Mayfield Road in south Edinburgh, together with his grandmother, two aunts and his sister, Helen Patuffa, in an all-female environment.

Together with Andrew J G Barclay his father had founded the Edinburgh Mathematical Society and mathematics was inevitably a lifelong interest despite his father's early death.

Fraser attended George Watson's College from 1893 to 1904. He then took a general degree at the University of Edinburgh graduating with a BSc in 1908 and an MA in 1909. He undertook foreign studies first at Leipzig in Germany and Cornell University in the United States, studying there under G M Whipple. At Cornell he was appointed Assistant Professor in the Department of Education in 1914.

In 1919 he became a lecturer at the newly rebuilt Moray House School of Education in Edinburgh, also teaching at the University of Edinburgh. In 1923 he became a Psychologist for Glasgow Education Authority, working at Jordanhill Training College.

In 1929 he was elected a Fellow of the Royal Society of Edinburgh. His proposers were James Drever, George Carse, James Hartley Ashworth and Sir Edmund Taylor Whittaker.

He died after a short illness at his home in Milngavie, Glasgow on 26 August 1962. He left a wife and three daughters.

== Publications ==
- The Psychology of Education
- The Education of the Backward Child (1932)
