= Piano Quartet in C major =

Piano Quartet in C major may refer to:

- Piano Quartet No. 3 (Beethoven)
- Piano Quartet (Matthay)
