= Andrew Barclay (mathematician) =

Scottish mathematician

Andrew Jeffrey Gunion Barclay
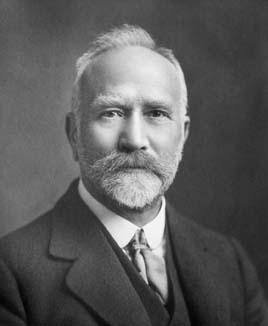
- Born: 19 April 1849; Hawick, Roxburghshire
- Died: 15 September 1943 (aged 94); London
- Resting place: Saint Andrews Churchyard in Aldringham; 52.186180°N 1.585055°E
- Education: University of Edinburgh
- Known for: Founder of Edinburgh Mathematical Society
- Spouse: Jane Pender
- Parent(s): George and Jane Barclay
- Scientific career
- Fields: Mathematics
- Workplaces: George Watson's College; High School of Glasgow

Andrew Jeffrey Gunion Barclay (19 April 1849 – 15 September 1943) was a Scottish mathematician, known for being one of the founders of the Edinburgh Mathematical Society.

== Life and work ==
Barclay studied at University of Edinburgh where he graduated in mathematics in 1880. Then he was professor of mathematics at George Watson's College (Edinburgh) and at High School of Glasgow. He retired in 1914 and went to reside in London with a son.

Barclay, with Alexander Yule Fraser and Cargill Gilston Knott, issued in January 1883 a circular calling for a Mathematical Society. That year the Edinburgh Mathematical Society was founded and Barclay became its president in 1884.

== Bibliography ==
- Despeaux, Sloan Evans (2011). "A voice for mathematics. Victorian mathematical journals and societies". In Raymond Flood; Adrian Rice; Robin Wilson (eds.). Mathematics in Victorian Britain. Oxford University Press. pp. 155–176. ISBN 978-0-19-960139-4.
- Rankin, R.A. (1983). "The first hundred years (1883–1983)". Proceedings of the Edinburgh Mathematical Society. 26 (2): 135–150. doi:10.1017/S0013091500016849. ISSN 0013-0915.
