= David Kennedy (singer) =

Scottish musician

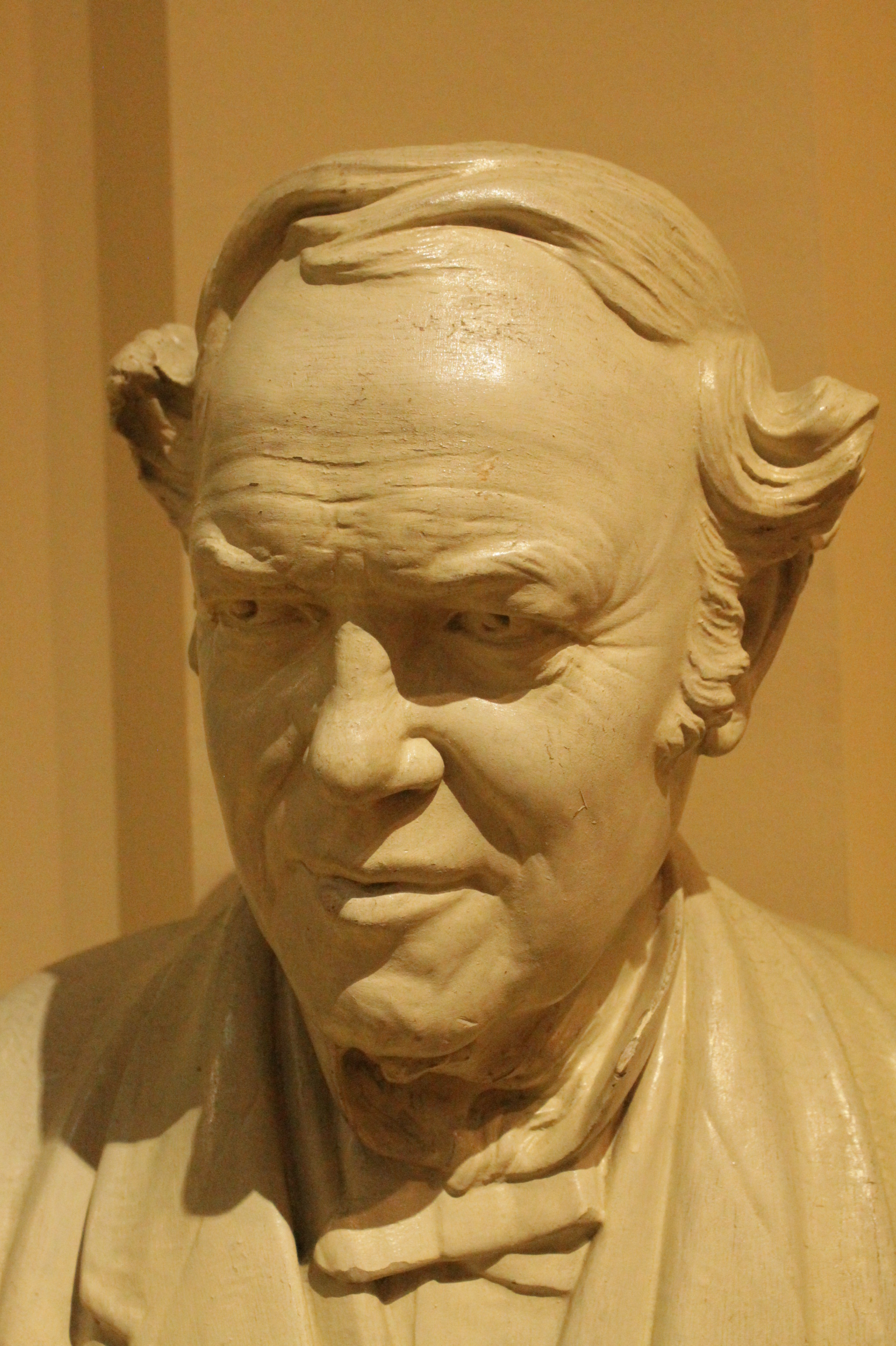
The singer David Kennedy by George Webster, 1885, Perth Museum

David Kennedy (1825–1886) was a Scottish church musician and concert giver.

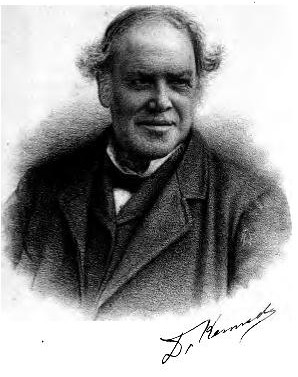
David Kennedy

== Life ==
Born in Perth on 15 April 1825, he was son of a weaver who was also precentor of the United Secession Church there. At 16 he was apprenticed to a painter, while also being trained by his father in music, and in 1845 became precentor of the South Kirk, Perth. During 1848 he worked at his trade in Edinburgh and London, and returned to Perth to set up in business.

Kennedy then obtained a precentorship in Edinburgh, and in 1859 began there a series of weekly concerts. Short concert tours in Scotland followed in 1860 and 1861, and in 1862 he made his first appearance in London, at the Hanover Square Rooms. Between December 1862 and May 1863 he gave a hundred concerts in the Egyptian Hall; and in 1864 and 1865 he was again in London, singing and reading parts of Waverley.

In 1866–8 Kennedy made a professional tour through Canada and the eastern sections of the United States, with his eldest daughter as his accompanist. In 1869 he went to San Francisco, by way of the Isthmus of Panama. The First transcontinental railroad was opened while Kennedy was at San Francisco, and he sang The Star-Spangled Banner at the inaugural ceremony. After spending three years at home, in 1872–6 he made a tour round the world with his family, visiting Australia and New Zealand, the United States, Canada, and Newfoundland. From 1876 to 1879 he was engaged in tours in England, Scotland, and Ireland, including two seasons in London; in 1879 he visited South Africa, and in 1879–80 India. On his way home he spent time in Italy, where some of his children were studying.

In 1881–2 Kennedy was again in Canada and the United States, in 1883–4 in Australia and New Zealand. In March 1886 he appeared in London for the last time, and then left for Canada.

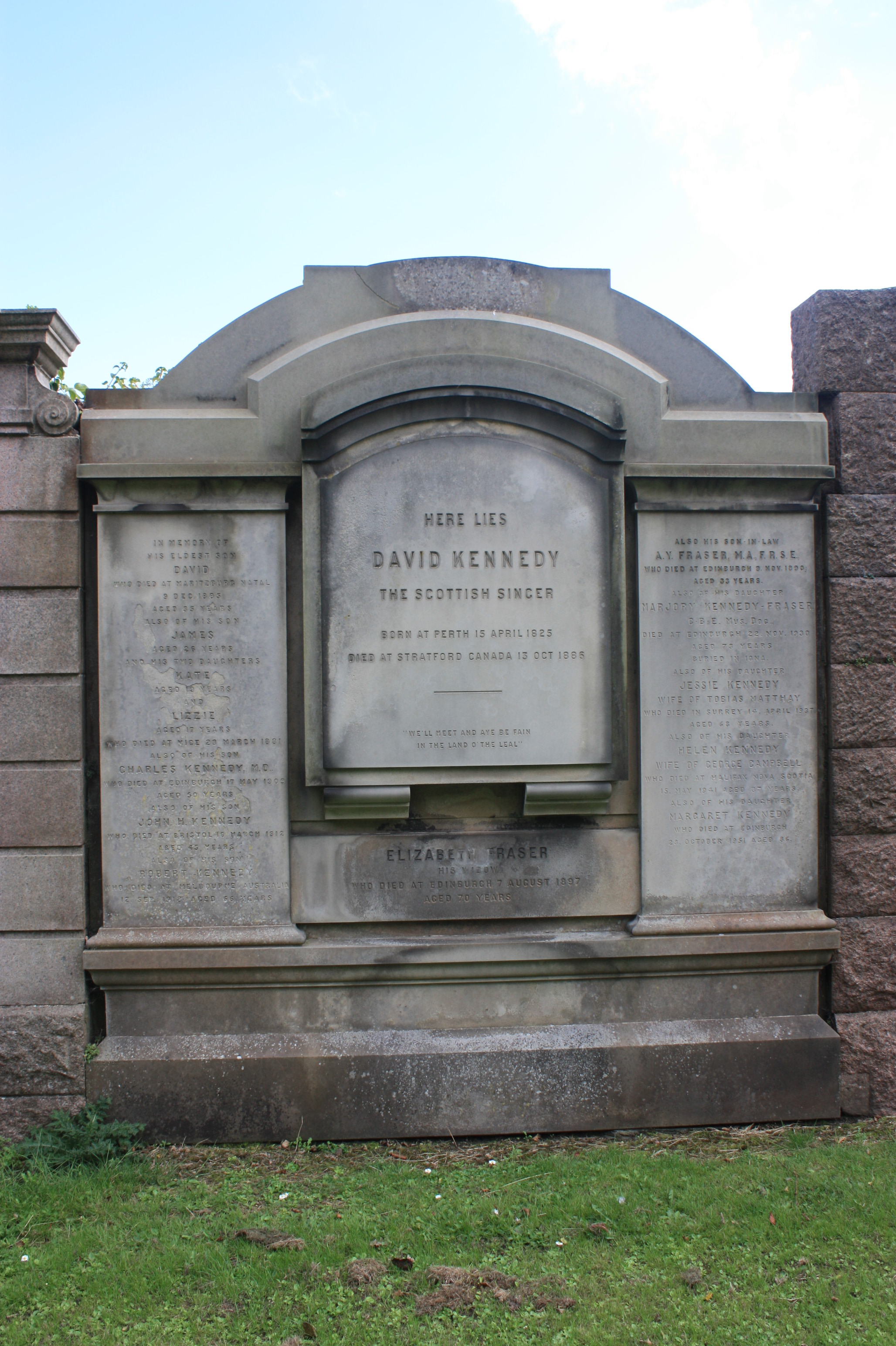
The Kennedy-Fraser grave, Grange Cemetery, Edinburgh

He died at Stratford, Ontario, 12 October 1886. His body was returned to Edinburgh for burial. He is buried with his wife and children against the southern wall of Grange Cemetery in Edinburgh.

Two of his children wrote a biography David Kennedy, the Scottish Singer (Alexander Gardner, 1887). In 1887 the Edinburgh Burns Club began to raise funds for a monument to three Scottish vocalists, John Templeton, John Wilson, and Kennedy. Portrait medallions were placed on Calton Hill.

== Family ==
With his second wife, Elizabeth Fraser, Kennedy had 11 children, including the singer and folk-song collector Marjory Kennedy-Fraser (who married the mathematician Alexander Yule Fraser).

David's youngest daughter, Jessie Henderson Kennedy (d. 1937), married the pianist and composer Tobias Matthay. In 1881 Kennedy's son James and daughters Kate and Lizzie (baritone, contralto and soprano respectively) died in the burning of the Théâtre municipal of Nice, France.

His grandson was the psychologist David Kennedy Fraser FRSE named in his honour.

== Notes ==
Attribution

This article incorporates text from a publication now in the public domain: Lee, Sidney, ed. (1892). "Kennedy, David". Dictionary of National Biography. Vol. 30. London: Smith, Elder & Co.
