= Eleanor Franklin Pike =

Eleanor Baxter Franklin Pike (1890 - c. 1973) was a British composer, choral conductor, music educator and pianist. She composed many pedagogical works for piano, as well as songs and chamber music through at least opus 45. Widely published during her lifetime under the name Eleanor Franklin Pike, her works remain popular and in print today.

Pike was born in London. She studied at the Tobias Matthay Pianoforte School, the Royal Academy of Music (London), and Trinity College, where she earned a Licentiate of the Royal Academy of Music (LRAM), Associate of the Royal College of Music, (ARCM), Licentiate of Trinity College London (LTCL) and Music, Drama, and Speech Teaching (MRST) certifications.

In 1918, Pike donated the proceeds from her students’ concert to provide additional musical facilities for British soldiers through the YMCA.

Pike is best known today for her multi-volume “Easiest Tune Book” series for piano students, in which she arranged simplified versions of well-known melodies such as Christmas carols, hymns, marches, national airs and Negro spirituals. Her works were initially published by Augener & Co. and Edward Ashdown Ltd., and include:

== Chamber ==
- Idylle (violin and piano)
- Reverie (violin, cello and piano)
- Sea Song (violin and piano)

== Piano ==
- Bells of Aberdovey (arrangement; for six hands)
- Easiest Tune Book series
- Keel Row, op. 8 no. 1 (for six hands)
- Little Dance Suite for Piano, op. 45
- Princess Dances (for six hands)
- Slow March and Quick March (for six hands)
