= Fergus W. Campbell =

Scottish vision scientist

- Born: Fergus William Campbell; 30 January 1924; Glasgow, Scotland
- Died: 3 May 1993 (aged 69); Cambridge, England
- Education: University of Glasgow
- Known for: Visual system
- Spouse: Helen (m. 1947)
- Awards: 14th Foundation lecturer The British Optical Association (1959); Honorary Fellow of The British Optical Association (1962); Fellow of the Royal Society (1978); Tillyer Medal from the Optical Society of America (1980); Honorary Doctor of Science from University of Glasgow (1986); Honorary Doctor of Science from Aston University (1987)
- Scientific career
- Fields: Vision science
- Workplaces: University of Cambridge; Oxford University
- Doctoral students: Roger Carpenter

Fergus William Campbell (30 January 1924 – 3 May 1993) was a Scottish vision scientist who conducted foundational research into the optics of the human eye, into the electrical activity of the brains of people experiencing various phenomena of vision, and into the sorts of images which, when shown to people, might reveal the processes of their visual systems. Campbell's research changed the course of vision science.

== Life and education ==
Campbell was born on 30 January 1924 in Glasgow, Scotland. His father, William Campbell (1891–1968), was a pharmacist and doctor; his mother, Anne Fleming (1898–1984) was her future husband's counter assistant before taking care of their four children. Campbell was his parents' second child and their first boy. His parents provided an intellectually nurturing home full of books. Campbell received his education at Glasgow High School for Boys. As a child, Campbell was a keen reader and, encouraged by his teachers and father, had hobbies in chemistry, physics, optics, photography, electricity, and radio.

Campbell studied medicine at Glasgow University Medical School, graduating in 1946. After graduating, Campbell prepared to become an ophthalmologist, passing the Diploma of Ophthalmic Medicine and Surgery from the Royal College of Surgeons in 1948. But Campbell became more interested in research than in clinical practice, completing a PhD (on corneal wound healing) from Glasgow University in 1952, then an MD (on the depth of focus of the eye) in 1959.

Although Campbell's research work took him to Oxford University and then University of Cambridge, both in England, he remained true to his Scottish heritage and his humble origins. He was much beloved by colleagues and students, renowned for his kindliness, generosity, and stock of good stories.

While doing his medical studies at University of Glasgow, Campbell met his wife-to-be, Helen, who became a doctor. They married in 1947 and had four children, one of whom died at 17 in a riding accident. Campbell was afflicted lifelong by ankylosing spondylitis, and by bouts of iritis. He died on 3 May 1993.

== Career ==
While studying for his PhD and MD, Campbell worked as an ophthalmologist from around 1948 to 1951. He then spent a year at Nuffield Laboratory in Oxford working with T.C.D. Whiteside on aviation medicine.

In 1953, Campbell was appointed as a lecturer at the Cambridge Physiological Laboratory. He spent the remainder of his career there, eventually winning a personal chair in Neurosensory Physiology before retiring in 1991. He was a fellow at St. John's College.

== Community service ==
Between 1960 and 1962, Campbell served on the General Optical Council of the UK National Health Service, representing educational interests for optometry.

Campbell was an Advisory Editor of Spatial Vision, and a member of the editorial board of Ophthalmic and Physiological Optics.

== Selected works ==
- Campbell, F. W.; Robson, J. G. (1968). "Application of Fourier analysis to the visibility of gratings". The Journal of Physiology. 197 (3): 551–566. doi:10.1113/JPHYSIOL.1968.SP008574. PMC 1351748. PMID 5666169.

== Honours ==
In 1959, Campbell became the 14th Foundation lecturer of the British Optical Association. In 1962, he was awarded an honorary Fellowship of The British Optical Association. In 1978, Campbell was elected as a Fellow of the Royal Society. He won the Tillyer Medal from the Optical Society of America in 1980, and was awarded an honorary Doctor of Science from University of Glasgow in 1986 and from Aston University in 1987.
