= Ian McDonald (civil servant) =

British civil servant and government spokesman (1936–2019)

Chief Public Relations Officer (MoD)
- Prime Minister: Margaret Thatcher
- Succeeded by: Neville Taylor

Personal details
- Born: 29 March 1936 Langside, Glasgow, Scotland, UK
- Died: 28 March 2019 (aged 82)
- Education: High School of Glasgow; University of Glasgow; Royal College of Defence Studies
- Occupation: Civil servant

Ian McDonald (29 March 1936 – 28 March 2019) was a civil servant in the UK's Ministry of Defence and was the Ministry's spokesman during the Falklands War.

== Life and career ==
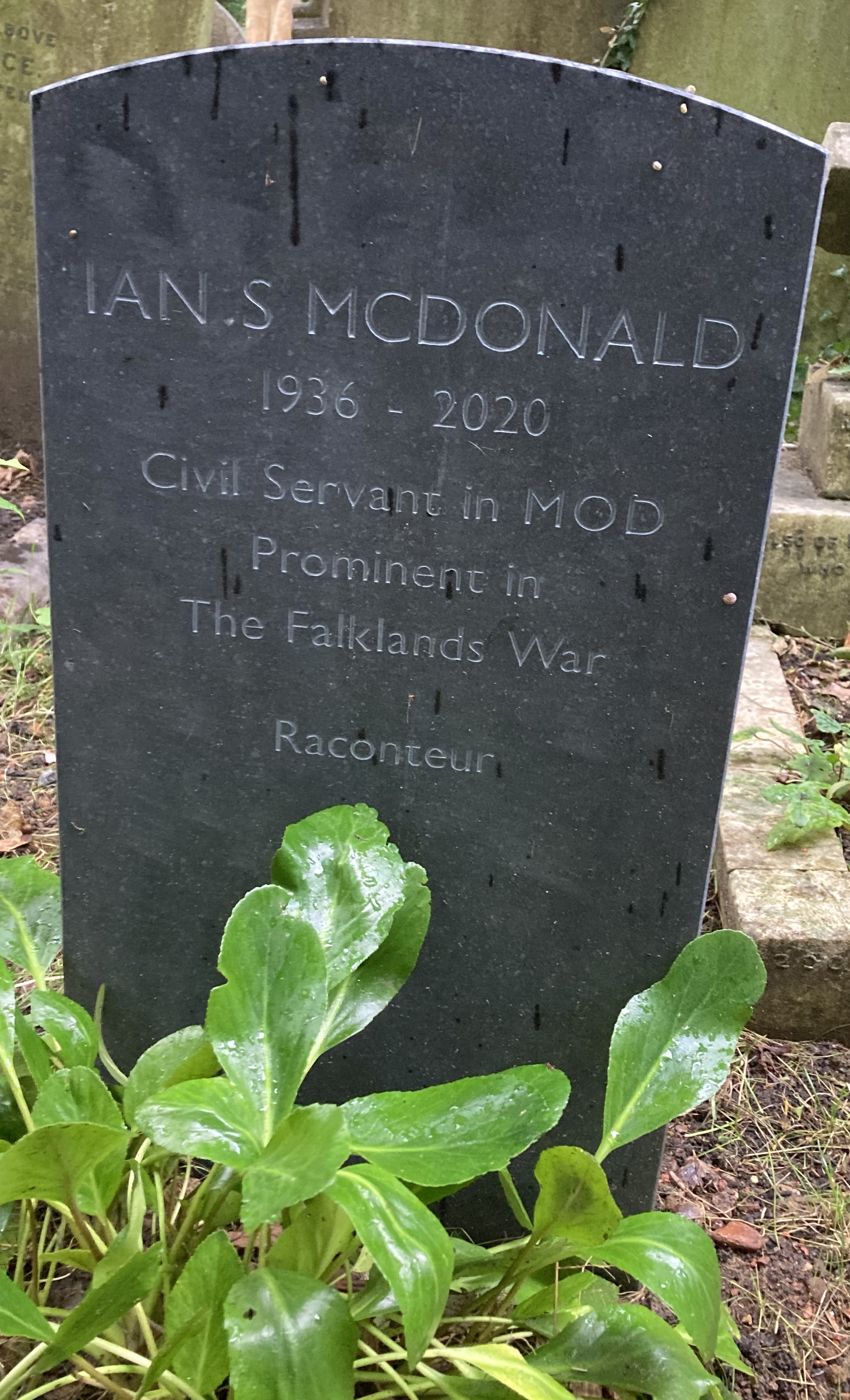
Grave of Ian McDonald in Highgate Cemetery

McDonald was born on 29 March 1936, in Langside, Glasgow. With his brother, he attended Glasgow High School. He went on to study law at University of Glasgow and began postgraduate studies in Greek and Italian at the same university. Soon thereafter McDonald was conscripted into the army as a translator in Cyprus, however he had studied ancient Greek rather than the modern Greek which was required for his posting. McDonald was discharged from the army and joined a law firm in Glasgow. He later moved to Karachi, Pakistan, to work as a teacher for a year.

Upon his return to the UK, McDonald was appointed to a junior position in the Ministry of Defence. He was promoted through the ranks until spring 1982, during the Falklands War, when he came into prominence as the spokesman for the ministry. Speaking at dictation speed in a monotone voice that British viewers found authentic and reassuring, McDonald gave regular briefings on the events of the war using a teacher's pointer and maps of the islands.

As the British forces recaptured the islands, "McDonald became renowned for his restrained, and at times emotionless, style of delivery." However, he frustrated reporters with his mysterious answers to questions, often quoting William Shakespeare in lieu of a response. In one instance he said "Hamlet, Act One, Scene Two, Line 215" which reads "But answer made it none". On Channel 4's documentary When Britain Went To War (2002), McDonald revealed that he became the subject of amorous attention from TV viewers, including a woman who stalked him for two years and sent him emotive letters.

In 1986, McDonald was made head of the Defence Exports Services Secretariat. He was in charge of the department during the Arms-to-Iraq affair and his name was included in the 1996 Scott Report, in which Richard Scott criticised McDonald for his "inattention … consistent with his general approach to line management".

McDonald, who never married nor had children, spent his later years at a villa in Umbria, Italy.

He died of pneumonia on 28 March 2019, the day before he would have turned 83 years old.

His ashes are buried on the eastern side of Highgate Cemetery. The headstone incorrectly states the year of his death as 2020.
