= Eunice Norton =

American pianist (1908 - 2005)

Eunice Norton (June 30, 1908 – December 9, 2005) was an American pianist.

== Life and career ==
Mrs. Norton was born in Minneapolis, Minnesota. She studied as a child at the University of Minnesota with William Lindsay, who later introduced her to Dame Myra Hess. Hess was so impressed with the 15-year-old Norton's playing that she arranged for Norton to study in England in 1923 with Hess's own mentor, the famed pedagogue Tobias Matthay, with whom Norton would remain in association for 8 years.

Mrs. Norton made her first appearance within that same year with the Queen’s Hall Symphony Orchestra under the baton of Sir Henry Wood, who subsequently took Norton on tour as soloist throughout the provinces. She played many recitals at that time in Wigmore Hall, and was soloist with the Manchester, Birmingham, and B.B.C. Symphonies under Sir Hamilton Harty and Sir Adrian Boult.

After winning the Chappell Gold Medal and the London Bach Prize in 1927, she performed in Vienna, The Hague, Paris, and Leipzig with the famous Leipzig Gewandhaus Orchestra. In Berlin alone, she gave more than twenty concerts to dazzling critical reviews, including a Bach concert about which musicologist and critic Alfred Einstein wrote, "Her Bach is played as Bach would have wished to hear it." In Amsterdam, Paderewski said after hearing her Chopin, "You will play in all the great halls of the world."

As if fulfilling this prediction, Norton soon played in Moscow, St. Petersburg, and Budapest. In the United States, she made her formal debut at Carnegie Hall and later premiered many new works at frequent concert appearances at Town Hall. She was invited by Koussevitzsky to play with the Boston Symphony Orchestra, and was heard from coast to coast as recitalist and soloist with the New York Philharmonic, Philadelphia, Minneapolis, Pittsburgh, and Chicago symphonies under Dobrowen, Verbrugghen, Stokowski, Ormandy, Stock, Reiner, and Steinberg. One highlight from this period was her premiere performance and recording with RCA Victor of Hindemith's Kammermusik No. 2, with Stokowski conducting.

An important milestone occurred in Mrs. Norton's development when she heard Artur Schnabel's performances of Beethoven's piano sonatas in 1932. She spent three successive seasons under his tutelage in Berlin and Italy, and later enjoyed many rewarding years of friendship and association with him.

Yet, possibly the most important factor in Mrs. Norton's evolution as an artist occurred during the years which she spent away from the concert stage developing her playing through more secluded work.

In 1934, Mrs. Norton married chemist Bernard Lewis and settled in Pittsburgh in 1942 to raise a family when he was hired by the U.S. Bureau of Mines. She continued to perform, soloing with the PSO under music director William Steinberg in 1954 and giving numerous local recitals. With her husband she founded Pittsburgh’s chapter of the New Friends of Music, which still exists today as the Pittsburgh Chamber Music Society, the city’s premiere chamber music series. She was an honorary member of the Tuesday Music Club. She later founded the Peacham Music Festival in Vermont, where many live recordings of her maturing performances were produced.

Mrs. Norton performed with the American Chamber Orchestra, the Juilliard, Budapest, Griller, and Curtis String Quartets, at the White House for President Hoover, a Schnabel memorial concert at Lincoln Center, an all Beethoven recital at Rockefeller University, and the first radio broadcast of Bach's Goldberg Variations in the USA.

She is well known for her master classes at her studios in Pennsylvania, Vermont, and at numerous universities throughout the United States, and taught at the University of Pittsburgh, the Catholic University of America, the University of Minnesota, and was Visiting Professor of Piano at Carnegie-Mellon University. Her series of four lectures on the teaching of Artur Schnabel was documented at the University of Pittsburgh in 1987, and her lecture on Matthay’s teaching was filmed in November 1995 at Carnegie-Mellon University.

She died in Vienna, Austria at 97.
