= The Seal Woman =

The Seal Woman is a 1924 "Celtic Folk Opera" by Granville Bantock to a libretto by Marjory Kennedy-Fraser and drawing upon some of the melodies in Kennedy-Fraser's collection of Hebridean folk songs.

The opera premiered at the Birmingham Repertory Company, 27 September 1924, conducted by Bantock, and produced by Barry Jackson. Kennedy-Fraser herself took the part of the old crone.

== Recording ==
The Seal-Woman Orchestra of Scottish Opera, conducted by John Andrews. Retrospect Opera.
