= Hilda Dederich =

English pianist and composer

Hilda Dederich (1901–1969) was an English pianist, composer and piano teacher. She was a child prodigy and was the youngest of the pupils of Tobias Matthay. She was taught by Hedwig McEwen at the Tobias Matthay Pianoforte School on Wimpole Street in Marylebone. After her marriage in 1922 to Herman Lindars, she continued to use her maiden name.

Dederich stayed at Matthay's country house during the Second World War and subsequently taught and became a director of the school. Dederich was a teacher at the Royal Academy of Music.

Dederich toured with the Beecham Symphony Orchestra under Thomas Beecham while a teenager. Dederich performed at the National Gallery in London in the 1940s, appearing in a performance of Johann Sebastian Bach's The Art of the Fugue in 1943. In the 1920s Dederich appeared as 'Aunt Hilda' on the BBC radio programme Children's Hour to talk to children about the basics of piano music.

In her obituary in The Times, Ivor Newton wrote that Dederich "never knew her once show any concern for her own aggrandisement" and that "among artists such qualities of modesty and altruism are sadly rare". Her name is recorded in the Book of Remembrance at the Musicians' Chapel at St Sepulchre-without-Newgate church in the City of London.

Her composition "Moonlight Through the Cedar Tree" was recorded by David Reeves and released on his 2000 album Piano Music of the Unknown Impressionists on Fleur de Son.
