= Marjory Kennedy-Fraser =

Scottish singer

Marjory Kennedy-Fraser CBE
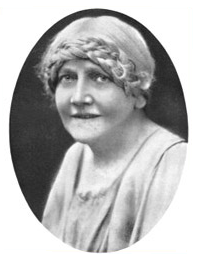
- Marjory Kennedy-Fraser in her 40s
- Born: Marjory Kennedy; 1 October 1857; Perth, Scotland
- Died: 22 November 1930 (aged 73); Edinburgh, Scotland
- Occupations: Pianist, singer, composer, music teacher
- Spouse: Alexander Yule Fraser
- Children: David and Helen Patuffa

Marjory Kennedy-Fraser CBE (1 October 1857 – 22 November 1930) was a Scottish singer, composer and music teacher and supporter of women's suffrage and pacifism. According to Ray Perman, Kennedy-Fraser "made a career of collecting Gaelic songs in the Hebrides and singing her own Anglicized versions of them."

== Biography ==
Marjory Kennedy was born in Perth to a well-known Scottish singer, David Kennedy and his second wife, Elizabeth Fraser. As a child she used to accompany her father on his tours in Scotland and abroad, playing the piano while he sang. Various of her siblings were also professional musicians, and three of them —Lizzie (soprano), Kate (contralto) and James (baritone) — died in the fire that burnt down the Théâtre municipal of Nice, France, in 1881. Her youngest sister Jessie married the pianist and teacher Tobias Matthay. Their father David Kennedy died aged 61 in 1886 in Ontario, Canada, while on a tour.

She became an extra-academical student at the University of Edinburgh school of Music, gathering a collection of Breton and Gaelic folksongs from 1882 onwards, which were later published.

In 1887, she married her mother's younger cousin, the mathematician Alexander Yule Fraser FRSE (1857–1890), who she had first met in 1882 in Aberdeen. Alexander (Alec) had completed in 1881 his MA with Honours at the University of Aberdeen and in 1885 was made a Fellow of the Royal Society of Edinburgh. In 1889, he was appointed headmaster of Allan Glen's Technical School in Glasgow, and the family moved there. However, his health began to deteriorate and he was diagnosed with pneumonia.

The couple travelled to South Africa, where the hotter weather allowed for Alec's health to improve considerably, but as soon as they returned to Glasgow, he became ill again and died in November 1890. Marjory thus found herself a widow at the age of thirty-three, and with her two small children, David and Helen Patuffa (often referred to as Patuffa), to look after. She settled at 5 Mayfield Road in southern Edinburgh with her mother and two sisters and made her living as a music teacher and lecturer.

In the 1890s, Kennedy-Fraser gave lecture recitals at the Summer Meetings which Patrick Geddes organised at University Hall Extension in Edinburgh. In 1911 she is listed as a piano teacher at 95a George Street in the centre of Edinburgh.

She developed a close friendship with the painter John Duncan, with whom she shared a deep passion for the Celtic Revival. They made a trip to Eriskay in 1905, on which occasion he painted her against the island's landscape. While on Eriskay, Kennedy-Fraser heard many Gaelic folk songs that were in danger of disappearing due to population decline, and, with the assistance of Eriskay's parish priest, the iconic Gaelic poet Fr Allan MacDonald, she began a personal project to record and transcribe the music of the Hebrides.

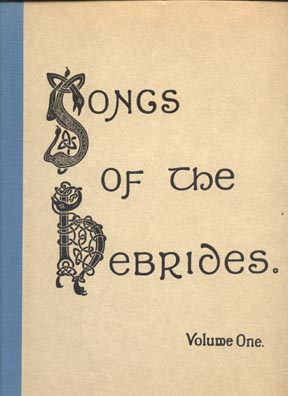

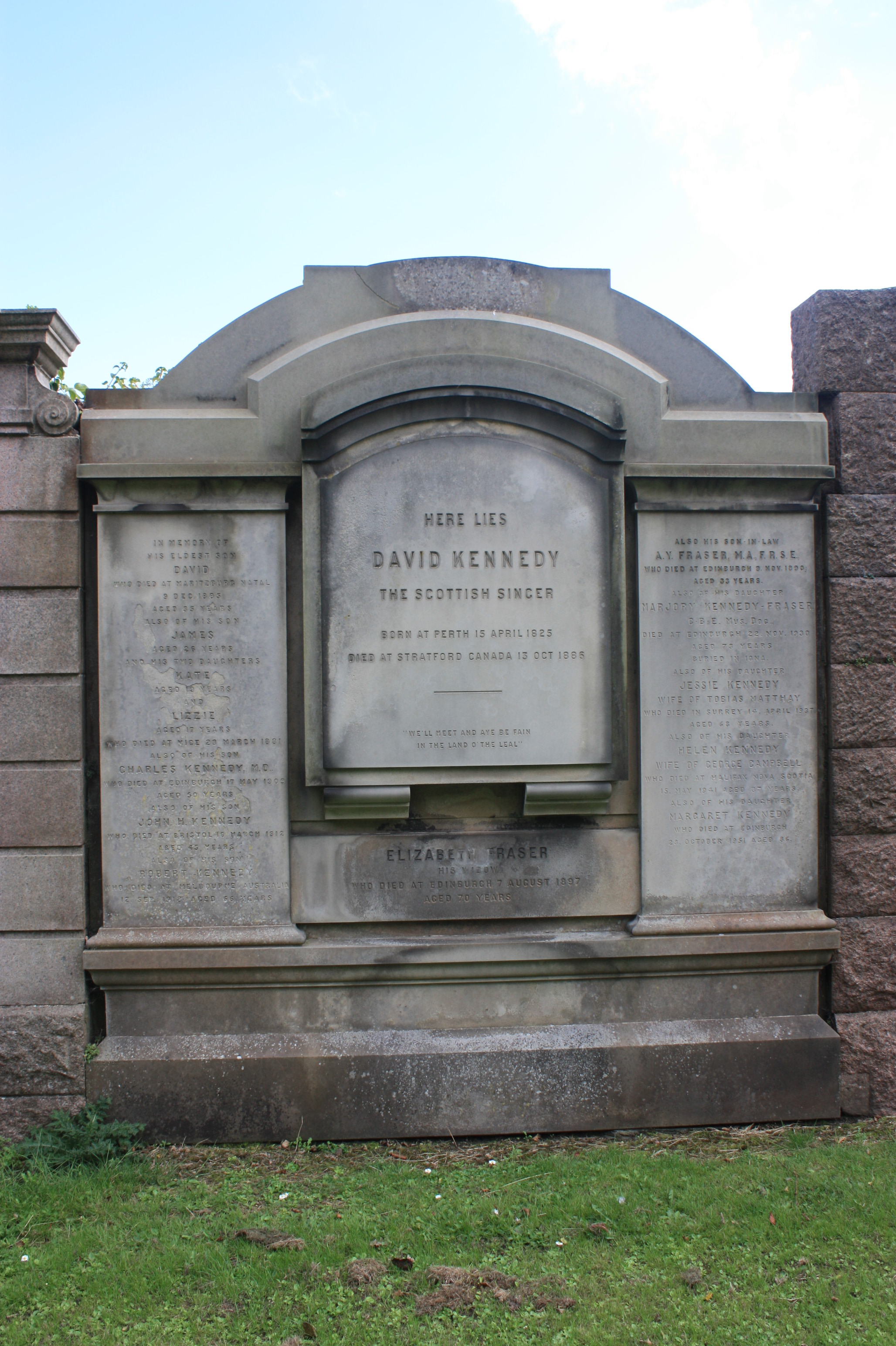
The Kennedy-Fraser grave, Grange Cemetery, Edinburgh

In the following years, she visited many of the islands to the west of Scotland, recording the traditional songs with a wax cylinder phonograph. She later arranged them as art songs for voice and piano, or sometimes for harp or clàrsach - an instrument her daughter Helen Patuffa played. The arrangements, with words translated to English by the Rev. Kenneth MacLeod, were published in her three-volume Songs of the Hebrides in the years 1909, 1917 and 1921. A fourth volume, From the Hebrides: Further Gleanings of Tale and Song, followed in 1925. Two of the songs included in this collection eventually came to be widely known: Tàladh Chrìosda, which she renamed "The Christ Child's Lullaby", and the "Eriskay Love Lilt".

The Rev. Kenneth MacLeod with whom she often collaborated was a famous poet in both Gaelic and English and the long time Church of Scotland minister of Gigha. He is perhaps best known for "The Road to the Isles" and "Thou Isle of Mull" and was related to such other literary figures as the journalist James Cameron and the writer Dr. John Cameron of St. Andrews.

For her contributions, Kennedy-Fraser was awarded with a CBE, together with an honorary degree of Doctor of Music from the University of Edinburgh, awarded in 1928.

In 1930 she presented her archive of songs to the University Library, including her original wax cylinders of recordings. Marjory Kennedy-Fraser died in Edinburgh in the same year.

In order to preserve the original wax cylinder recordings, they were re-recorded on tape several decades later for the Sound Archives of the School of Scottish Studies. More recently, they have been digitized and are held in the collections at the University of Edinburgh, with her archived papers, including papers related to her libretto for Granvile Bantock’s 1924 Celtic folk opera The Seal Woman and proofs of 'Life of Song' (which became her autobiography, 1929).

Although her parents and husband are buried in the Grange Cemetery in south Edinburgh, the substantial gravestone lying against the southern boundary wall, her own grave is in the island of Iona.

=== Recitals ===
Marjory Kennedy-Fraser and her daughter Patuffa used to present the collected songs in recitals. Below is a description of one such recital given at the Aeolian Hall, New York City, on 17 March 1916.

Mrs. Marjory Kennedy-Fraser and her daughter, Patuffa Kennedy-Fraser, appeared for the first time here at Aeolian Hall last night in a recital of folk songs of the Hebrides. They have come into the possession of this material by collecting it at first hand during trips made for the purpose to the group of islands off the Scottish coast which are known as the Hebrides. The unaffectedness and evident sincerity of the artists is one of the chief charms of their work. Each plays piano accompaniments for the other, and the daughter used for several of the songs the small Celtic harp, which is played in a half kneeling position. The music itself is most interesting. The subjects range from poetic rhapsodies founded on the natural features of the islands or its life to the homelier songs that are sung as an accompaniment to various forms of manual labor. They are prefaced generally with a short talk explaining their origin and the manner in which they were heard and written down.

— The New York Times

American ethnomusicologist Margaret Fay Shaw attended a similar recital while attending St Bride's boarding school for girls at Helensburgh, near Glasgow. She later wrote about this life-altering concert, "As a child, I had learned Scots songs and a few of Robert Burns', but these she sang were completely new. To think they had been found in the Hebrides and I had never known anything about them! But there was something wrong, I felt; there was something more to these songs. If I could only go to those far-off islands and hear those singers myself!"

The Russian tenor, Vladimir Rosing, frequently performed Kennedy-Fraser's songs in his recitals in England and North America. In a 1919 concert review, Ezra Pound, reporting as William Atheling in the New Age, declared that Rosing was "the first singer who has been adequate to the music."

=== Politics ===
Kennedy Fraser supported women's suffrage and Scottish independence, and used her knowledge of Scots and Gaelic song traditions to give examples which reinforced her views.

In 1909 she chaired a large meeting of the Women's Freedom League, at the Oddfellows Hall, which had overflow meetings to meet demand. She first introduced the keynote speaker, Mrs Ethel Snowden (wife of Labour politician Phillip Snowden, and national activist of NUWSS). Kennedy Fraser explained briefly that 'it is not the outcome of the noisy clamour of un-womanly women but is on the contrary a symptom of the gradual awakening of women to their social responsibilities' that was encouraging support for women's enfranchisement, and referred to the 'seed sown' by women 'such as Josephine Butler', and a growing recognition that without the vote, women's aims for improving society will be limited. Mrs Snowden then also countered the argument that (some) women did not actually want the vote by saying at least 1.5 million women did and at least 6 million people were for equal suffrage of both men and women. Kennedy Fraser's meeting also voted for Mrs Snowden's motion for a change in law.

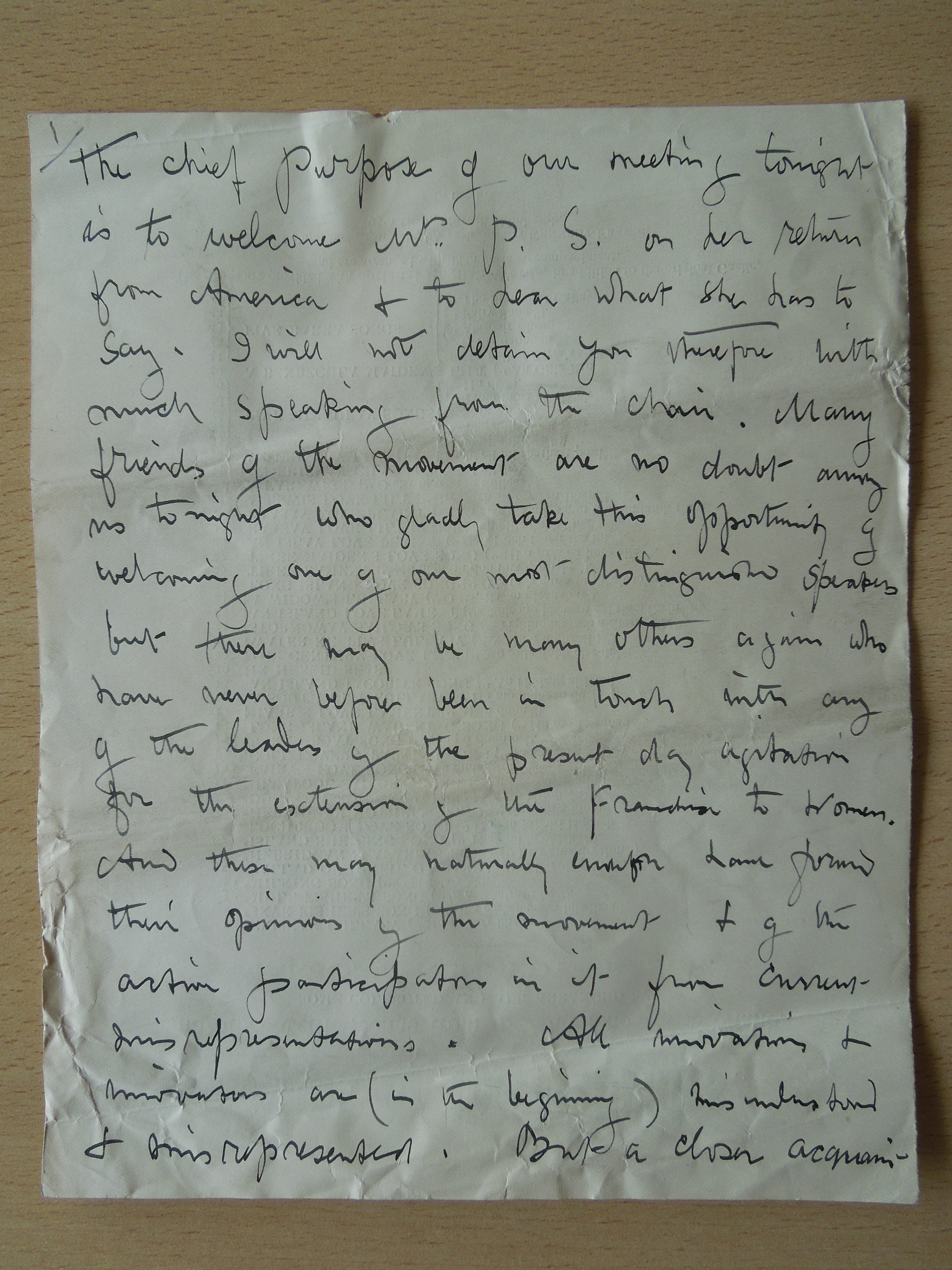
Marjory Kennedy Fraser WFL meeting notes 16 February 1909 p.1

Kennedy Fraser was also involved with Frances Tolmie in the Labour movement. Recent studies indicate that she was one of the women members of the Edinburgh Parish Council, through engagement with the Edinburgh Women's Citizen Association.

Kennedy-Fraser had formally applied during World War One to travel to The Hague in April 1915, as one of 180 women activists and pacifists, including Sylvia Pankhurst, to represent their country as part of the Women's International Congress, demanding peaceful resolution to disputes and women's formal engagement in international affairs. Her permission to travel, as with most of the group, was denied for military reasons, and only 3 British delegates were among the Women at the Hague.

She later became one of the founders of the Bangour Village Hospital, West Lothian, which provided care and new ways of treating World War I combat veterans with 'shell-shock'.

Kennedy-Fraser was appointed a Companion of the Order of the British Empire (CBE) in the 1924 Birthday Honours.

== Death and legacy ==
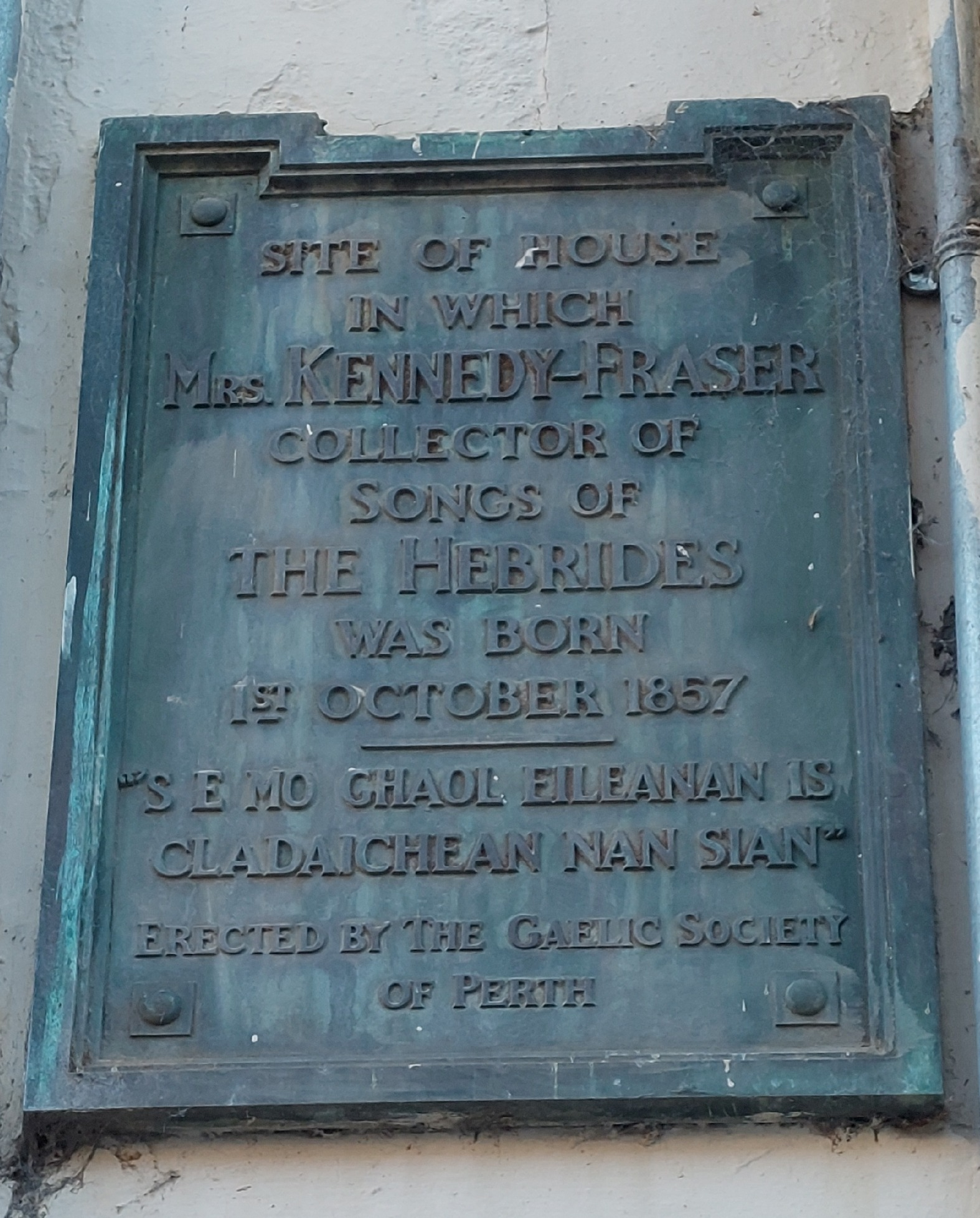
Plaque on the site where Marjory Kennedy-Fraser was born on 1 October 1857, 60-62 High Street, Perth

Kennedy-Fraser died on 22 November 1930. She is honoured in Perth with a plaque at 60-62 High Street, site of the house she was born in. It remembers her as a "collector of songs of the Hebrides" and contains a quote in Scots Gaelic "s'e mo Ghaoil eileanan is cladaichean nan sian". It was erected by the Gaelic Society of Perth.

== See also ==
- John Lorne Campbell
- https://commons.wikimedia.org/wiki/Category:Marjory_Kennedy-Fraser for Kennedy-Fraser's WFL notes pp1–4
