= Macfarlane Group =

Macfarlane Group PLC
- Traded as: LSE: MACF
- Industry: Packaging
- Founded: 1949
- Founder: Lord Macfarlane of Bearsden
- Headquarters: Glasgow, Scotland
- Key people: Aleen Gulvanessian (Chair); Peter Atkinson, (CEO)
- Revenue: ▲£300.8 million (2025)
- Operating income: ▼£12.5 million (2025)
- Net income: ▼£6.3 million (2025)
- Number of employees: 1,100 (2026)
- Website: www.macfarlanegroup.com

Macfarlane Group PLC is a packaging company headquartered in Glasgow, Scotland. It is listed on the London Stock Exchange.

== History ==
The company was founded by Lord Macfarlane of Bearsden as a commercial stationery company in Bath Street, Glasgow in 1949.

The company expanded and was floated on the London Stock Exchange in 1973 and then entered the packaging distribution market by acquiring Abbots Packaging in 1980.

After a period of growth in the 90s, the business expanded its share of the packaging distribution market by acquiring National Packaging in 2001, Network Packaging in 2014 and Nelsons for Cartons Packaging in 2016. This was followed by Greenwoods Stock Boxes in 2017, as well as Tyler Packaging (Leicester) Ltd and Harrison's Packaging Ltd in 2018.

The company went on to buy GWP Group, a packaging business based in Wiltshire, in 2021 and sold its labels division to Reflex in 2022.

The company then bought Suttons, a packaging business based in Cambridgeshire, in 2023. Later in 2023, the company bought Barum & Dewar, a company operating in Hampshire and Devon. In 2024, it bought Polyformes, a business based in Bedfordshire and, in 2025, it bought Pitreave Group, a business operating in Scotland.

== Divisions ==
Macfarlane Group has two core divisions: Packaging Distribution and Design & Manufacture. Key market sectors served by the Packaging Distribution Division include eCommerce, third party logistics, manufacturing, retail, industrial, automotive, electronics and aerospace. Key market sectors served by the Design & Manufacture Division include industrial, automotive, defence, aerospace, electronics and medical.
