= Walter Coulter =

Scottish footballer (1891–1917)

Personal information
- Full name: Walter McFarlane Coulter
- Date of birth: 1891
- Place of birth: Frederiksted, Danish West Indies
- Date of death: 20 May 1917 (aged 25–26)
- Place of death: Croisilles, France
- Position: Right half

Senior career*
Years	Team	Apps	(Gls)
1912–1915	Queen's Park	1	(0)
- * Club domestic league appearances and goals

Walter McFarlane Coulter MC (1891 – 20 May 1917) was a Scottish amateur footballer who played in the Scottish League for Queen's Park as a right half.

== Personal life ==
Coulter grew up the son of a sugarcane planter in the Danish West Indies and was sent to live in Scotland in 1894. He was educated at Thornliebank School, the High School of Glasgow and the Royal College of Science and Technology. After leaving school, Coulter served an engineering apprenticeship and prior to the First World War, he worked in the drawing office at Fairfield Shipyard. By spring 1915, half a year after the outbreak of the First World War, Coulter had enlisted in the Highland Light Infantry. He was commissioned as a temporary second lieutenant on 28 September 1915 and was awarded the Military Cross for actions on 7 February 1917:

For conspicuous gallantry and devotion to duty during a raid on the enemy's trenches. He led his men with great dash and the success of the raid was largely due to his personal coolness and initiative. He has on many previous occasions done fine work.

— The London Gazette, 23 March 1917

Captain Coulter was killed in an attack on Croisilles on 20 May 1917. He is commemorated on the Arras Memorial.

== Career statistics ==
Appearances and goals by club, season and competition
Club	Season	League			Scottish Cup		Total	
Club	Season	Division	Apps	Goals	Apps	Goals	Apps	Goals
Queen's Park	1913–14	Scottish First Division	1	0	0	0	1	0
Career total			1	0	0	0	1	0
