= Granville Bantock =

British composer and conductor (1868–1946)

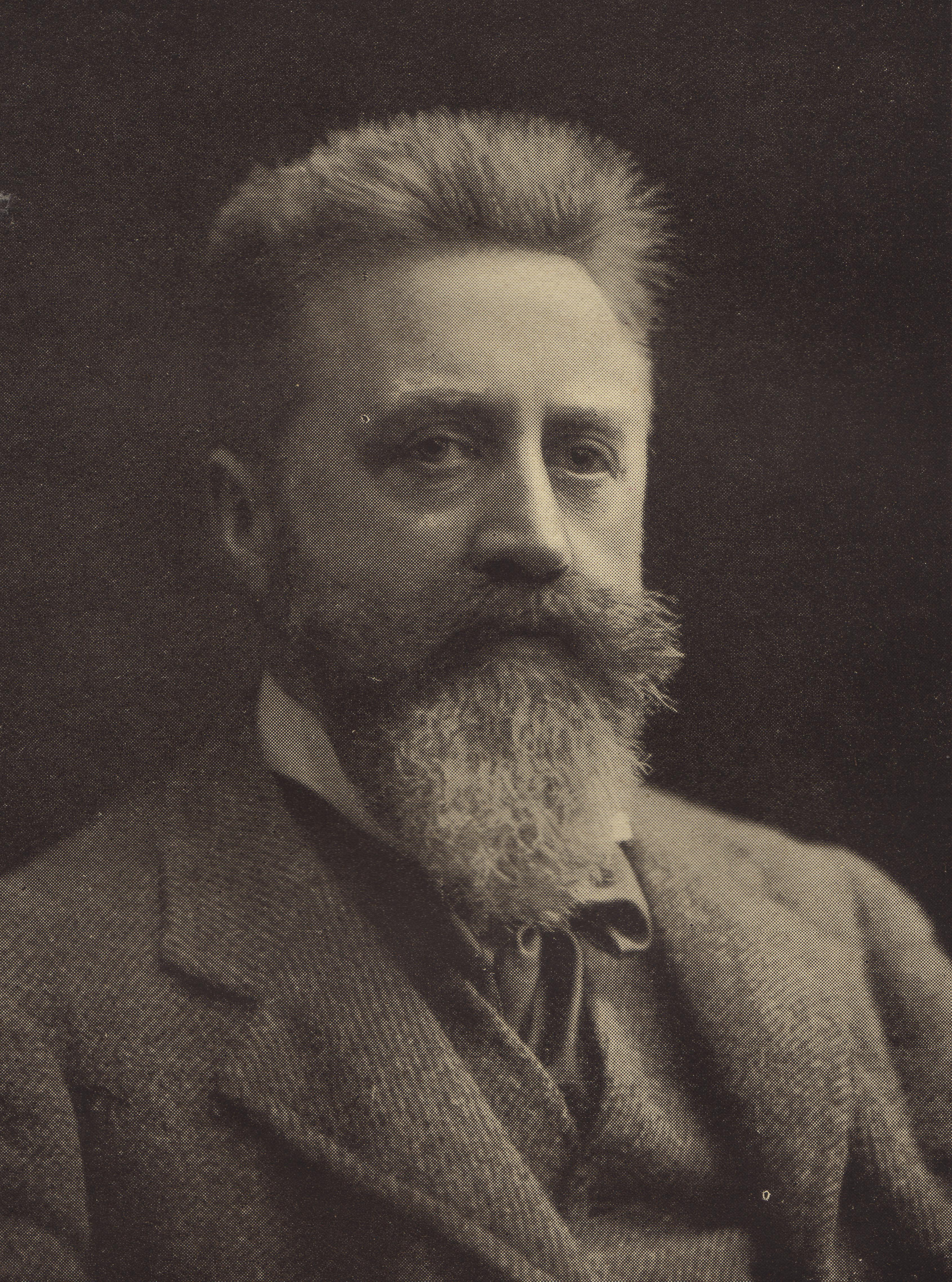
Granville Bantock (picture first published 1913)

Sir Granville Ransome Bantock (7 August 1868 – 16 October 1946) was a British composer of classical music.

== Biography ==
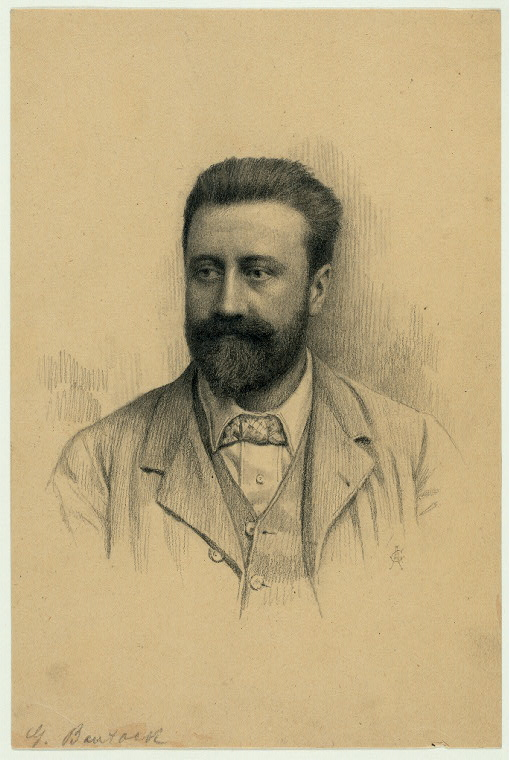
Sir Granville Bantock

Granville Ransome Bantock was born on 7 August 1868 in London. His father was an eminent Scottish surgeon. His younger brother was the dramatist and film director Leedham Bantock. Granville Bantock was intended by his parents for the Indian Civil Service but he suffered poor health and initially turned to chemical engineering. At the age of 20, when he began studying composers' manuscripts, at South Kensington Museum Library, he was drawn into the musical world.

His first teacher was Gordon Saunders at Trinity College of Music. In 1888, he entered the Royal Academy of Music where he studied harmony and composition with Frederick Corder winning the Macfarren Prize in the first year it was awarded.

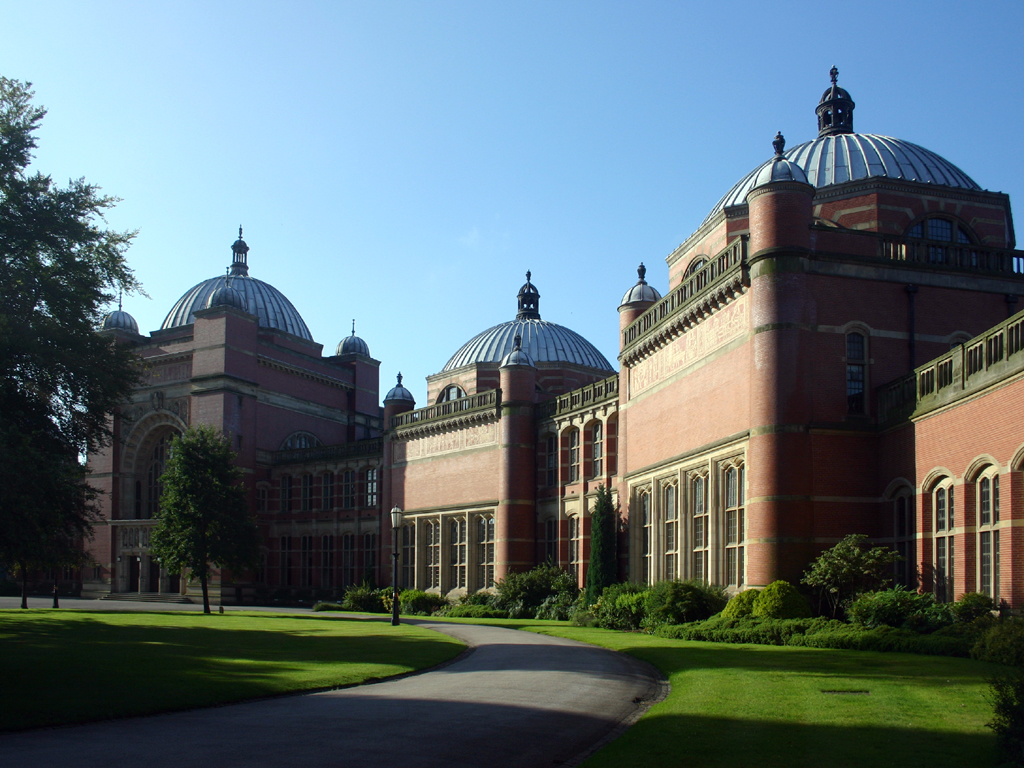
Birmingham University

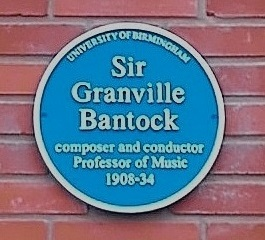
University of Birmingham – blue plaque

Early conducting engagements took him around the world with a musical comedy troupe. With his brother Leedham Bantock he wrote a couple of music hall songs which met with some success. He founded a music magazine, The New Quarterly Music Review, but this lasted only a few years. In 1897, he became conductor at the New Brighton Tower concerts, where he promoted the works of Joseph Holbrooke, Frederic Hymen Cowen, Charles Steggall, Edward German, Hubert Parry, Charles Villiers Stanford, Corder and others, frequently devoting whole concerts to a single composer. He was also conductor of the Liverpool Orchestral Society with which he premiered Delius's Brigg Fair on 18 January 1908. He became the principal of the Birmingham and Midland Institute school of music in 1900. He was a close friend of fellow composer Havergal Brian. He was Peyton Professor of Music at the University of Birmingham from 1908 to 1934 (in which post he succeeded Sir Edward Elgar). In 1934, he was elected Chairman of the Corporation of Trinity College of Music in London. He was knighted in 1930. His students included Anthony Bernard, Lilian Elkington, Eric Fogg, Dorothy Howell, and Maria Matos Priolli.

Bantock was influential in the founding of the City of Birmingham orchestra (later the City of Birmingham Symphony Orchestra), whose first performance in September 1920 was of his overture Saul. His Hebridean Symphony was recorded by the CBO on 28 January 1925 at Riley Hall, Constitution Hill, Birmingham. This acoustic version, conducted by Adrian Boult, was never released.

His music was influenced by folk song of the Hebrides (as in his 1915 Hebridean Symphony) and the works of Richard Wagner. Many of his works have an "exotic" element, including the choral epic Omar Khayyám (1906–09). Among his other better-known works are the overture The Pierrot of the Minute (1908) and the Pagan Symphony (1928). Many of his works have been commercially recorded since the early 1990s.

From 1926 to 1933 Bantock's Birmingham home was Metchley Lodge (now Metchley Abbey; despite the name, the building has no religious connection), which a Birmingham Civic Society blue plaque on the building records.

Shortly after the composer's death in London, in 1946, a Bantock Society was established. Its first president was Jean Sibelius, whose music Bantock championed during the early years of the century. Sibelius dedicated his Third Symphony to Bantock.

Edward Elgar dedicated the second of his Pomp and Circumstance Marches to Bantock.

In 1898 he married Helena von Schweitzer (1868–1961) who acted as a librettist for him. Granville Bantock was also the father-in-law of the composer Margaret More (1903–1966) via her marriage to Granville's son, Raymond Bantock. Their son, Granville Bantock's grandson, is Gavin Bantock, a poet.

== Bibliography ==
Four biographies have been published on Granville Bantock. The first was authored by his long-time friend and 'secretary', 'Colonel' H. O. Anderton for the Living Masters of Music series in 1915. A brief pamphlet (with a portrait) by King Palmer, part of the Paxton Miniature Biographies series, appeared in 1947. A 'personal portrait' of Bantock by his daughter was published by Dent in 1972. It is an engaging read and contains a number of photographs. An Introduction to the Life and Work of Sir Granville Bantock by Vincent Budd, was published in 2000 by Gnosis Press. It is also illustrated and contains a discographical guide. A larger volume is in progress. In addition to these there is a doctoral thesis by Trevor Bray - Granville Bantock: his life and music - submitted in 1972 to Cambridge University. An extract was published by the Triad Press the following year.

In 2020 J.C. Dressler published Granville Bantock (1868–1946): a Guide to Research (Clemson University Press/Liverpool University Press). This collects together all the primary and secondary sources, including an extensive worklist and discography.

== Discography ==
A broad selection of Bantock's orchestral output, including all the symphonies, has been recorded in an edition by the Hyperion label in performances with the Royal Philharmonic Orchestra conducted by Vernon Handley, now available also as a box set. Handley also recorded a largely complete performance of Omar Khayyám with the BBC Symphony Orchestra and Chorus on the Chandos label. However, the only complete recording is available on the Lyrita Recorded Edition label. An alternative recording of the Hebridean Symphony (together with the Old English Suite and Russian Scenes) is available on the Naxos label, with the Czechoslovak Philharmonic Orchestra (Košice) conducted by Adrian Leaper. Historic recordings of miniatures and songs have appeared on the Dutton label. The Cameo Classics label has re-issued its Granville Bantock recordings made with conductor Geoffrey Heald-Smith from 1978 to 1982 on a double CD set, which includes the Hebridean Symphony (in the presence of Raymond Bantock), the Pagan Symphony and Witch of Atlas (the first digital recordings), and the Sapphic Poem (solo cello, Gillian Thoday).

== Selected works ==
=== Operas ===
- The Pearl of Iran, a romantic opera (1894, one act, libretto by composer)
- Caedmar, a Romantic Opera (1892, one act, libretto by Frederick Corder, performed at the Royal Academy of Music, 12 July 1892, and then at Crystal Palace, 18 October 1892 and the Olympic Theatre, 25 October 1892)
- The Seal Woman, a Celtic Folk Opera (libretto by Marjory Kennedy-Fraser who also appeared in the performance as an old crone, utilising melodies drawn from Kennedy-Fraser's collection of Hebridean folk songs, conducted by the composer, Birmingham Repertory Company, 27 September 1924, produced by Barry Jackson)
- Eugene Aram (opera in four acts, unfinished, libretto based on Bulwer Lytton and Thomas Hood, performed as a recitation in 1892)

=== Choral works ===
- The Fire Worshippers, dramatic cantata for solo voices chorus and orchestra (1892, after Thomas Moore's Lalla Rookh, prelude conducted by August Manns at the Crystal Palace)
- Christus, a Festival Symphony in ten parts for solo voices chorus and orchestra (only two parts completed: "Christ in the Wilderness" – Gloucester Festival 1907; and "Gethsemane")
- The Time Spirit, rhapsody for chorus and orchestra (text H.F.B. i.e. Helena F. Bantock, dedicated to Herbert Brewer);
- Sea Wanderers, poem for chorus and orchestra (text H.F.B. i.e. Helena F. Bantock)
- Omar Khayyám for solo voices chorus and orchestra – Part I (Birmingham Festival, 1906), Part II (Cardiff Festival 1907), Part III (Birmingham Festival 1909, BBCSO/Del Mar, 27 November 1968, first broadcast performance); complete (based on the third version of Fitzgerald's adaptation, London Choral Society/Arthur Fagge, Queen's Hall, February 1910; Vienna, February 1912, BBC Symphony Orchestra under Norman Del Mar, 5–6 January 1979)
- The Song of Liberty for solo voices, chorus and orchestra (1914, for the 21st Festival of the International Labour Party, Bradford)
- The Great God Pan, a Choral Ballet for solo voices, chorus and orchestra (Sheffield Festival 1920)
- The Song of Songs for soloists, double chorus and orchestra (started in 1912 completed 1922; text: Book of Solomon, Three Choirs Festival, Gloucester, 1922, then Dorothy Silk, Frank Mullings, Norman Allin, Hallé, composer, 10 March 1927)
- The Burden of Babylon for chorus, brass and drums (1927, text: Bible)
- The Pilgrim's Progress for solo voices, chorus and orchestra (1928, BBC commission, Queen's Hall, BBC Orchestra and Choral Society / composer, 1928–29 season, 23 November 1928; this was the first appearance for the Choral Society)
- Prometheus Unbound for chorus and orchestra (1936, text by Shelley)
- King Solomon for chorus, narrator and orchestra (1937, for the coronation of King George VI and Queen Elizabeth, BBC SO/Boult, 6 May 1937)

=== Choral unaccompanied works ===
- Atalanta in Calydon, a Choral Symphony (A. C. Swinburne, Liverpool Welsh Choral Union, Gitana Ladies' Choir, Birkenhead and the Manchester Orpheus Glee Society, conducted by Harry Evans, 1912)
- Vanity of Vanities, a Choral Symphony (from Ecclesiastes, Welsh Choral Union, Harry Evans, Liverpool, February 1914)
- A Pageant of Human Life, a Choral Suite (Sir Thomas More)
- The Golden Journey to Samarkand (1922, James Elroy Flecker)
- America – National Song (before 1946, Coolidge)
- Choral Hymn for a Priest's First Mass (1946)

=== For male voice ===
- Mass in B♭ major (liturgical, 1903)
- Choral Suite from the Chinese (1914, Cranmer Byng)
- Suite from Cathay (1923, Ezra Pound)
- Choral Suite (1926, Collins)
- Seven Burdens of Isaiah (1927, Bible)
- Three Sea Songs (1920s, Henry Newbolt)
- Three Cavalier Tunes (1920s, Robert Browning)
- Three Browning Songs (1929)
- Lucifer in Starlight (George Meredith)

=== For solo voice and orchestra ===
- Wulstan – baritone (1892, composer)
- Five Ghazals of Hafiz with a Prelude – baritone (1905, Hafiz translated E. Arnold, BBCSO/Clarence Raybould, 15 December 1937)
- Ferishtah's Fancies – tenor (1905, Robert Browning, renowned interpretation came from Frank Mullings)
- Sappho, nine fragments with a Prelude (1906, Sappho translated by Helena F. Bantock, the Prelude and three of the songs were sung by Edith Clegg with the composer conducting at an RPS concert in 1911–12, first appearances with the Society for both the composer and the singer)
- Pagan Chants – tenor (1917–18, Thorley);
- The Vale of Arden (1919, Alfred Hayes)
- The March – tenor (1919, J. C. Squire)
- The Sphinx, a cycle – baritone or contralto (1941, Oscar Wilde)
- Thomas the Rhymer (1946, traditional)

=== Symphonies ===
- Hebridean Symphony (1913), prefixed with the poem: From the lonely shieling of the misty island / Mountains divide us and the mist of seas/ Yet still the blood is strong, the heart is highland/ And we in dreams behold the Hebrides. Carnegie Trust Award, Glasgow 17 January 1916, Queen's Hall, London Symphony Orchestra/Hamilton Harty, March 1917);
- Pagan Symphony (motto: et ego in Arcadia vixi, dedicated to Raymond Bantock, Paris 3 September 1927, BBC SO/Sir Adrian Boult, 8 May 1936)
- The Cyprian Goddess: Symphony No. 3 (1938/39)
- Celtic Symphony for strings and six harps (1940, BBC Scottish Symphony Orchestra / Raybould, Home Service 24 July 1942 and Birmingham, 25 November 1967)

=== Concertos ===
- Elegiac Poem for cello and orchestra (1898)
- Sapphic Poem for cello and orchestra (1906, dedicated to Willi Lehmann)
- Celtic Poem for cello and orchestra (1914, arrangement of the piece for cello and piano, dedicated to Herbert Withers);
- Hamabdil for cello, harp and strings (1919, part of the Judith incidental music, dedicated to Percy Hall)
- Dramatic Poem for cello and orchestra (1941)

=== Tone poems ===
- Tone Poem No. 1, Thalaba, The Destroyer (1900, after Robert Southey)
- Tone Poem No. 2, Dante and Beatrice (1901, revised 1910, Scottish Orchestra/composer, Glasgow, 24 May 1911, revised version of Dante, London Musical Festival, 1911)
- Tone Poem No. 3, later dubbed Orchestral Drama: Fifine at the Fair (1901, after Browning's Pippa Passes, Birmingham Festival, 1912, conducted by the composer, then Eighth Balfour Gardiner Concert, Queen's Hall, first performance in London, New SO/Gardiner, 18 March 1913; this was to have been given at an RPS concert in the 1911–12 season but was cancelled due to a dispute over fees. Fifine was finally given by the Society on 26 November 1917 conducted by Sir Thomas Beecham). A classic recording of Fifine was made by Beecham conducting the RPO for EMI in 1947. This recording was made under the auspices of the British Council and the Bantock Society
- Tone Poem No. 4, Hudibras (1902, after Samuel Butler)
- Tone Poem No. 5, The Witch of Atlas (1902, after Percy Bysshe Shelley, Worcester Festival)
- Tone Poem No. 6, Lalla Rookh (1902, after Thomas Moore, dedicated to Joseph Holbrooke)

=== Other orchestral works ===
- Two Orchestral Scenes from The Curse of Kehama: (1) Processional, (2) Jaga-Naut (1894, after Robert Southey, Philharmonic Society concert, 1897. The Two Scenes are all that was achieved of a project to complete a cycle of 24 tone poems based on Southey's poem)
- Symphonic Overture with organ, Saul (1894, Chester Cathedral, 1897)
- Russian Scenes, Suite of five pieces for small orchestra (1899)
- Helena: Orchestral Variations on the Theme HFB (The Helena Variations) (1899, dedicated to Helena F. Bantock. "Thoughts and reflections on some of your moods written during a wearisome absence.", Liverpool Orchestral Society, Philharmonic Hall, Liverpool)
- English Scenes, Suite of five pieces for small orchestra (1900)
- Comedy Overture, Pierrot of the Minute (1908, after Ernest Dowson)
- Three Dramatic Dances (1909)
- Old English Suite for small orchestra (1909)
- Overture to a Greek Tragedy (1911, after Sophocles' Oedipus at Colonus)
- From the Far West for strings (1912)
- In the Far East, Serenade for strings (1912)
- Scottish Rhapsody (1913)
- Scenes from the Scottish Highlands, Suite for strings (1913)
- The Land of the Gael, Suite for strings (1915)
- Coronach for strings, harp and organ (1918)
- Suite from Judith (1918)
- Festal Hymn of Judith (1918)
- The Sea Reivers, an Orchestral Ballad (1920, a discarded scherzo from the Hebridean Symphony)
- Caristiona, A Hebridean Seascape (1920, revised in 1943–44 with The Sea Reivers and published as Two Hebridean Sea Poems)
- Comedy Overture, The Frogs (1935, Aristophanes, Proms, Queen's Hall, 1936)
- Two Marches for the Ceylon Police (1930s?)
- Four Chinese Landscapes (1936)
- Aphrodite in Cyprus, Symphonic Ode (1938–39)
- Macbeth Overture (1940, utilising material from the incidental music)
- Comedy Overture, Circus Life (1941, adapted from the overture to the incidental music for A Marionette Show)
- Overture to a Greek Comedy, The Women's Festival (1941, Aristophanes)
- Two Heroic Ballads. 1: Cuchullan's Lament, 2: Kishmul's Galley (November 1944)
- Bach 'Wachet Auf' arranged for small orchestra (1945)
- Comedy Overture, The Birds (1946, after Aristophanes, Birmingham Town Hall, conducted by Dr Christopher Edmunds)
- The Funeral (1946)

=== Works for brass band ===
- Festival March (1914, written for Keir Hardie for the Twenty-first International Labour Party Conference, Bradford)
- Oriental Rhapsody (1930, founded on the Tone Poem, Lalla Rookh, Open Championship, Eccles Borough Band/J. Dow, 1930)
- Prometheus Unbound (Symphonic Prelude) (1933, after Shelley, arrangement of Prelude to Prometheus Unbound for chorus and orchestra, 1933 National Championship, Foden's Motor Works Band/Fred Mortimer)
- Overture to Shakespeare's King Lear (completed on 30/11/1932, for the Callender's Cable Works Band, Erith, Kent and dedicated 'To Charles Pipkin Esq. and the members of Callender's Band'. The work remained unpublished until 2021 when it was published by PHM Publishing in a performing edition by Paul Hindmarsh, with the agreement of the Bantock Estate)
- Suite, Russian Melodies (1942–43)
- Two Irish Melodies (1942–43)
- Three Scottish Melodies (1942–43)
- Two Welsh Melodies (1942–43)
- Orion (Dramatic Overture) (1945)
- The Land-of-the-ever-Young (Tir-nan-Og), Hebridean Sea-Poem (1945)
- Kubla Khan
- Peter go ring dem bells – hymn arrangement
- The Frogs of Aristophanes – arranged by Frank Wright

=== Incidental music ===
- Rameses II (very early work, five acts, composer)
- Hippolytus (1908, Euripides, in Gilbert Murray's translation, London Gaiety Theatre, 1908)
- Elektra (1909, Sophocles, London Bedford College, July 1909)
- The Cortège, a Harlequinade (1918)
- Salome, The Dance of the Seven Veils (1918, Oscar Wilde, Court Theatre, London, 19 April 1918)
- Judith (1919, Arnold Bennett, Eastbourne and Kingsway Theatre, London, 1919)
- Macbeth (1926, Shakespeare, Sybil Thorndike's Prince Theatre, London production with Thorndike, Henry Ainley, Lewis Casson, and design by Frank Brangwyn, 1926, music later incorporated in Macbeth Overture)
- Fairy Gold, a Fairy Play (1938, Alvin Langdon Coburn, Hinton, July 1938)

=== Chamber music ===
- String Quartet in C minor (1899)
- Serenade for horns (1903)
- Pibroch, a Highland Lament for cello and harp (1917)
- Hamabdil for cello and piano (1919)
- Viola Sonata in F major (1919, To Colleen)
- Fantastic Poem for cello and piano (1924)
- Sonata in G minor for solo cello (1924, dedicated to Cyril Cope)
- Violin Sonata No. 1 in G major (1929, dedicated to Albert Sammons)
- Pagan Poem for flute and piano (1930)
- Violin Sonata No. 2 in D major (1932, dedicated to Arthur Caterall)
- A Chinese Mirror for string quartet (1933, arrangements from the Chinese Poems, first set)
- Viola Sonata in B minor
- Cello Sonata No. 1 in B minor (1940)
- Violin Sonata No. 3 (1940)
- Cello Sonata No. 2 in F♯ minor (1945)
- Dramatic Poem for cello and piano (1945)

=== Piano music ===
- Suite, a Marionette Show (1918)
- Three Scottish Scenes (1919)
- Lalla Rookh, Tales and Dances (1919)
- The Cloisters at Midnight (New College, Oxford, 1920)
- Arabian Nights (1920, seven pieces, dedicated to Gustav Holst)
- Miniatures (twelve pieces)
- Phantoms (1934)
- Nine Dramatic Poems (1935, Browning)
- Memories of Sapphire (1938) dedicated to Muriel Mann

=== Songs ===
- Songs from the Chinese Poets (Bantock)
  - A feast of lanterns (after 1700s Chinese poet Yuan Mei)
- Songs of the East (Helena Bantock) and many others

A selective list of his compositions is to be found in Grove 5.

== Archives ==
Original autograph scores of most of Granville Bantock's compositions are held at the Cadbury Research Library, University of Birmingham. Further collections of letters from Granville Bantock mainly to his son Raymond Bantock, and from Granville Bantock to Ernest Newman, are also held at the Cadbury Research Library.
