= Henry Shepherd =

Henry Young Shepherd MBE (1857–1947) was the Dean of Antigua from 1906 until 1930.

Shepherd was educated at Codrington College and ordained in 1882. His first post was a curacy at St George, Antigua after which he served his whole career at the Cathedral: first as Rector; then Vicar general and finally Dean.

He died on 30 January 1952.
