= Peter Pinkerton =

Scottish mathematician (1870–1930)

Pinkerton in 1913 St. Andrews Colloquium.

Peter Pinkerton FRSE (8 June 1870 – 21 November 1930) was a Scottish mathematician who served as Rector of Glasgow High School.

== Life ==
He was born on 8 June 1870 in Kilmarnock, the sixth son of John Pinkerton (born 1830) an Irish-born boiler-maker, and his wife, Mary Harvey (born 1835) from Orkney. He was educated at Kilmarnock Academy then studied mathematics at Glasgow University graduating MA in 1890.

In 1893 he became Mathematics Master at Allan Glen's School in Glasgow. In 1899 he moved to Belfast then in 1903 returned to Scotland to teach at George Watson's College in Edinburgh.

In 1905 he was elected a Fellow of the Royal Society of Edinburgh. His proposers were William Thomson, Lord Kelvin, William Jack, Andrew Gray and George Alexander Gibson. At this time he lived at 36 Morningside Grove in southwest Edinburgh.

Glasgow University awarded him two honorary doctorates: DSc in 1909 and LLD in 1930.

From 1914 until death he was Rector of Glasgow High School.

He died in Glasgow on 21 November 1930.

== Family ==
His wife died early in life but they had one son, Dr Herbert Harvey Pinkerton (1901–1982) a physician and noted amateur golfer.

== Publications ==
- Elements of Analytical Geometry (1911)
