= Piano Quartet (Matthay) =

Musical composition

Tobias Matthay's Piano Quartet in C major, Op. 20 is a composition for piano, violin, viola and cello that was completed in 1882, but not published until 1906 following revision in 1905, with a dedication to fellow composer John Blackwood McEwen.

The quartet comprises a single multi-tempo movement marked Maestoso – Allegro – Grandioso – Tempo I – Animato
