= Edinburgh Mathematical Society =

Learned society devoted mathematics

- Abbreviation: EMS
- Formation: 1883; 143 years ago
- Type: Mathematical society
- Location: Scotland
- President: Beatrice Pelloni
- Award: Sir Edmund Whittaker Memorial Prize
- Website: www.ems.ac.uk

The Edinburgh Mathematical Society is a mathematical society for academics in Scotland.

== History ==
The Society was founded in 1883 by a group of Edinburgh school teachers and academics, on the initiative of Alexander Yule Fraser FRSE and Andrew Jeffrey Gunion Barclay FRSE, both maths teachers at George Watson's College, and Cargill Gilston Knott, the assistant of Peter Guthrie Tait, professor of physics at the University of Edinburgh. The first president, elected at first meeting on 2 February 1883, was J.S. Mackay, the head mathematics master at the Edinburgh Academy.

The Society was founded at a time when mathematics societies were being created around the world, but it was unusual in being founded by school teachers rather than university lecturers. This was because, due to the very small number of mathematical academic positions in Scotland at the time, many skilled mathematics graduates chose to become schoolteachers instead. The fifty five founding members contained teachers, ministers and students, as well as a number of academics from the University of Cambridge. The proportion of teachers remained high compared to other mathematical societies, and by 1926 university members made up only one-third of the total members. However, the dominance of teachers in the numbers of the society declined towards the 1930s, and between 1930 and 1935 no papers were presented in the Proceedings by teachers. This was due to an increase in the number of academic positions available and the new requirement for teachers to undergo an additional year of vocational training.

The Edinburgh Mathematical Society is now mainly for academics.

== Activity ==
The Society organises and funds meetings and other research events throughout Scotland. There are normally eight meetings a year, at which talks are presented by mathematicians.

Every four years it awards the Sir Edmund Whittaker Memorial Prize to an outstanding mathematician with a Scottish connection. The Society is a corporate member of the European Mathematical Society, and in 2008 it became a member of the Council for the Mathematical Sciences.

== Journals ==
The society releases an academic journal, the Proceedings of the Edinburgh Mathematical Society, published by Cambridge University Press (ISSN 0013–0915.) The Proceedings were first published in 1884, and are issued three times a year, covering a range of pure and applied mathematics subjects.

Between 1909 and 1961, the Society also published the Edinburgh Mathematical Notes, on the suggestion of George Alexander Gibson, a professor at the University of Glasgow, who wished to remove the more elementary or pedagogical articles from the Proceedings.

== See also ==
- List of Mathematical Societies
