= Harold Sheppard (English cricketer) =

English cricketer

Personal information
- Full name: Harold Holmes Sheppard
- Born: 20 May 1889; Pewsey, Wiltshire, England
- Died: 28 July 1978 (aged 89); Sherborne, Dorset, England
- Batting: Right-handed
- Bowling: Left-arm medium
- Relatives: Harold Sheppard (son)

Domestic team information
- Years: Team
- 1910: Wiltshire
- 1924: Scotland

Career statistics
| Competition | First-class |
|---|---|
| Matches | 1 |
| Runs scored | 15 |
| Batting average | 7.50 |
| 100s/50s | –/– |
| Top score | 9 |
| Balls bowled | 126 |
| Wickets | 0 |
| Bowling average | – |
| 5 wickets in innings | – |
| 10 wickets in match | – |
| Best bowling | – |
| Catches/stumpings | 1/– |
- Source: Cricinfo, 29 June 2019

Harold Holmes Sheppard (20 May 1889 – 28 July 1978) was an English first-class cricketer.

Sheppard was born in May 1899 at Pewsey, Wiltshire. He made his debut in minor counties cricket for Wiltshire in 1910, making two appearances in Minor Counties Championship against Buckinghamshire and Monmouthshire. He later moved to Scotland, where he made a single appearance in first-class cricket for Scotland against the touring South Africans at Glasgow in 1924. Batting twice in the match, he was dismissed for 6 runs by Buster Nupen in Scotland's first-innings of 36 all out, while in their second-innings of 67 all out he was dismissed for 9 runs by Claude Carter. He bowled 21 wicketless overs in the South Africans only innings, conceding 63 runs. He returned to England at somepoint after 1924, where he died at Sherborne in July 1978. Outside of cricket he was a newsagent. His son, Harold junior, also played first-class cricket for Scotland.
