= Harry Shepherd (baseball) =

American baseball player

- Outfielder

Negro league baseball debut
- 1938, for the Indianapolis ABCs

Last appearance
- 1938, for the Indianapolis ABCs

Teams
- Indianapolis ABCs (1938)

Harry Shepherd is an American former Negro league outfielder who played in the 1930s.

Shepherd played for the Indianapolis ABCs in 1938. In seven recorded games, he posted two hits in 17 plate appearances.
