= Norman Macfarlane, Baron Macfarlane of Bearsden =

British businessman and peer (1926–2021)

The Right Honourable The Lord Macfarlane of Bearsden KT DL FRSE

Member of the House of Lords
- Lord Temporal
- Life peerage 29 July 1991 – 21 July 2016

Personal details
- Born: Norman Somerville Macfarlane; 5 March 1926
- Died: 5 November 2021 (aged 95)
- Party: Conservative

Norman Somerville Macfarlane, Baron Macfarlane of Bearsden, KT, DL, FRSE (5 March 1926 – 5 November 2021) was a Scottish industrialist and member of the House of Lords who sat as a Conservative.

== Biography ==
Educated at the High School of Glasgow and later a Royal Artillery Officer in the British military personnel of the Palestine Emergency, Macfarlane was a Member of the Council of the Confederation of British Industry (Scotland) from 1975 to 1981, a Board Member of the Scottish Development Agency from 1979 to 1987, and a Member of the Royal Fine Art Commission for Scotland from 1980 to 1982. Macfarlane received a knighthood on 9 February 1983, was a Deputy Lieutenant and was created a life peer with the title Baron Macfarlane of Bearsden, in the District of Bearsden and Milngavie, for the Conservative Party, on 29 July 1991 and made a Knight of the Most Ancient and Most Noble Order of the Thistle on 3 December 1996. He retired from the House of Lords on 21 July 2016.

Macfarlane was Lord High Commissioner to the General Assembly of the Church of Scotland in 1992, 1993 and 1997. He had been a member of Glasgow Art Club since 1969. In 1991, he was elected a Fellow of the Royal Society of Edinburgh. Macfarlane was Honorary Patron of Queen's Park Football Club.

== Death ==
Macfarlane died on 5 November 2021, at the age of 95.

== Arms ==
Coat of arms of Norman Macfarlane, Baron Macfarlane of Bearsden
Notes Granted in 1994 Crest A demi-bull Sable horned unguled and winged Or charged on the shoulder with a roundel gyronny of eight Or and Sable ensigned with a cross crosslet fitchée Or. Escutcheon Argent a saltire engrailed between four roses Gules on a chief Azure a billet bendways between in dexter two quill pens in saltire Argent and in sinister a stalk of barley with three ears conjoined at the stalk slipped and bladed all Or. Supporters Two Macfarlane clansmen of the 18th century each with a single feather in his bonnet a targe resting against the exterior leg and holding a sword in the exterior hand all Proper the said supporters being limited to his Lordship for life. Motto Sursim Semper
