= Harold Sheppard (Scottish cricketer) =

Scottish cricketer and solicitor

Personal information
- Full name: Harold Frederick Sheppard
- Born: 11 September 1917; Glasgow, Lanarkshire, Scotland
- Died: 7 July 1997 (aged 79); Port Erin, Rushen, Isle of Man
- Batting: Right-handed
- Relatives: Harold Sheppard (father)

Domestic team information
- Years: Team
- 1938–1952: Scotland

Career statistics
Competition	First-class
Matches	13
Runs scored	509
Batting average	24.84
100s/50s	–/2
Top score	72
Balls bowled	6
Wickets	0
Bowling average	–
5 wickets in innings	–
10 wickets in match	–
Best bowling	–
Catches/stumpings	11/–
- Source: Cricinfo, 8 July 2022

Harold Frederick Sheppard (11 September 1917 — 7 July 1997) was a Scottish first-class cricketer and solicitor.

The son of the English cricketer Harold Sheppard, he was born at Glasgow in September 1917. He was educated at the High School of Glasgow, before matriculating to the University of Glasgow to study law. A club cricketer for Glasgow University and Poloc Cricket Club, he made his debut for Scotland in first-class cricket against Ireland at Glasgow in 1938, with Sheppard appearing again in the same season against Yorkshire at Harrogate as part of Scotland's tour of England. He served in the British Army during the Second World War, being commissioned as a second lieutenant in the Royal Artillery in February 1943, with promotion to the war substantive rank of lieutenant following in April 1944.

Following the war, he resumed playing first-class cricket for Scotland, making a further eleven first-class appearances until 1952. Playing as a batsman in the Scottish side, he scored 509 runs in his thirteen appearances, at an average of 22.13; he made two half centuries, with his highest score of 72 coming against Ireland in 1952. Sheppard later emigrated to Singapore, where he was a notary public and commissioner of oaths. He returned to the British Isles in later life, where he died at Port Erin on the Isle of Man in July 1997.
