= High School of Glasgow =

Private school in Glasgow, Scotland

Coordinates: 55°53′13″N 4°19′38″W

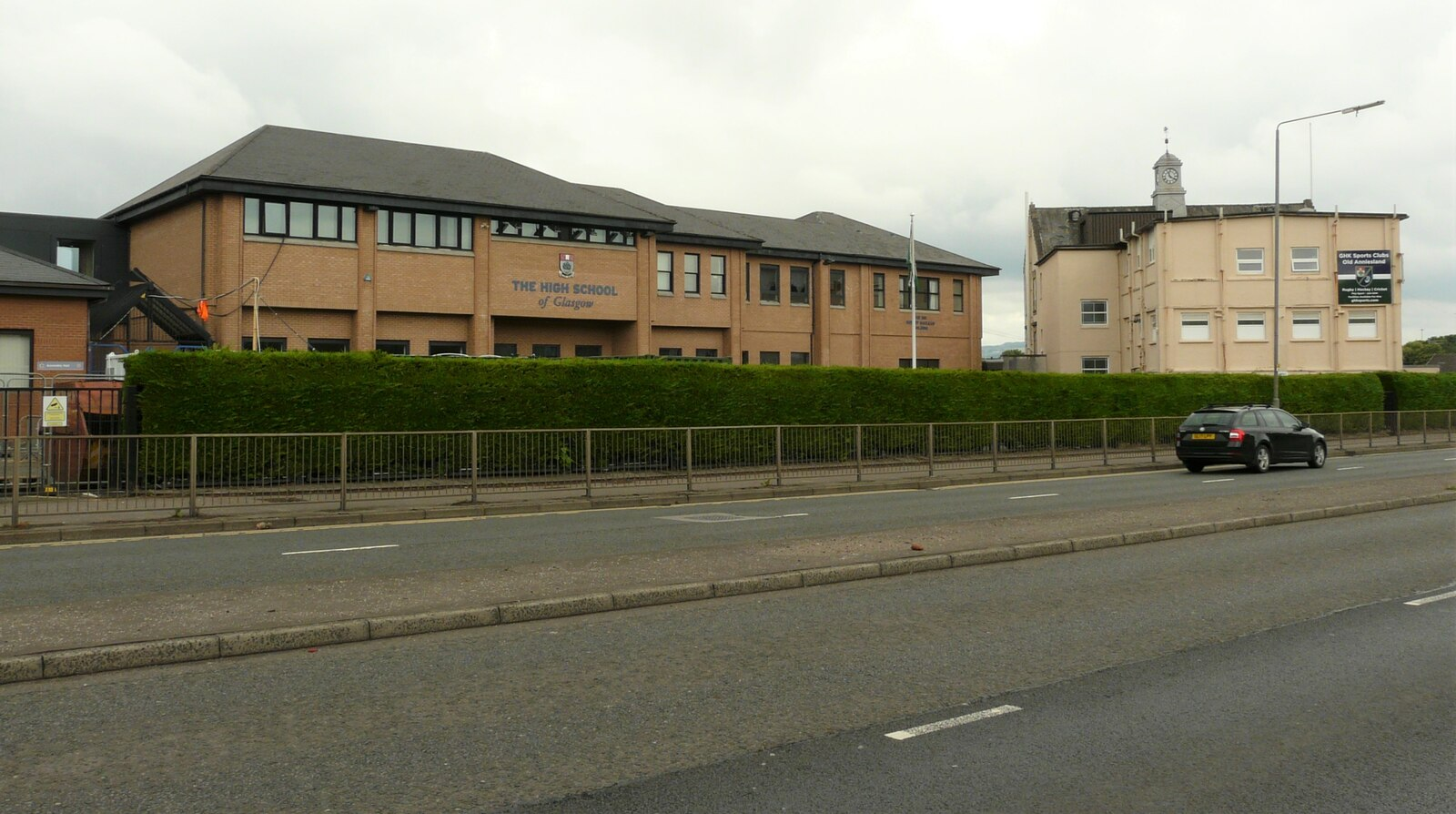

Location
- Old Anniesland; 637 Crow Road; Glasgow, G13 1PL; Scotland

Information
- Type: Private
- Motto: Sursum Semper (Always Upward)
- Established: c. 1124; 902 years ago (refounded 1976)
- Founder: Glasgow Cathedral
- Local authority: Glasgow City Council
- Chair of Governors: Greig Williamson
- Rector: Antonia Berry
- Gender: Mixed
- Age: 3 to 18
- Enrolment: 687 (senior school)
- Houses: Bannerman; Clyde; Law; Moore
Colour
- School Years: KG-S6
- Website: http://www.glasgowhigh.com/

The High School of Glasgow is a private, co-educational day school in Glasgow, Scotland. It is the 2026 Sunday Times Scottish Independent School of the Year and the top performing school in the west of Scotland at National 5, Higher and Advanced Higher levels. In 2026, 80% of all Highers sat at the school were awarded an A. The original High School of Glasgow was founded as the choir school of Glasgow Cathedral in around 1124, and is the oldest school in Scotland, and the twelfth oldest in the United Kingdom. On its closure as a selective grammar school by Glasgow City Corporation in 1976, it immediately continued as a co-educational independent school as a result of fundraising activity by its Former Pupil Club and via a merge by the Club with Drewsteignton School. The school maintains a relationship with the Cathedral, where it holds an annual service of commemoration and thanksgiving in September. It counts two British Prime Ministers, two Lords President and the founder of the University of Aberdeen among its alumni.

It is a selective school, meaning prospective pupils must sit an entrance test to gain admission. In 2009 and 2017, The Times placed it as the top independent school in Scotland for SQA results.

The rector of the school is Antonia Berry, who took over from the retiring John O'Neill in the summer of 2025.

== History ==
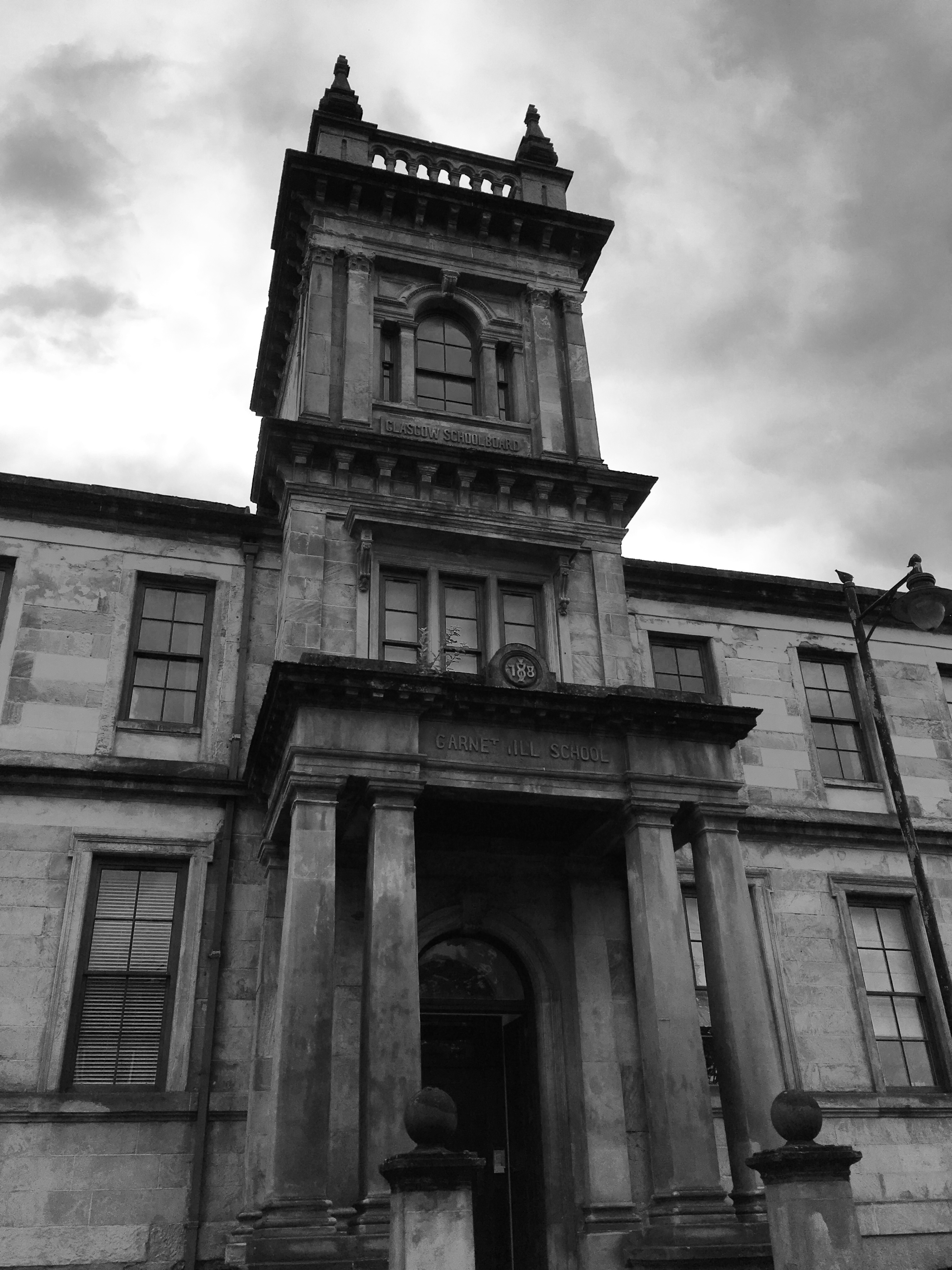
High School For Girls, Garnethill, Glasgow

The original school was founded as the Choir School of Glasgow Cathedral in around 1124, and later became known as Glasgow Grammar School. It was housed in Greyfriar's Wynd until 1782, when it moved to new purpose-built accommodation in George Street, but it moved again in 1821 to new premises between John Street and Montrose Street. The name was changed in 1834 to The High School of Glasgow, and in 1872 it was transferred to the management of the Glasgow School Board. In 1878, the school moved into the former premises of the Glasgow Academy on Elmbank Street, when the latter moved to its new home in Kelvinbridge in the West End of the city. The Glasgow High School for Girls was founded in 1894 and housed variously in Garnethill and Kelvindale.

In 1879 a football XI from the school entered the 1879–80 Scottish Cup. Given the difficulties of raising a team at the start of the school term, the school was allowed to enter at the second round stage, but lost 4–1 to Possilpark at Burnbank Park (the home of 1st Lanarkshire Rifle Volunteers F.C.), the lack of practice telling the difference. The school entered the following year but scratched when drawn to the same opponents.

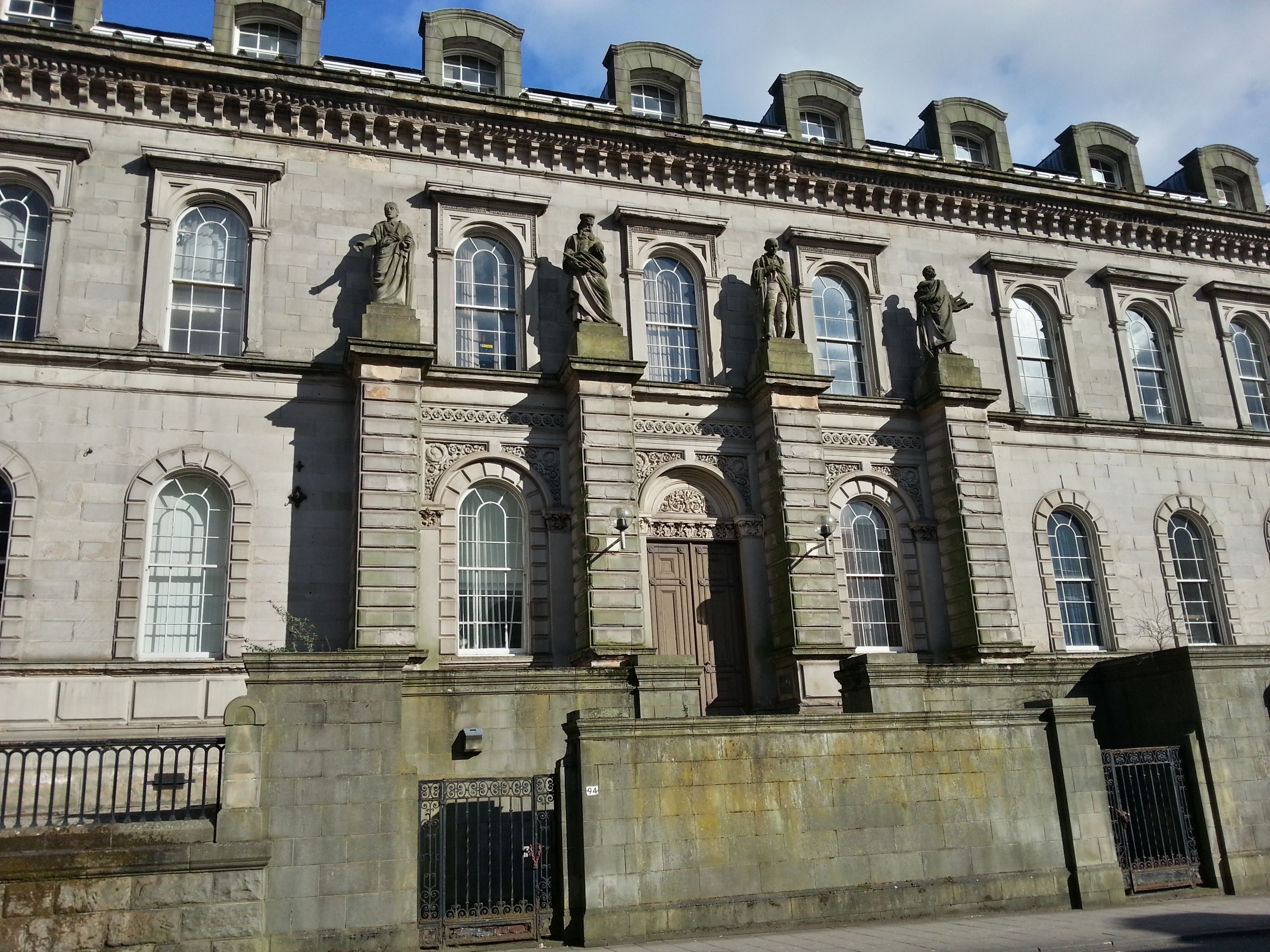
Main building of the boys' school at 94 Elmbank Street, built 1846.

In 1976, the regional council closed the Boys' High School, while the Girls' High School began admitting boys and was renamed Cleveden Secondary School. The proposed closure was met with anger from former pupils, and the day after the closure of the Boys' High School, the new, independent, co-educational high school was created, following a merger involving the former pupils' association, the Glasgow High School Club, and Drewsteignton School in Bearsden, which effectively became the new high school. The new school moved to a site on Crow Road, which had been a playing field owned by the Glasgow High School Club. In 1983, an arts and science extension was opened. The former boys' school buildings on Elmbank Street were converted to become part of Strathclyde House, headquarters of Strathclyde Regional Council, with the old school assembly hall becoming the council chamber.

== Today ==
Embroidery of the school badge, showing the items from the Glasgow Story and the school's motto

The new, purpose-built senior school (Transitus to S6) is in Old Anniesland, owned by the Glasgow High School Club (below). There have been multiple extensions to these buildings, including the two-storey science block. The junior school (kindergarten to P6) occupies the site of the former Drewsteignton School, on Ledcameroch Road in Old Bearsden. The headmistress of the junior school is Heather Fuller.

== Glasgow High School Club ==
Glasgow High School Club
- Location: Old Anniesland, Glasgow, Scotland, United Kingdom
- President Honorary President: Craig Macdonald; The Lord Macfarlane of Bearsden
- Website: http://ghscl.org.uk/

The Glasgow High School Club is the former pupil club of the high school and its predecessor schools, the High School for Boys, the Girls' High School and Drewsteignton School.

The club is a limited company, run by a committee and a president, who is elected annually. The president is Craig Macdonald, and the past president is Ronnie Gourley. The honorary president is The Lord Macfarlane of Bearsden, and the previous Rector of the School, John O'Neill, is an ex officio member. The rest of the committee comprises three honorary vice presidents, senior vice president, junior vice president, secretary, treasurer, house convenor, seven ordinary members, GHK Rugby president, triathlon representative, president of the ladies' section and president of ladies' hockey.

The club owns Old Anniesland, the site on which the school now stands, and is based in the pavilion. The club runs all the facilities at Old Anniesland, including the Jimmie Ireland Stand but excluding the school. Use of the club's facilities is restricted to members. The club runs a number of sports teams, although the former Glasgow High Kelvinside (GHK) rugby club merged in 1997 with rivals Glasgow Academicals FC to form Glasgow Hawks. The name was intended as an acronym of High, Accies, West (of Scotland) and Kelvinside, however West of Scotland declined the invitation to merge into the new team and continue to play separately from their ground in Milngavie. The friendly rivalry with the Glasgow Accies, based at neighbouring New Anniesland, inspired the name of the Anniesland Trophy, an annual golf competition between the clubs.

The club also has an active London branch, The London Club, which hosts a dinner every March at the Caledonian Club and a lunch in early October for recent leavers moving to study in London. The London Club also runs a number of sports teams, particularly golf.

== Notable alumni ==
Notable former pupils of the high school have included two prime ministers, the founder of the University of Aberdeen, the current and most recent principals of the University of Glasgow and numerous judges and law officers, including two former Lord President of the Court of Session, as well as politicians, businessmen and academics.

=== Academia ===
- Ross Anderson, professor of security engineering, University of Cambridge
- Duncan Inglis Cameron, secretary of Heriot-Watt University
- Sir Ian Heilbron, professor of organic chemistry at Imperial College London
- Sir Joseph Dalton Hooker, botanist, president of the Royal Society
- John Horne, geologist
- Professor Sheila McLean, director, Institute of Law and Ethics in Medicine, University of Glasgow School of Law
- Sir Mungo William MacCallum, vice-chancellor of the University of Sydney
- Sir Anton Muscatelli, economist, Principal of the University of Glasgow
- Sir Muir Russell, Principal of the University of Glasgow
- Professor Sir Thomas Smith, general editor, The Laws of Scotland: Stair Memorial Encyclopædia
- Bernard Wasserstein, historian

=== Arts ===
- Thomas Campbell, poet
- Norman Fulton, composer
- Avril Gibb, artist and calligrapher
- Graeme Kelling, guitarist with Deacon Blue
- Edwin Morgan OBE, poet, The Scots Makar
- Eric Woolfson, songwriter and musician

=== Business ===
- John Bannerman, Baron Bannerman of Kildonan, farmer and Liberal Politician
- William Beardmore, 1st Baron Invernairn, industrialist
- John Elder, shipbuilder
- Norman Macfarlane, Baron Macfarlane of Bearsden KT, industrialist and life peer
- James Mavor, economist
- William Smart, economist

=== Law ===
- Hazel Cosgrove, Lady Cosgrove, first female senator of the College of Justice (retired)
- Charles Dickson, Lord Dickson, Lord Justice Clerk and Lord Advocate
- George Emslie, Baron Emslie, Lord President of the Court of Session
- David Fleming, Lord Fleming, senator of the College of Justice and Solicitor General
- Arthur Campbell Hamilton, Lord Hamilton, Lord President of the Court of Session
- Harald Leslie, Lord Birsay, chairman of the Scottish Land Court
- Alexander Philip, Lord Philip, senator of the College of Justice
- Harold Sheppard, solicitor and public notary in Singapore
- Henry Wilson, Baron Wilson of Langside, Lord Advocate
- Roddy Dunlop, Dean of the Faculty of Advocates from 2020

=== Media ===
- Muriel Gray, journalist and broadcaster
- Fyfe Robertson, Scottish television journalist
- Katharine Whitehorn, journalist and feminist
- Susan Calman, comedian and panellist

=== Military ===
- Field Marshal Colin Campbell, 1st Baron Clyde, senior British Army officer
- Lieutenant-General Sir John Moore, senior British Army officer
- Surgeon Vice Admiral Alasdair Walker, senior Royal Navy officer and Surgeon-General

=== Politics ===
- Sir Henry Campbell-Bannerman, prime minister
- Bonar Law, prime minister
- James Bryce, British Ambassador to the United States
- John Annan Bryce, Liberal Party UK MP
- Sir Henry Craik, 1st Baronet, MP for Glasgow and Aberdeen Universities
- Barry Gardiner, Labour Party UK MP
- James Gray, Conservative Party UK MP
- Iain MacCormick, Scottish National Party MP
- Professor Sir Neil MacCormick, jurist and SNP MEP
- Anna McCurley, Conservative Party UK MP
- John Macdonald, Liberal Party UK MP
- Sir Walter Menzies, Liberal Party UK MP
- Anne Pringle, ambassador to Russia
- Steve Rodan, Speaker of the House of Keys
- Sir Teddy Taylor, Conservative Party UK MP
- Charles Gray, HM Ambassador to the Kingdom of Morocco and latterly Marshall of the Diplomatic Corps

=== Religion ===
- William Elphinstone, Bishop of Aberdeen and founder of the University of Aberdeen
- Robert Reid Kalley, physician and missionary to Portuguese-speaking territories
- David Lacy, Moderator of the General Assembly of the Church of Scotland, 2005
- David Lunan, Moderator of the General Assembly of the Church of Scotland, 2008
- R Guy Ramsay, Baptist minister and president of the Baptist Union of Scotland, 1948–49
- Very Revd Dr John R Gray, minister of Dunblane Cathedral and Moderator of the General Assembly

=== Science ===
- Fergus Campbell FRS, Professor of Physiology
- Sir James Hough FRS, physicist, leader in the discovery of gravitational waves
- Halliday Sutherland, physician and author

=== Sport ===
- John Christie, cricketer
- Bobby Clark, Aberdeen FC and Scotland goalkeeper
- Walter Coulter, amateur footballer
- Frank Deighton, golfer
- Alison Sheppard, Olympic and Commonwealth swimmer
- Harold Sheppard, cricketer
- Charlie Telfer, footballer

In addition, 29 one-time pupils of the High School have represented Scotland at international level in rugby union. They include John Bannerman, Angus Cameron, Donald Cameron, Jimmy Docherty, John Dykes, George Frew, Jimmy Ireland, Hamish Kemp, Ian Shaw and Robert Wilson Shaw.

=== Other ===
- Temple Moore, architect
- Ian McDonald, civil servant, spokesman for the Ministry of Defence during the Falklands War

== Notable staff ==
- Donald MacCormick – journalist
- Thomas Muir, mathematician
- Peter Pinkerton FRSE – rector from 1914 to 1930

== See also ==
- List of the oldest schools in the United Kingdom
