= Alexander Yule Fraser =

Scottish mathematician

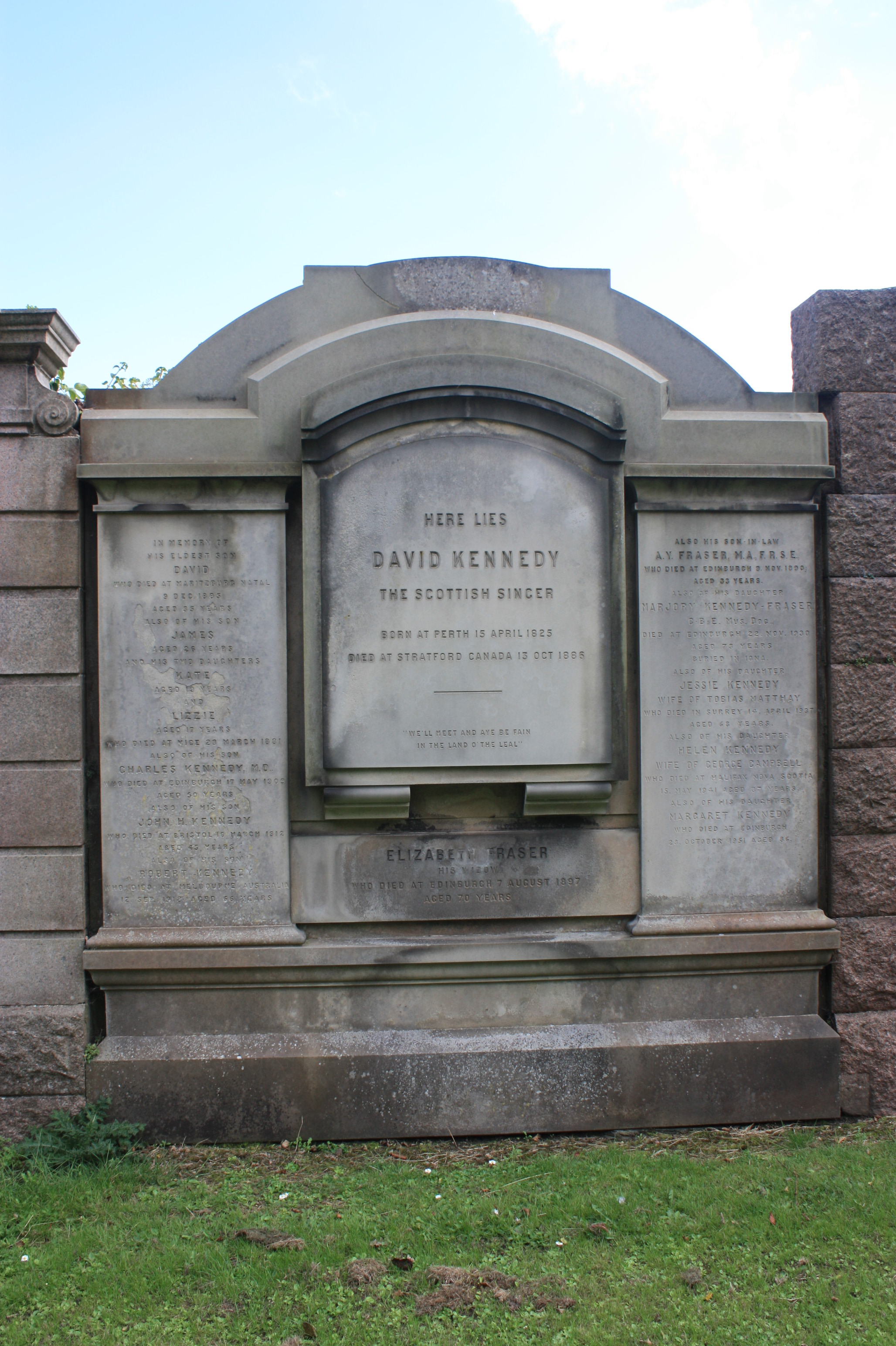
- Kennedy-Fraser grave in Grange Cemetery, Edinburgh
- Born: 3 May 1857; Perth, Scotland
- Died: 9 November 1890 (aged 33); Glasgow, Scotland
- Education: University of Aberdeen
- Known for: Founder of Edinburgh Mathematical Society
- Spouse: Marjory Kennedy-Fraser
- Children: David Kennedy Fraser; Helen Patuffa Hood
- Scientific career
- Fields: Mathematics
- Workplaces: George Watson's College

Alexander (Alec) Yule Fraser (1857–1890) was a Scottish mathematician, one of the founders of the Edinburgh Mathematical Society.

== Life and work ==
Fraser studied at the University of Aberdeen where he graduated in 1881. After that, he was appointed Mathematical Master at George Watson's College (Edinburgh). In 1889 he was appointed Headmaster at Allan Glen's School (Glasgow) but he remained only two months because a severe pleurisy forced him to leave Scotland going to South Africa in search of a better climate. Back to Scotland, his health deteriorated rapidly and died in Glasgow thirty three years old.

Alec married the singer Marjory Kennedy-Fraser in 1887 and they had a couple, David (1888–1962) and Helen Patuffa (1889–1967). David Kennedy Fraser became a psychologist, educator and amateur mathematician. Patuffa was a singer and musician, as her mother.

Fraser is mainly remembered for being one of the founding fathers of the Edinburgh Mathematical Society.

== Bibliography ==
- Hartveit, Marit (2011). The lesser names : the teachers of the Edinburgh Mathematical Society and other aspects of Scottish mathematics, 1867–1946 (PhD Thesis). University of St. Andrews. hdl:10023/1700.
- Mann, A.J.S.; Craik, A.D.D. (2011). "Scotland. Land of opportunity but few rewards". In Raymond Flood; Adrian Rice; Robin Wilson (eds.). Mathematics in Victorian Britain. Oxford University Press. pp. 77–102. ISBN 978-0-19-960139-4.
