= List of people educated at George Watson's College =

Former pupils of George Watson's College in Edinburgh are known as Watsonians, in memory of the school's founder, George Watson. They include the following individuals. See also The Category for Watsonians.

== Culture ==
=== Actors ===
- Peter Baikie, Scottish comedian and composer
- Finlay Currie, actor
- Jack Docherty, Scottish writer, actor, presenter and producer
- James Finlayson, actor
- Gordon Kennedy, actor

=== Architects ===
- Alexander Lorne Campbell
- James Craig
- Gareth Hoskins
- William Kininmonth
- Basil Spence

=== Painters ===
- Douglas Percy Bliss, painter
- Henry Raeburn Dobson, painter

=== Musicians ===
- Ian Anderson, musician with Jethro Tull
- Malcolm Martineau, pianist and recital accompanist
- Myles MacInnes (known as Mylo), singer-songwriter, music producer, and DJ
- Keith McIvor (known as JD Twitch) music producer, and DJ
- Donald Runnicles, conductor
- Robin Williamson, musician with The Incredible String Band

=== Writers – poets, novelists, dramatists ===
- David Daiches, Scottish literary historian and literary critic
- David Kennedy Fraser, educator
- Charles Alexander Malcolm, legal librarian and historical author
- C. J. Sansom, lawyer and novelist
- Rebecca West, writer and campaigner

== Clergy ==
- The Reverend David Arnott, moderator of the General Assembly of the Church of Scotland

== Journalists ==
- Martin Geissler, podcaster, journalist and news presenter at BBC News
- Karin Giannone, journalist and news presenter at BBC News
- Martha Kearney, BBC broadcaster and journalist
- Sheena McDonald, broadcaster and journalist
- Paul Nuki, journalist
- Hugo Rifkind, journalist
- Iain Macwhirter, journalist

== Lawyers and judges ==
- Robert Brown (Robin) Black, GCMG, governor of Hong Kong, 1958–64
- Colin Boyd, Baron Boyd of Duncansby, PC, QC, Lord Advocate, life peer in the British House of Lords
- Alastair Campbell, Lord Bracadale (born 1949) – QC
- Thomas Cooper, 1st Baron Cooper of Culross, Solicitor General for Scotland, Lord Advocate
- John Corrie, politician, MP, MEP
- Sir John Ireland Falconer, WS
- John Charles Fenton, lawyer, Solicitor General for Scotland
- David Maxwell Fyfe, Viscount Kilmuir, Barrister, Home Secretary and Lord Chancellor
- Frances Guy, diplomat (British Ambassador to the Yemen and Lebanon)
- Donald Mackay, Baron Mackay of Drumadoon
- Iain Macphail, Lord Macphail
- Ronald King Murray, Lord Murray, PC, politician and judge, (Labour Party)
- Robert Reed, Lord Reed, judge, Supreme Court of the United Kingdom
- Tun Dato' Sir James Beveridge Thomson, lawyer and judge, chief justice of the Federal Court of Malaysia.

== Military personnel ==
- Major-General Sir Alexander Biggam
- Captain Henry Peel Ritchie, First World War Victoria Cross recipient
- Air Chief Marshal Sir James Robb (RAF officer)
- Rear Admiral George Pirie Thomson, naval officer and Britain's Chief Press Censor in WWII
- Lieutenant General Sir David Young

== Politicians ==
- Malcolm Chisholm, politician
- John Corrie, politician
- David Maxwell Fyfe, 1st Earl of Kilmuir, Home Secretary and Lord Chancellor
- Auckland Geddes, 1st Baron Geddes, politician
- Iain Gray, MSP, former leader of Scottish Labour
- Robin Gray, (New Zealand MP, speaker of House of Representatives)
- Robert Horne, 1st Viscount Horne, Chancellor of the Exchequer
- William Shepherd Morrison, 1st Viscount Dunrossil, Speaker of the House of Commons, Governor-General of Australia
- Ronald King Murray, Lord Murray, politician and judge, (Labour Party)
- Malcolm Rifkind, Foreign Secretary, Defence Secretary, Secretary of State for Scotland (Conservative Party)
- Chris Smith, Baron Smith of Finsbury, former British MP and Cabinet minister (Labour Party)
- Liz Smith, MSP
- David Steel, Baron Steel of Aikwood, politician (Liberal Democrats), MP, former leader of the Liberal Party
- Rebecca West, feminist campaigner
- William Wolfe
- Robert Black (colonial administrator), governor of Hong Kong 1958–1964
- James Stewart Lockhart, Registrar-General of Hong Kong 1887-1901

== Scientists and academics ==
- Sir Eric Anderson, provost of Eton College
- John William Ballantyne, obstetrician and pioneer of female education in the field of medicine
- Rose Ethel Bassin, folklorist, music educator, biographer
- Prof Neil Campbell, chemist
- Prof William Stuart Mcrae Craig, medical author
- Norman Davidson, biochemist
- Janette Dunlop, physicist
- Sir John Flett, geologist
- Ian Frazer, creator of the human papilloma virus vaccine and Australian of the Year 2006
- James Dalgleish Hamilton Jamieson, dentist and academic author
- John Alexander Loraine, endocrinologist
- Keith Moffatt, physicist
- Stan Paterson, glaciologist
- George Hector Percival, physician
- Ian R. Porteous, mathematician
- Gerald Russell, professor of psychiatry
- Agnes Yewande Savage, pioneer woman in medicine in West Africa
- Leslie Skene, psychiatrist
- John Steele, oceanographer
- Joseph Wedderburn, mathematician

== Sportspeople ==
- Martin Bell, skier, and four-time participant in the Winter Olympics
- Gillian Cooke, athlete and bobsledder
- Keith Fraser, Olympic athlete 1992
- Sir Chris Hoy, six-time Olympic gold-medalist track cyclist
- Josh Kerr, 1500m bronze medalist at the 2020 Olympic Games
- Callum McBrierty, world-champion rower 2016, Olympic gold medalist, Rio 2016
- Grace Reid, Olympic diver
- Robin Smith, mountaineer
- Craig Sutherland, professional footballer

=== Cricketers ===
- James Cowan, cricketer
- Leslie Craig, cricketer
- Ian Greig, cricketer
- James Martin, cricketer
- Neil McCallum, cricketer
- William McNab, cricketer
- William Stuart, cricketer
- Thomas Watt, cricketer

=== Rugby players ===
- Marcus Di Rollo
- Adam Hastings
- Gavin Hastings, rugby player
- Scott Hastings, rugby player
- David Johnston international rugby player and professional footballer (Heart of Midlothian)
- Stuart McInally, rugby player
- Debbie McLaren, England, Scotland and Great Britain international rugby union player; was in the inaugural line-up for each of those three international teams.
- Ian Robertson, rugby player and commentator
- Jason White, rugby player
- John Howard Wilson, rugby player
