= Nuki =

Nuki may refer to:

- 2053 Nuki, a minor planet
- Nuki (joinery), a type of Japanese carpentry joint
- Paul Nuki, a medical journalist
- Nuki (smart lock), a smart lock, produced by an eponymous Austrian company.
- Daria Stavrovich, Russian singer, better known by the stage name Nuki
