= Watsonian =

Watsonian may refer to:

- Watsonian Squire, an historic brand name of sidecar for motorcycles
- List of people educated at George Watson's College, former pupils of George Watson's College in Edinburgh, known in some circles at "Watsonians"
- Dr. Watson, a character in the Sherlock Holmes stories by Sir Arthur Conan Doyle
