= Leslie Craig =

Leslie Craig may refer to:

- Les Craig, Australian politician
- Leslie Craig (cricketer), Scottish cricketer and medical doctor

== See also ==
- Craig Lesley, American memoirist and novelist
