= Charlotte Ainslie =

Scottish educationist and headmistress

Charlotte Ainslie OBE
- Born: 15 February 1863; Edinburgh
- Died: 24 August 1960 (aged 97); Edinburgh
- Education: University of St Andrews, Bedford College
- Occupations: Headteacher, educationalist
- Honours: OBE (1929)

Charlotte Edith Ainslie (15 February 1863 – 24 August 1960) was a Scottish educationist and headmistress.

== Life ==
Ainslie was born in Lauriston Place in Edinburgh in 1863, the second daughter of Mary Ann Wood and William Ainslie, a pharmaceutical chemist. Ainslie attended George Watson's Ladies' College and, in 1880, she took the senior level exams and came second. Ainslie studied for the St Andrews University higher certificate for women, whilst she worked abroad for three years. In 1885, she obtained the higher certificate, LLA diploma with honours.

She was able to study at Bedford College in London in 1892 because of a scholarship and her preparation, whilst heading a modern language department in a school in Cornwall for several years. Whilst at Bedford, she won another scholarship on the way to B.A. in 1895. She worked from 1896 to 1900 as assistant headmistress at the Skinners' Company's School for Girls and, from 1901 to 1902, as lecturer in psychology and education at the Cambridge Training College for Women.

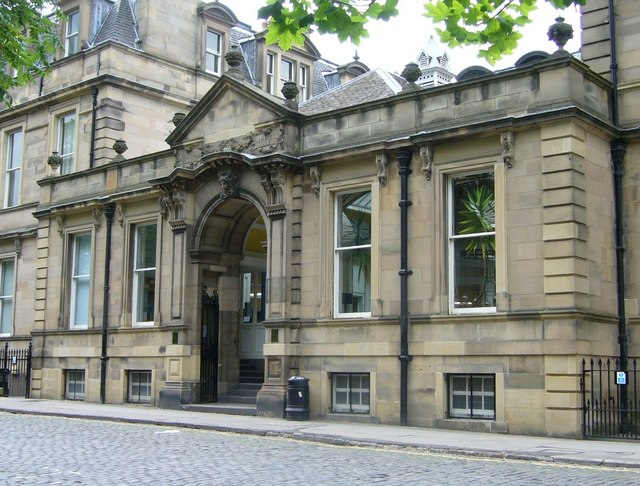
George Square Melville House, built in 1871 on the site of Admiral Duncan's house, was the home of George Watson's Ladies College

In 1902, Ainslie was appointed to be the head of her first school George Watson's Ladies' College. This was the first prestigious Scottish secondary school to appoint a woman head. Ainslie expected discipline and corporal punishment was avoided because pupils obeyed commanding staff members. A student who once greeted the head when meeting her at the weekend was summoned later to explain her impudence. In 1909, she became a governor at Bedford College and she led the Secondary Education Association of Scotland in 1912–13. In 1914, she assembled the school to explain that they were at war to defend freedom. She asked that all assembled should assist in the efforts. In December 1915, the schools sent a nine-pound Christmas pudding to everyone of the 800 people who crewed the dreadnought battleship HMS Orion.

Ainslie encouraged her students' ambitions. She organised subjects that would be of interest to girls, but she felt that girls should always be able to study alongside boys. She was critical of the actual rewards and opportunities available to women. She also campaigned to ensure that every girls' school should have a deputy head who was a woman.

She retired in 1926 and she received a University of Edinburgh honorary LLD degree and an OBE in 1929.

Ainlslie lived in her retirement in Mayfield Terrace, Edinburgh, and died, aged 97, in a nursing home in the city on 24 August 1960.
