= Igor Lobanov =

Russian luger (born 1969)

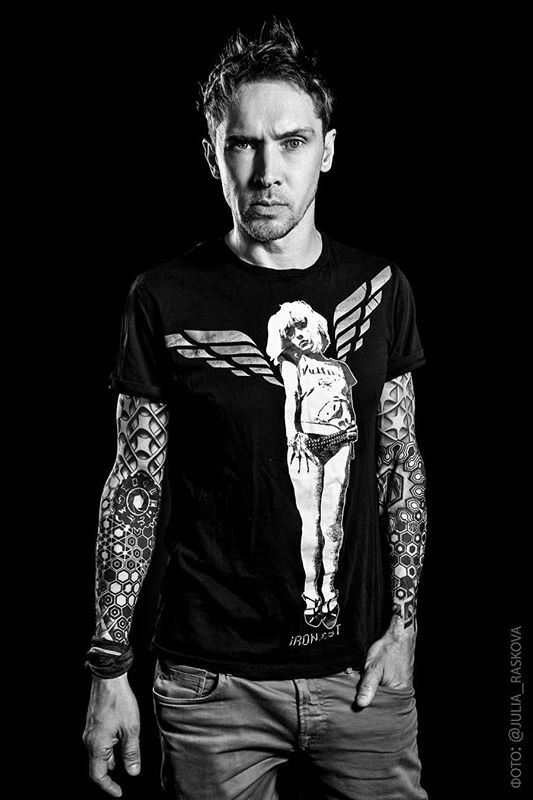

Medal record

Luge

World Championships
Bronze medal – third place	1990 Calgary	Mixed team

Igor Lobanov (Russian: Игорь Лобанов; born July 4, 1969) is a Russian Olympic luger, rock musician and rapper. He competed in luge from the late 1980s to 1990, representing the Soviet Union. He won the bronze medal in the mixed-team event at the 1990 FIL World Luge Championships in Calgary, Alberta, Canada. He is currently the lead singer of the nu metal band Slot.
