= Neuromonakh Feofan =

Russian musician

Neuromonakh Feofan Нейромонах Феофан
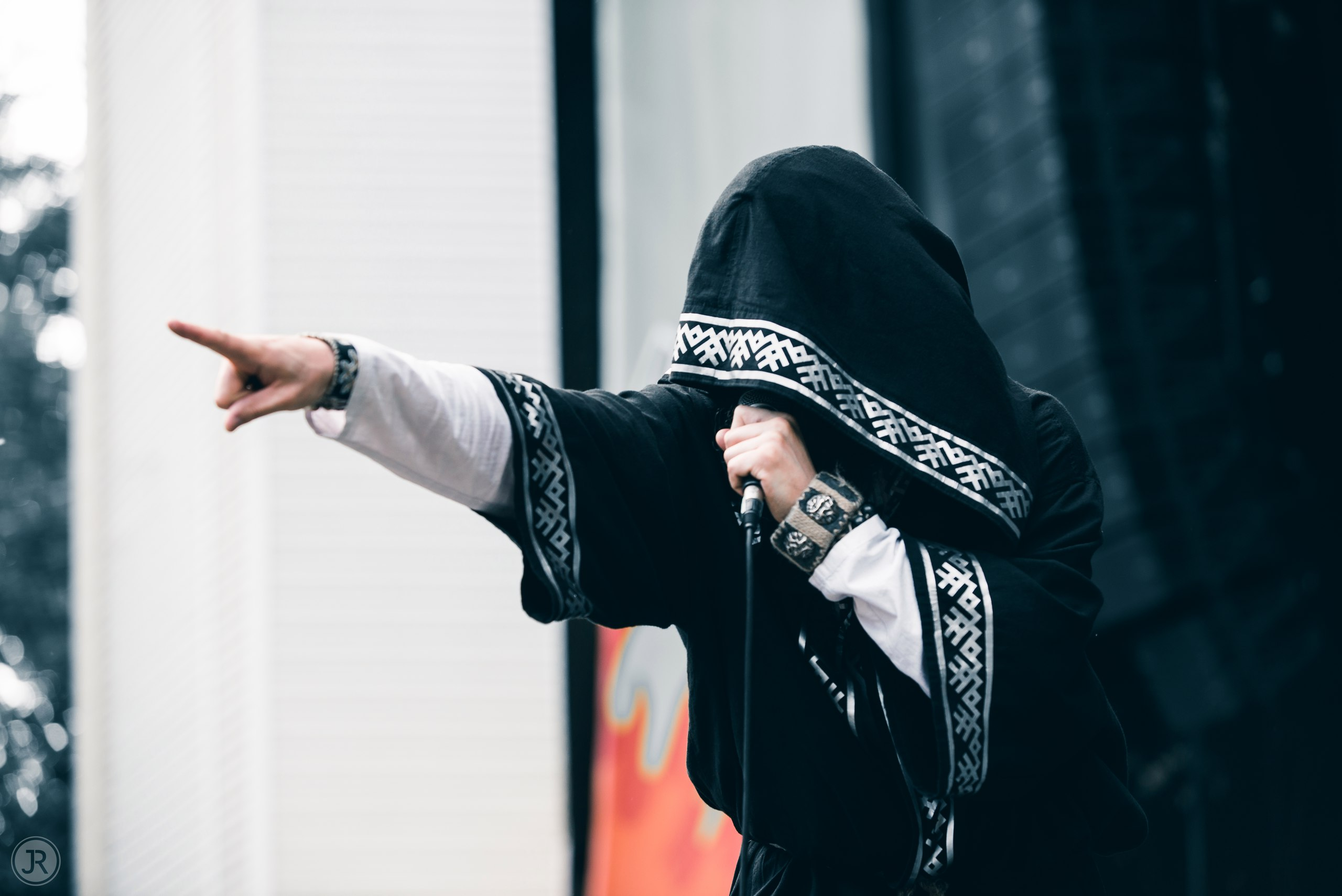
- Neuromonakh Feofan performing at ANABUK Festival, 2016

Background information
- Origin: St Petersburg, Russia
- Genres: Drum'n'Bass; Rave; Folktronica; Alternative dance
- Years active: 2009—present
- Website: http://neurofeofan.ru

Neuromonakh Feofan (Russian: Нейромонáх Феофáн, romanized: Neyromonah Feofan, lit. 'Neuromonk Theophanes') is a musical project from St. Petersburg, Russia, combining drum 'n' bass and Russian folk music.

Neuromonakh Feofan's performances are styled after traditional Russian festivals. The group members perform in bast shoes, kosovorotkas and sarafans. One member performs dressed as a bear. The group's lyrics incorporate Church Slavonic and obsolete Russian words, and they play balalaika over the drum 'n' bass beats.

== Members ==
The project's main members are songwriter and performer Neuromonakh Feofan, DJ Nikodim, and the Bear. The group members remain anonymous, and Neuromonakh Feofan appears on stage with his face covered by an Eastern Orthodox-style hood.

In a 2018 interview, Neuromonakh Feofan revealed that his real name is Oleg Stepanov.

== History ==
In an interview with Afisha magazine, Nikodim stated that he professionally studied music before meeting Feofan. Neuromonakh Feofan had started recording songs in 2009. Feofan and Nikodim came up with the idea to start a new musical project during their forest walks.

The group's debut album, Drum in the Soul, Bright Rus' in the Heart (Russian: «В душе драм, в сердце светлая Русь»), was released in early 2015. The group toured cities in Russia and Belarus to promote the album. The album was warmly received by listeners and critics and entered the top 10 of Russian iTunes.

Neuromonakh Feofan has performed at Russian music festivals such as Kubana, Nashestvie (Russian: Нашествие), Dikaya Myata (Russian: Дикая Мята, lit. 'Wild Mint'), and VK Fest.

Neuromonakh Feofan was listed as the Russian Independent Performer of the Year on the Yandex Music's 2015 year-end list, based on the streaming service's listening statistics.

== Critical reception ==
Musical critics have noted the novelty of the fusion of Russian folk motifs with electronic dance music in Neuromonakh's music, comparing the project with some legendary Russian performers like MC Vspyshkin and Ivan Kupala.

In an interview, Sergey Shnurov said that Neuromonakh Feofan is “a combination of the incompatible, they are Orthodox atheists, they are believing communists”. Shnurov also approved Neuromonakh Feofan's activities in social networks.

According to The Calvert Journal, Neuromonakh Feofan were part of a 2010s trend in Russian music of combining western electronic sounds with Russian Orthodox and folk musical traditions.

== Discography ==
=== Studio albums ===
- 2015 — Drum in the Soul, Bright Rus' in the Heart (Russian: «В душе драм, в сердце светлая Русь»)
- 2016 — Great Forces of Goodness (Russian: «Велики силы добра»)
- 2017 — To Dance. To Sing (Russian: «Плясать. Петь.»)
- 2022 – Old Russian Rave (Russian: «Древнерусский рейв»)

=== EPs ===
- 2018 — Russian: «Тропа», romanized: Tropa
- 2018 — Russian: «Замиренье», romanized: Zamiren'e)
- 2018 — Russian: «Сияние», romanized: Sijanie
- 2018 — Russian: «Тьма во мне», romanized: T'ma vo mne
- 2019 — Russian: «Ивушка», romanized: Ivushka

=== Singles ===
- 2015 — "To Trample Down"
- 2015 — "Now I Want to Dance!"
- 2016 — "The Hut is Walking with Staggering"
- 2016 — "Old Russian Drum"
- 2017 — "And Now the Bear is Singing"
- 2017 — "Old Russian Soul" (feat. Slot)
- 2018 — "Viski" (feat. Bi-2)

== Videos ==
Year	Title	Director	Album
2015	"To Trample Down" on YouTube	BazavaProduction	Single
2016	"The Hut is Walking with Staggering" on YouTube	Vitaliy Kapitonov	Single
2017	"Drown for Feofan" on YouTube	Vitaliy Kapitonov	"The forces of good are great"
2018	"The Wise Man" on YouTube	Andrey Fenochka	"Reconciliation"
2021	"The new carriage" on YouTube	Anya Ergart	"Drum is in my soul, bright Russia is in my heart"
