= Thomas Watt (cricketer) =

Scottish cricketer

Personal information
- Full name: Thomas Douglas Watt
- Born: 21 December 1891; Edinburgh, Midlothian, Scotland
- Died: 13 June 1949 (aged 57); Edinburgh, Midlothian, Scotland
- Batting: Right-handed
- Bowling: Right-arm medium

Domestic team information
- Years: Team
- 1912–1924: Scotland

Career statistics
Competition	First-class
Matches	11
Runs scored	149
Batting average	10.64
100s/50s	–/–
Top score	23
Balls bowled	1,871
Wickets	21
Bowling average	39.09
5 wickets in innings	–
10 wickets in match	–
Best bowling	3/47
Catches/stumpings	5/–
- Source: Cricinfo, 29 October 2022

Thomas Douglas Watt (21 December 1891 – 13 June 1949) was a Scottish first-class cricketer and cricket administrator.

Watt was born at Edinburgh in December 1891. He was educated at George Watson's College. A club cricketer for Watsonians, he made his debut for Scotland in first-class cricket against Ireland at Dublin in 1912, with Watt making a further appearance against Ireland prior to the First World War. Following the war, he made a further nine first-class appearances, the last of which came in 1924. Playing as a right-arm medium pace bowler, he took 21 wickets at an average of 39.09, with best figures of 3 for 47. As a lower middle order batsman, he scored 149 runs in his eleven matches at an average of 10.64, with a highest score of 23. Watt later served as honorary secretary of the Scottish Cricket Union from 1925 to 1947. A solicitor by profession, he died suddenly at Edinburgh in June 1949.
