= Charles Alexander Malcolm =

Scottish librarian and author

Dr Charles Alexander Malcolm FRSE LLD (1881-11 April 1961) was a Scottish legal librarian and historical author. He was the official librarian to the Signet Library in Edinburgh from 1935.

== Life ==
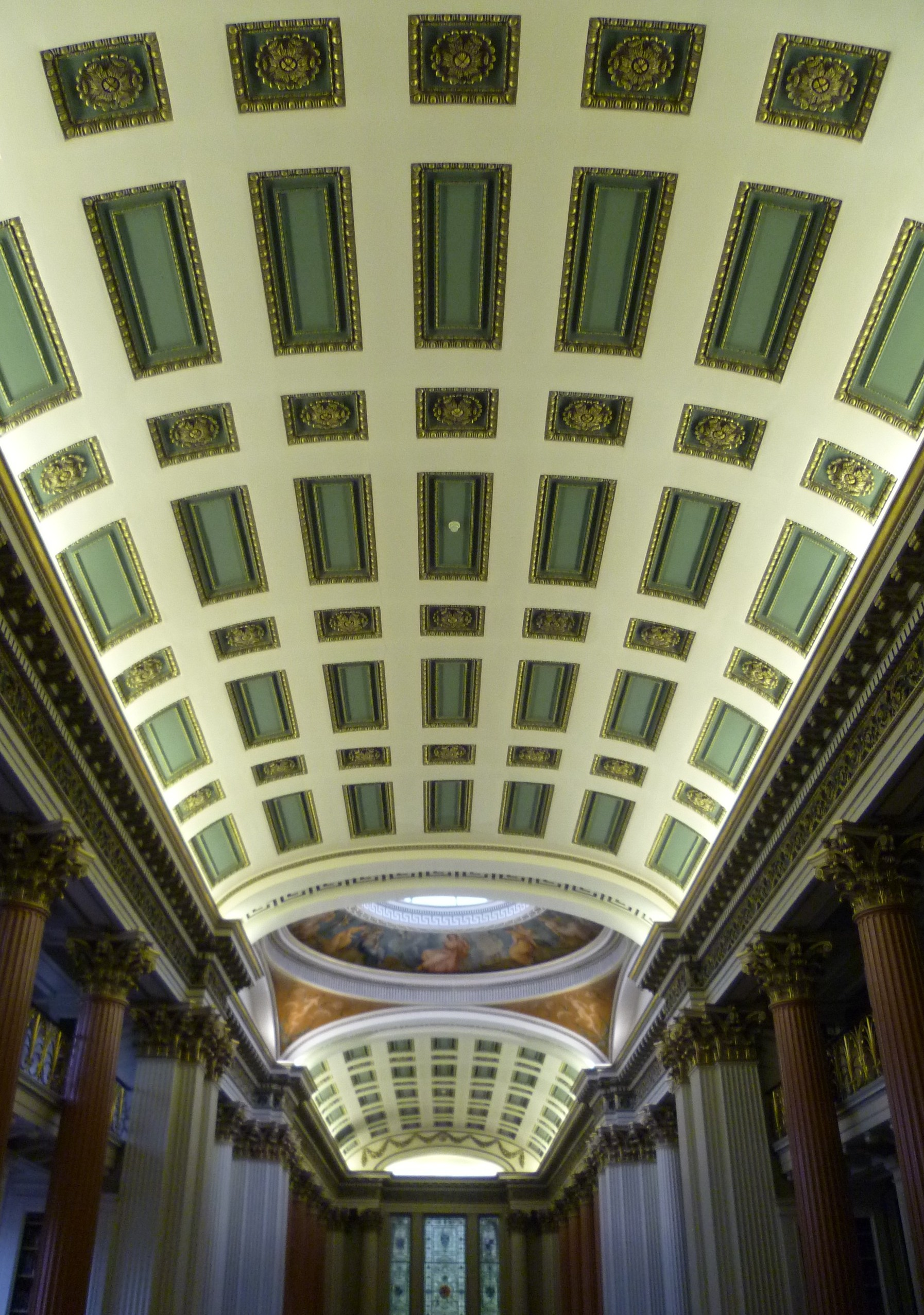
Signet Library ceiling

He was born in Edinburgh in 1881. He was educated at George Watson's College then studied at the University of Edinburgh graduating with an MA. In 1922 he gained a PhD from the University of Edinburgh. From 1900 he was librarian to the Society of Solicitors of the Supreme Courts, and from 1935 oversaw the Signet Library.

In 1938 he was elected a Fellow of the Royal Society of Edinburgh. His proposers were Ernest Wedderburn, James Watt, James Cameron Smail, and Hugh Macmillan, Baron Macmillan. He was awarded the OBE in 1950, he was also awarded an honorary doctorate (LLD) from the University of Glasgow. He was an Honorary Life Member of the Stair Society.

He died in Edinburgh on 11 April 1961. He did not marry and had no children.

== Publications ==
- The Piper in Peace and War
- Holyrood (1937)
- The History of the Bank of Scotland 1695-1945
- The History of the British Linen Bank
