= Slot (band) =

Russian metal band

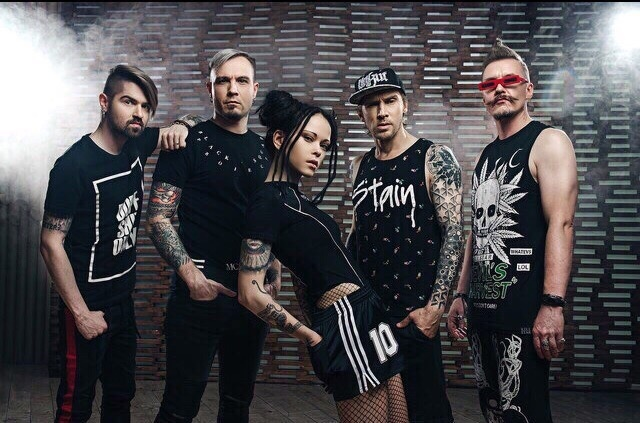

Background information
- Origin: Moscow, Russia
- Genre: Nu metal
- Years active: 2002 - present
- Labels: M2 (formerly M2BA), EM&NEM, Mistery of Sound
- Members: Darya Ravdina (Дарья Равдина); Igor "Cache" Lobanov (Игорь "КЭШ" Лобанов); Sergey "ID" Bogolyubsky (Сергей "ID" Боголюбский); Nikita Muravyov (Никита Муравьёв); Vasily « Ghost » Gorshkov
- Past members: Denis "Dan" Khromykh (Денис "Дэн" Хромых); Alexey "Proff" Nazarchuk (Алексей "Proff" Назарчук); Teona "Teka" Dolnikova (Теона "Тека" Дольникова); Uliana "IF" Elina (Ульяна "IF" Елина); Daria "Nookie" Stavrovich (Дария "Нуки" Ставрович); Mikhail "mikhei4" Korolev (Михаил "muxeu4" Королёв); Mikhail "MiX" Petrov (Михаил "MiX" Петров); Nikita "NiXoN" Simonov (Никита "NiXoN" Симонов); Kirill "Mr Dudu/The Dude" Kachanov (Кирилл "Mr Dudu/The Dude" Качанов)
- Website: http://www.slot.ru

Slot (Russian: Слот) is a Russian nu metal band consisting of members Darya Ravdina, Igor "Cache" Lobanov, Sergey "ID" Bogolyubsky, Nikita Muravyov, and Vasiliy "Ghost" Gorshkov. Since its inception, the group has produced eight studio albums, two remix albums, two mini-albums, and two live DVDs, in addition to recording 20 singles and contributing to various soundtracks.

== Biography ==
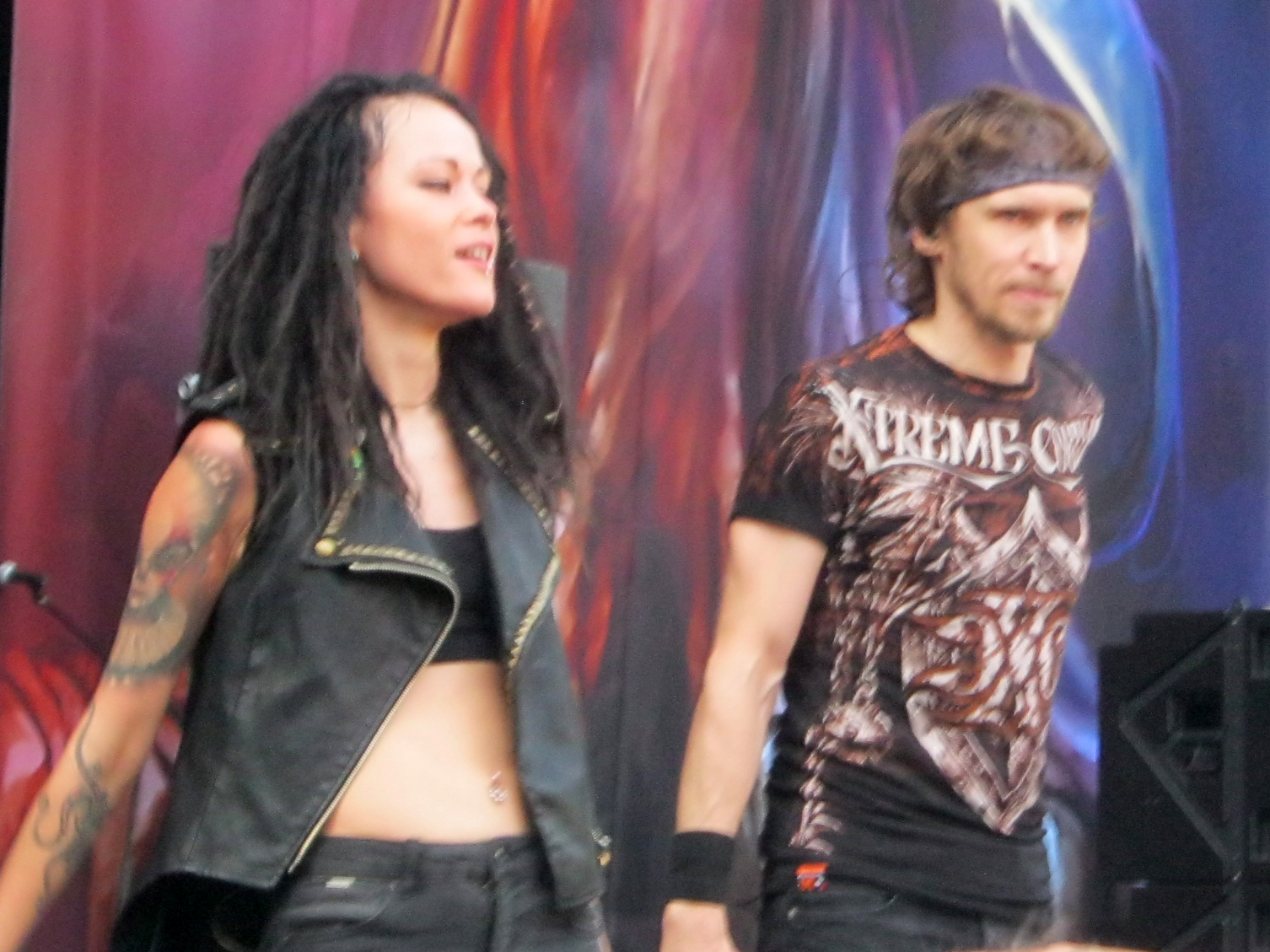
"Nookie" and "Cache", at Ariafest 2016

Slot was founded by vocalist and chief songwriter Igor Lobanov, known as Cache, and Denis Khromykh, known as "Dan," in 2002 in Moscow, Russia. In 2003, they debuted with their album "SLOT 1," which was released under the Mistery Of Sound recording label.

In the summer of 2006, Slot established their presence on Myspace. In autumn 2006, the band released their second studio album titled "2 Wars" (2 войны). On September 19, 2009, Slot released their fourth studio album.

In 2011, Slot released "Break the Code," their debut English album, on August 23rd. Additionally, a special edition of the album was released in Japan.

In early 2014, Slot released the crowd-funded album "Шестой" ("Sixth"). On April 18, 2014, during an autograph session with fans at a café in St. Petersburg, Nookie was stabbed multiple times in her neck. She was promptly taken to the hospital, where doctors described her condition as "moderately serious," but her life was not at risk.

On April 4, 2024, Daria "Nookie" Stavrovich announced her departure from the band after 18 years.

On July 25th, 2024, it was revealed that the new female vocalist to replace Daria Stavrovich is the metal singer Darya Ravdina.

On August 20, 2026, Lobanov and Ravdina announced that Ravdina would part ways with the band after the remaining scheduled shows were completed.

== Achievements ==
The group's vocalist, Daria Stavrovich, gained recognition as a semifinalist on the popular Russian television show "The Voice." Her rendition of the song "Zombie" by The Cranberries has garnered over 33 million views on YouTube.

== Band members ==
Current members

- Darya Ravdina - vocals (2024-present)
- Igor "Cache" Lobanov - vocals (2002-present)
- Sergey "ID" Bogolyubsky- guitar (2002-present)
- Nikita Muravyov - bass guitar (2014-present)
- Vasilij "Ghost" Gorshkov - drums, percussion (2016-present)

Former members

- Daria "Nookie" Stavrovich - vocals (2007-2024)
- Denis "Dan" Chromyk - bass (2002-2003), guitars (2004)
- Alexsej "Proff" Nazachuk - drums (2002-2004)
- Teona "Teka" Dolnikova - vocals (2002-2004)
- Uljana "IF" Elina - vocals (2005-2006)
- Mikhail "mikhei4" Korolev - bass (2005-2006)
- Mikhail "MiX" Petrov - bass (2007)
- Nikita "NiXon" Simonov - bass (2009-2013)
- Kirill "Mr. Dude" Kachanov - drums (2005-2015)

== Discography ==
=== Studio albums ===
Year	Name	Label
2003	SLOT1	M2BA
2006	2Wars( 2 войны)	EM&NEM
2007	Trinity (Тринити)	M2BA
2009	4ever	M2BA
2010	The Best Of...	
2011	Break The Code	M2BA
2011	F5	M2BA
2013	Sixth (Шестой)	M2BA
2016	Septima	M2BA
2019	200 kW	M2BA
2021	Survival instinct	M2BA
2025	x10	M2BA

=== Re-released albums ===
Year	Name	Label
2007	2Wars (with Nookie on vocals)	
2010	The Best Of...	
2016	2Wars (10th Anniversary Edition)	
2017	Slot 15	M2BA

=== Remixes ===
Year	Name	Label
2008	kiSLOTa. The First Drop (киСЛОТа. Первая капля)	
2010	kiSLOTa 2 (киСЛОТа 2, with Johnny Beast)	

=== Singles ===
Year	Name	Label
2003	Alone (Одни)	
2006	Two Wars (2 войны)	
2007	Dead Stars (Мёртвые Звёзды)	
2007	Trinity (Тринити)	
2008	They Killed Kenny (Они убили Кенни)	
2009	Alfa Romeo + Betta Joliette (Alfa-Ромео + Beta-Джульетта)	
2009	My Angel (АнгелОК)	
2009	A.N.I.M.E. (А. Н. И. М. Е.)	
2010	Board (Доска)	
2010	Mirrors (Зеркала) - first single released simultaneously in both Russian and English	
2010	Lego (Лего)	
2011	Kill Me Baby One More Time	
2011	Twilight (Сумерки)	
2013	If (Если)	
2013	Knee-Deep (Поколено)	
2014	Glass Of Revolution (Стёкла Революции)	
2015	Attractive Force (Сила Притяжения)	
2015	Kills As Wants! (Мочит как хочет!)	
2015	Fear And Aggression (Страх и агрессия)	
2016	Circles on the Water (Круги на воде)	
2017	Old Russian Soul (Древнерусская душа, with Neuromonakh Feofan)	
2018	To Mars! (На Марс!)	
2018	Cuckoo (Кукушка)	
2019	Moscow (Москва)	

=== DVD ===
Year	Name
2008	Live&Video (Concert within the limits of "Triniti-round" in TELE-club Yekaterinburg + the collection of video clips)
2017	#REDLIVE

== Videography ==
Year	Name
2003	Alone (Одни)
2006	Two Wars (2 Войны)
2007	Dead Stars (Мёртвые Звёзды)
2008	They Killed Kenny (Они убили Кенни)
2009	Angel O.K. (Ангел О.К.)
2010	The Board (Доска)
2010	Mirrors (Зеркала)
2010	Lego (Лего)
2010	Alone
2011	Kill Me Baby One More Time
2011	Twilight (Сумерки)
2012	Lonely People (Одинокие Люди)
2013	Angel Or Demon (Ангел Или Демон)
2013	If (Если)
2014	Just A Man (Просточеловек)
2014	FIGHT! (БОЙ!)
2015	Kills As Wants! (Мочит Как Хочет!)
2016	Circles on the Water (Круги На Воде)
2018	To Mars! (На Марс!)
2019	HLS (ЗОЖ)
2019	Moscow (Москва) Lyric Video

== OST and compilations ==
- 2003 OST "Bumer"
- 2003 Compilation "Nashestvie XIV"
- 2004 Compilation "SCANG FEST 3"
- 2004 Compilation "Rock Maraphon"
- 2005 Compilation "RAMP 2005"
- 2006 OST "Piranha"
- 2006 Compilation "Russian Alternative" 2006
- 2007 OST "Shadowboxing 2: Revenge"
- 2007 OST "Half-Life: Paranoia" (Half-Life's modification)
- 2008 OST "Street Racers"
- 2008 OST "Black Hunters"
- 2011 OST "Shadowboxing 3: Last Round
- 2014 OST "Angel or Demon"
- 2014 OST "Ownership 18"

== Awards ==
- RAMP Awards 2005 - Best Vocal of the Year (won with female vocalist Uliana "IF" Elina)
- RAMP Awards 2006 - Hit of the Year (Won), Album of the year, Band of the year (Nominated)
- RAMP Awards 2007 - Band of the Year (Nominated)
- RAMP Awards 2008 - Clip of the Year (Nominated), Album of the Year (Nominated), Hit of the Year (Nominated), Soundtrack of the Year (Nominated), Band of the Year (Nominated)
