= John Alexander Loraine =

Scottish physician and endocrinologist

John Alexander Loraine FRSE FRCPE FIB (14 May 1924 – 14 November 1988) was a Scottish physician and endocrinologist. He wrote widely on human sexuality.

== Life ==
Loraine was born in Edinburgh on 14 May 1924, the son of Ruth (née Jack) and Lachlan Dempster Loraine. He was educated at George Watson's College then studied medicine at the University of Edinburgh, graduating with an MB ChB. In 1946 he was awarded the Thomson Memorial Medal in Child Life and Health for his essay on “Certain common diseases of childhood in relation to their social background”. He did further postgraduate studies, specialising in sexuality and endocrinology and gained both a PhD and DSc. For the degree of DSc he submitted his previously published work, The clinical application of hormone assay.

In 1947 he joined the staff of the Clinical Endocrinology Research Unit. He was promoted to assistant director in 1958 and director in 1961. In 1972 he joined the staff of the University of Edinburgh lecturing in community medicine. In 1978 he was elected a fellow of the Royal Society of Edinburgh. His proposers were Anne McLaren, Roger Valentine Short, Aubrey Manning, Douglas Scott Falconer and H. John Evans.

He married Alison Blair in 1974.

He died in Edinburgh on 14 November 1988.

== Publications ==
- The clinical application of hormone assay (1958)
- Fertility and Contraception in the Human Female (1968)
- Sex and the Population Crisis (1971)
- The Death of Tomorrow (1972)
- Understanding Homosexuality (1974)
- Syndromes of the 70s (1977)
- Global Signposts to the 21st Century (1979)
