= George Watson (accountant) =

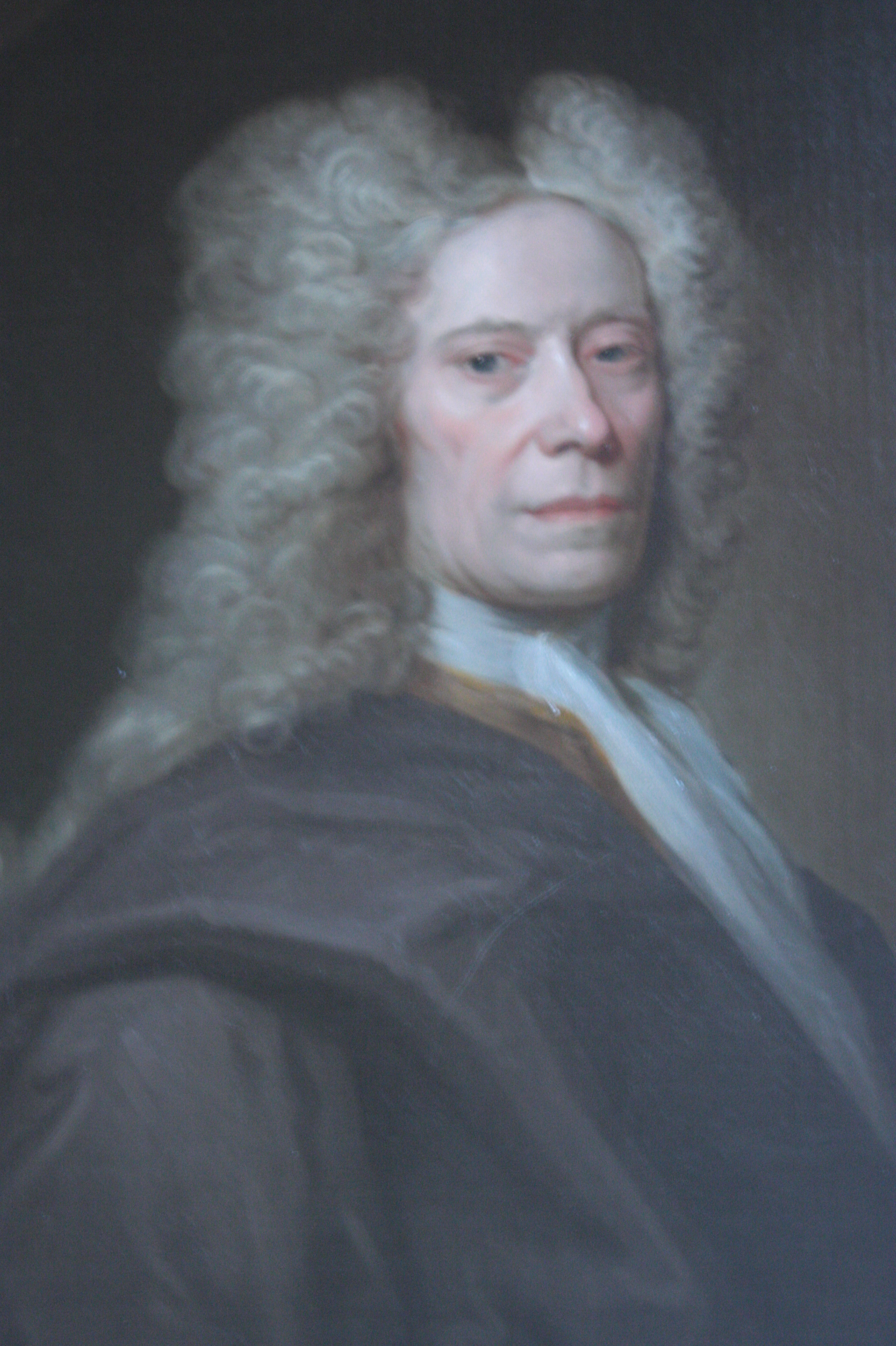
- A portrait of Watson by William Aikman
- Born: November 23, 1654; Edinburgh, Scotland
- Died: April 3, 1723 (aged 68)
- Resting place: Greyfriars Kirkyard, Edinburgh, Scotland
- Occupations: Accountant; Philanthropist
- Known for: Founding George Watson's College; First Chief Accountant for the Bank of Scotland

George Watson (23 November 1654 – 3 April 1723) was a Scottish accountant and philanthropist. He was the Bank of Scotland's first Chief Accountant. He bequeathed money that was used to establish George Watson's College and fund George Heriot's School.

== Life ==
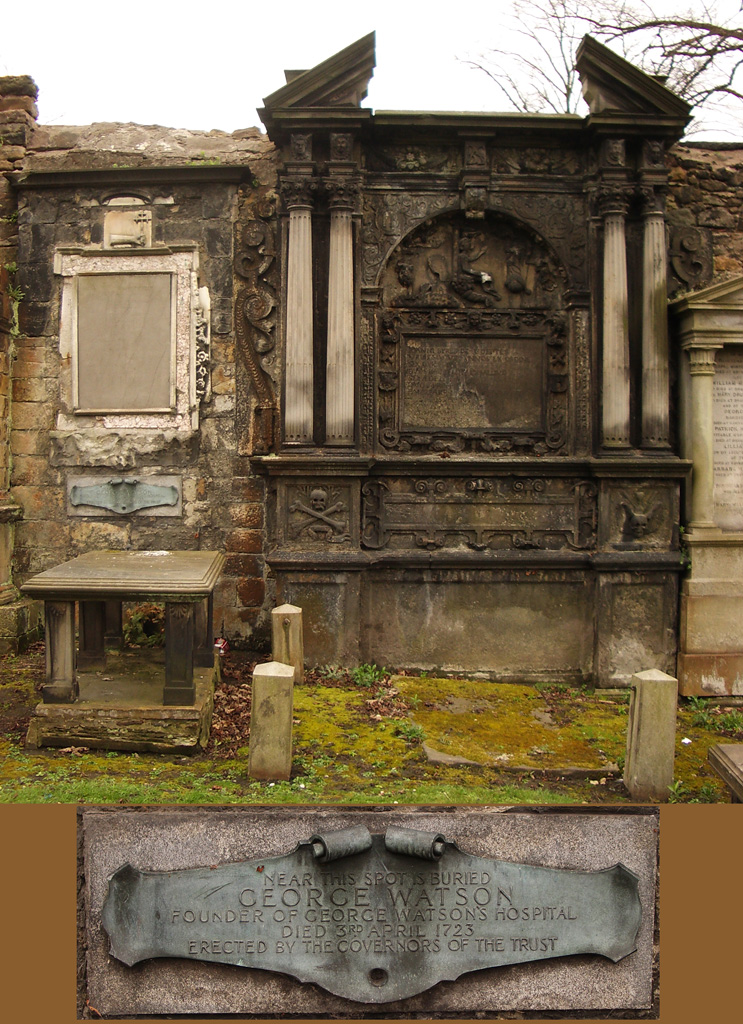
Watson's memorial shown in situ with – inset – a close-up to allow the wording to be read. (Click the image to load large version.)

Watson was born in Edinburgh on 12 November 1654, the eldest son of Marion Ewing (d.1697) and John Watson, a merchant. After the death of his father and the remarriage of his mother, Watson and his brother James were brought up by their aunt Elizabeth Davidson. In 1672, he went to Rotterdam to be educated in book-keeping. He returned to Edinburgh to become, in 1676, the private secretary to Sir James Dick. Based partly on this experience he became one of Scotland's most famed accountants of his time, and was appointed chief accountant to the Bank of Scotland when it was founded in 1695.

George Watson was buried in Edinburgh's Greyfriars Kirkyard, and although the precise location of his remains is unknown, there is a memorial plaque in a wall in the north-west of the graveyard.

== Investment in the Transatlantic Slave Trade ==
Letters held by the Edinburgh City Archives written in 1695-6 between George Watson and two Scottish merchants residing in London, James Pitcairn and Michael Kincaid, show an intent for a mercantile venture to procure a ship and transport slaves from West Africa to Barbados and return to the British Isles carrying sugar. George Watson invested in this ship, named the Amity and captained by John Duncan. This venture was to be undertaken in conditions of secrecy as Scots were not allowed to trade with English colonies before the Act of Union in 1707.

Colonial Office records held by the National Archives in Kew show that between 1698 and 1700, Duncan’s Amity sailed between Plymouth, Maio (Cape Verde), Barbados and Maryland three times. While the imports sections for the Amity within these records are either blank, damaged or illegible, it can be reasonably inferred that, given the conditions of secrecy and the sailing of the Middle Passage by the ship, this venture carried out the plan set out in the initial letters between Watson, Pitcairn, and Kincaid.

Arms of George Watson

== Educational benefactions ==
Having been an early benefactor of Edinburgh's Merchant Maiden Hospital, Watson subsequently bequeathed in his will a generous sum for the Merchant Company of Edinburgh, with specific sums being set aside for educating pupils at the Merchant Maiden Hospital, the Trades Maiden Hospital and Heriot's Hospital, now George Heriot's School. He stipulated that all his beneficiaries were to bear the name Watson or Davidson - this was not an unusual style of stipulation at the time; another example being Edinburgh's Donaldson's Hospital where bursaries were made available to children bearing the name of Donaldson.

A further £144,000 Pound Scots was left for the foundation of a new charitable school, or "hospital" as they were then known, for "entertaining and educating the male children and grandchildren of decayed merchants in Edinburgh". This was to become George Watson's College. George Watson's College continues to be a successful Edinburgh school and has undertaken a programme of research and reflection about how it should acknowledge the involvement of its original benefactor in the slave trade. One change was the traditional annual "Founder’s Day" being renamed to "Foundation Day" in 2023 with a focus on the positive inclusive values of the school today.

== In Literature ==
George Watson features as one of the two ghosts in Robert Fergusson's poem The Ghaists: A Kirk-Yard Eclogue (1773).
