= Paul Nuki =

British journalist and editor

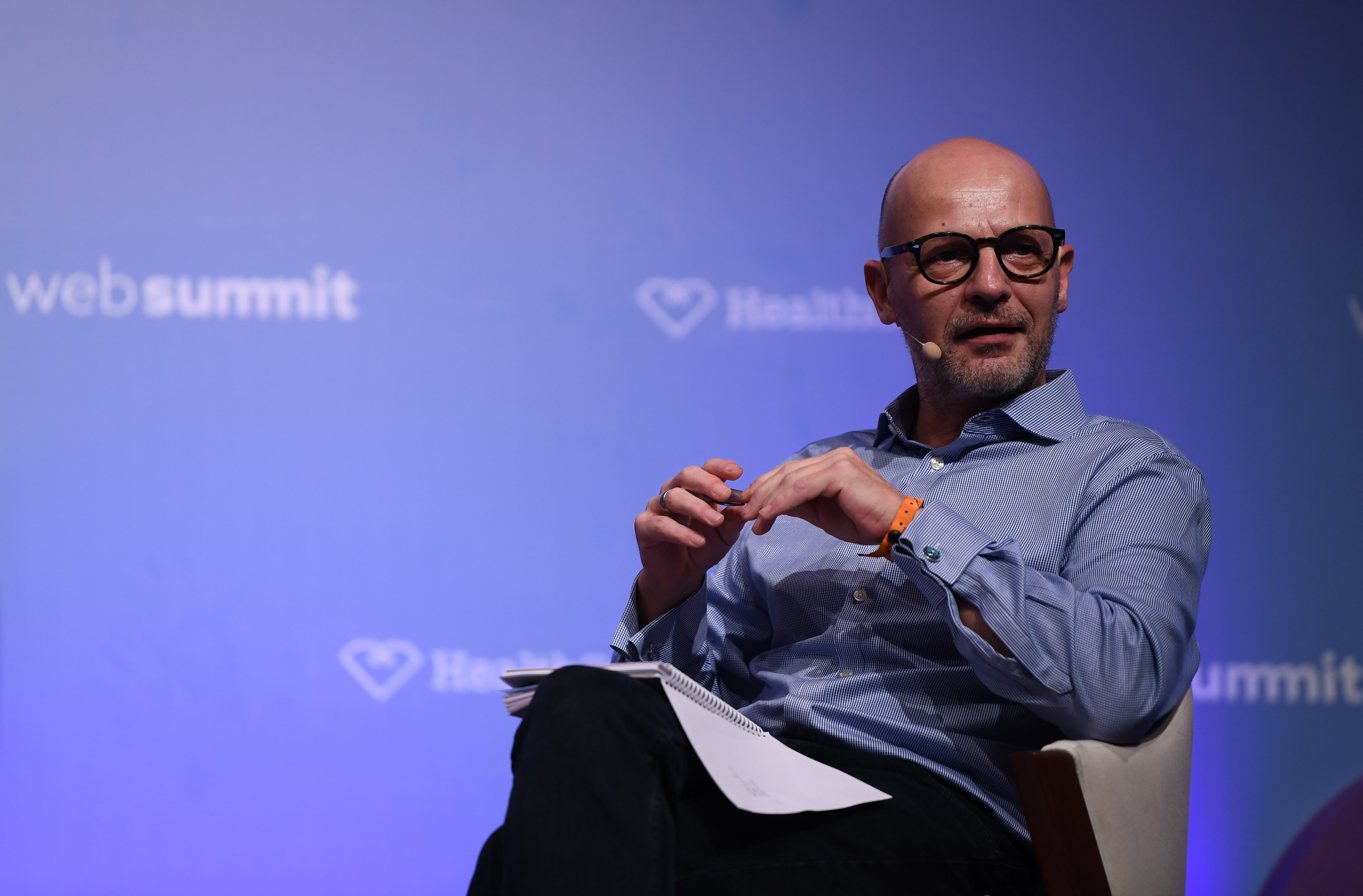
- Born: 3 July 1964 (age 62)
- Education: University of Liverpool
- Occupations: Journalist and editor

Paul Nuki is a senior British journalist and editor. He is currently Global Health Security Editor at The Telegraph newspaper, London.

In previous posts, Nuki was Focus editor, deputy news editor, money editor, personal finance editor, consumer affairs editor, deputy Insight editor and reporter at The Sunday Times, which he joined in 1993. In May 2007, he left The Sunday Times to become the founding chief editor of NHS Choices, the web portal of the UK National Health Service. He was also co-founder and CEO of Stepjockey, a London-based digital health business that promotes stair use.

Nuki was educated at George Watson's College, a private school in Edinburgh, and later the University of Liverpool (1983–1986). He is the son of Professor George Nuki of the University of Edinburgh.
