= Leslie Craig (cricketer) =

Scottish cricketer and physician

Personal information
- Full name: Leslie Craig
- Born: 14 October 1904; Edinburgh, Midlothian, Scotland
- Died: 3 October 1971 (aged 66); Willington Quay, Northumberland, England
- Batting: Unknown
- Role: Wicket-keeper

Domestic team information
- Years: Team
- 1928–1929: Scotland

Career statistics
Competition	First-class
Matches	2
Runs scored	30
Batting average	10.00
100s/50s	–/–
Top score	17
Catches/stumpings	4/1
- Source: Cricinfo, 26 July 2022

Leslie Craig (14 October 1904 – 3 October 1971) was a Scottish first-class cricketer and medical doctor.

Craig was born at Edinburgh in October 1904. He was educated at George Watson's College, before matriculating to study medicine at both the University of Edinburgh and the University of Glasgow. A club cricketer for Watsonians Cricket Club, he made two appearances for Scotland in first-class cricket against Ireland, in 1928 at Edinburgh and 1929 at Dublin. Playing as a wicket-keeper in the Scottish team, he took four catches and made a single stumping in his two matches, in addition to scoring 30 runs. As a medical practitioner, Craig spent 40 years in England as a general practitioner in Tyneside. He died in October 1971 at Willington Quay, Northumberland; he was unmarried and had no children.
