= Daria Stavrovich =

Russian singer-songwriter (born 1986)

Daria "NUKI" Sergeevna Stavrovich Дария "НУКИ" Сергеевна Ставрович
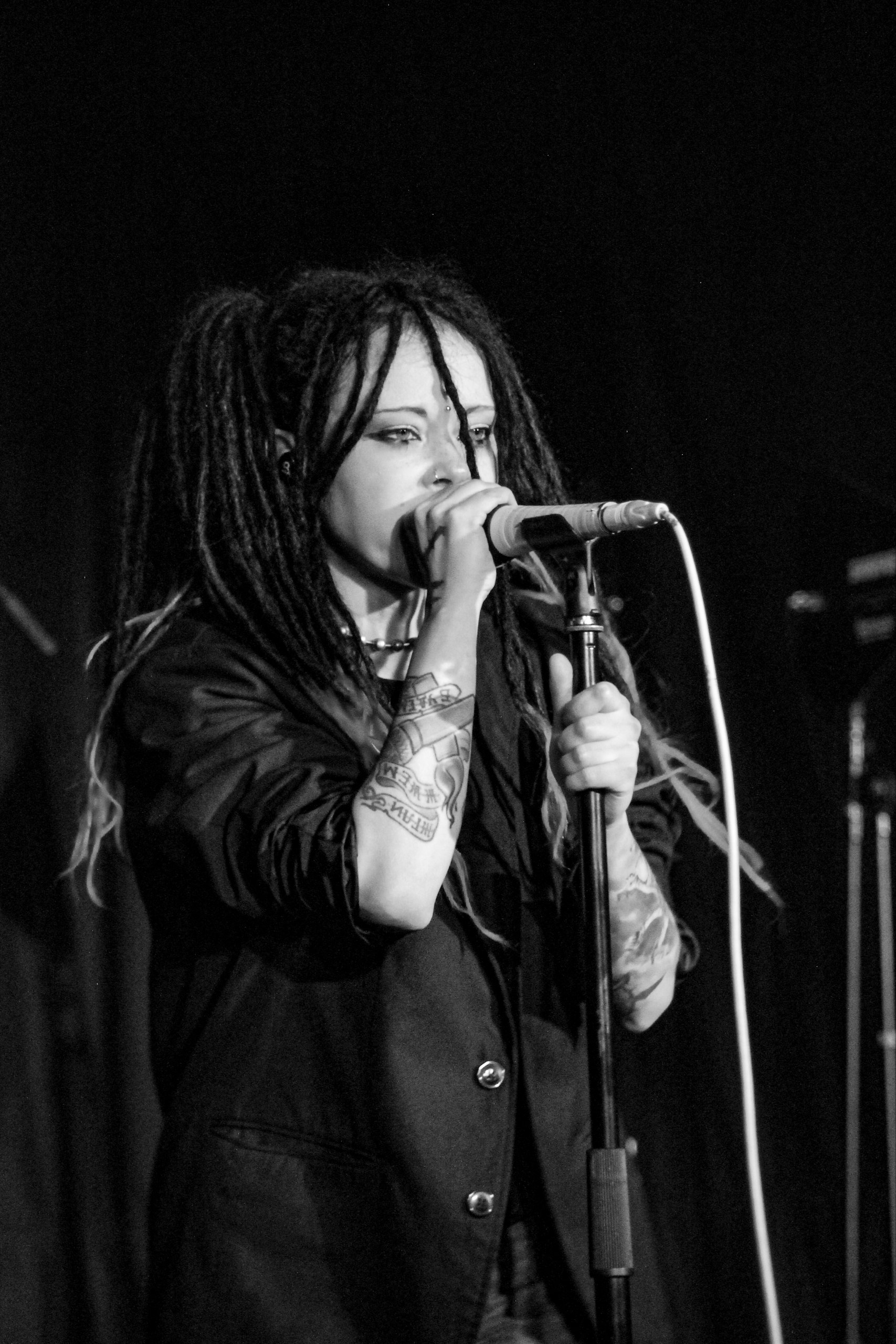
- Daria performing in Riga.

Background information
- Also known as: Nuki, Нуки
- Born: Daria Sergeevna Stavrovich; February 1, 1986 (age 40); Velsk, Arkhangelsk Oblast, RSFSR, Soviet Union
- Genres: Rock; Art rock; Alternative rock; Nu metal
- Occupations: singer; musician; songwriter; composer
- Instruments: Piano; Guitar
- Years active: 2006–present
- Label: M2BA
- Member of: NUKI-Formation
- Formerly of: Slot
- Website: nukiband.com

Daria Sergeevna Stavrovich (Russian: Дария Сергеевна Ставрович), also known as Nuki (Russian: Нуки; transliteration of her first pseudonym Nookie) (born February 1, 1986 Velsk, Arkhangelsk Oblast), is a Russian singer-songwriter and composer. From 2006 to 2024, she was the vocalist, lyricist and co-frontwoman of the alternative rock band Slot (Russian: Слот), participating in the recording of nine studio albums. Since 2013, she has been the vocalist of her own ongoing project "Nuki Formation", and has released five studio albums. In 2016, she became a semi-finalist in the fifth season of the Russian version of The Voice. In 2024, she left Slot due to political disagreements with the members of the group and is now focusing on her Nuki project.

== Biography and career ==
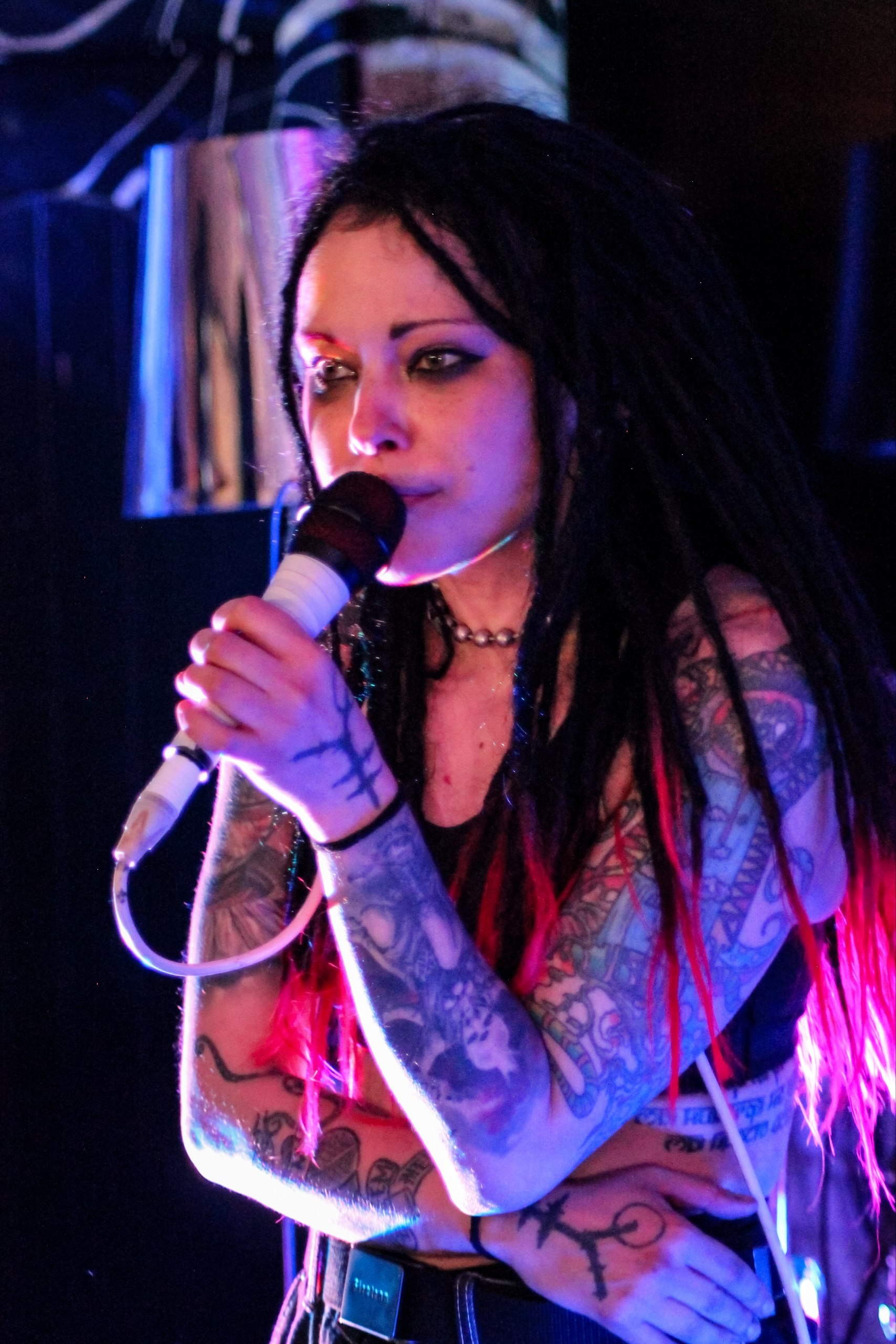
Daria Stavrovich on Vilnius at 2026.

Daria Sergeevna Stavrovich was born on February 1, 1986, at Velsk, Arkhangelsk Oblast. Her father is a surgeon and her mother has a musical education. After graduating from school in Arzamas, she studied at the Nizhny Novgorod College of Music. In 2006, Stavrovich joined the alternative rock band Slot. She combined her work in the band with her studies in classical and pop-jazz singing at the Institute of Contemporary Art. As a member of the band, she participated in the recording of nine studio albums, including the reissue of the album 2 войны (2 Wars), on which she sang.

Since 2013, she has participated in Kirill Nemolyaev's international music project "Forces United", for which she recorded nine songs. "Forces United" also featured Maksim Samosvat, Konstantin Seleznev, Petr Elfimov, Dmitri Skidanenko, Jevgeni Jegorov, Jarkko Ahola and several other well-known musicians.

In 2014, she received the Golden Note award for "Best Rock Song" from the Igor Sandler Production Center. She also came second in the NewsMuz portal's vote for "Best Female Performer".

On September 30, 2016, Channel One aired the "blind audition" episode of the fifth season of The Voice, in which Stavrovich performed the song "Zombie" by Irish rock band The Cranberries. She qualified for the show, ended up on Grigori Leps' team, and eventually became a semi-finalist.

In 2019, Daria supported protests by other Arkhangelsk residents and spoke out against the construction of a landfill at the Shies station in the Arkhangelsk region.

In 2020, Daria Stavrovich won the XIII Chartova Dyuzhina Prize in the soloist category.

=== Departure from the Slot group ===
At the beginning of 2024, Slot was blacklisted as performers in Russia began to face the problem of concert cancellations.

Stavrovich announced her departure from Slot on April 4, 2024. The official reason for her departure was "to pursue a solo career".

A year after leaving Slot, she gave an interview to Ganz Music School, where she detailed the real reasons for her departure. Slot was added to the list of banned artists, "blacklist", which gave band members the opportunity to reconsider their anti-war stance. In order to return to concerts, the members decided to "fulfill the conditions of the presidential administration" to lift the restrictions – first they performed in an orphanage, and then for soldiers at Zaporizhzhia. At this point, the band had already replaced Nuki with another singer, Darya Ravdina.

Stavrovich refused to participate even for the first stage to lift the restrictions. For her, the band was not just a cultural project or a commercial enterprise, but an important part of her own identity. Nuki tried to present arguments against participation and offered alternative solutions for the band's development, but the members did not accept her proposals.

Therefore, despite giving the band 18 years of her life, she refused to become part of the system and was forced to make a decision to leave the group.

After that, it was reported that Nikita Muravyov and Serhiy Bogolyubsky, who also played in the band Slot, had left from Daria's band Nuki.

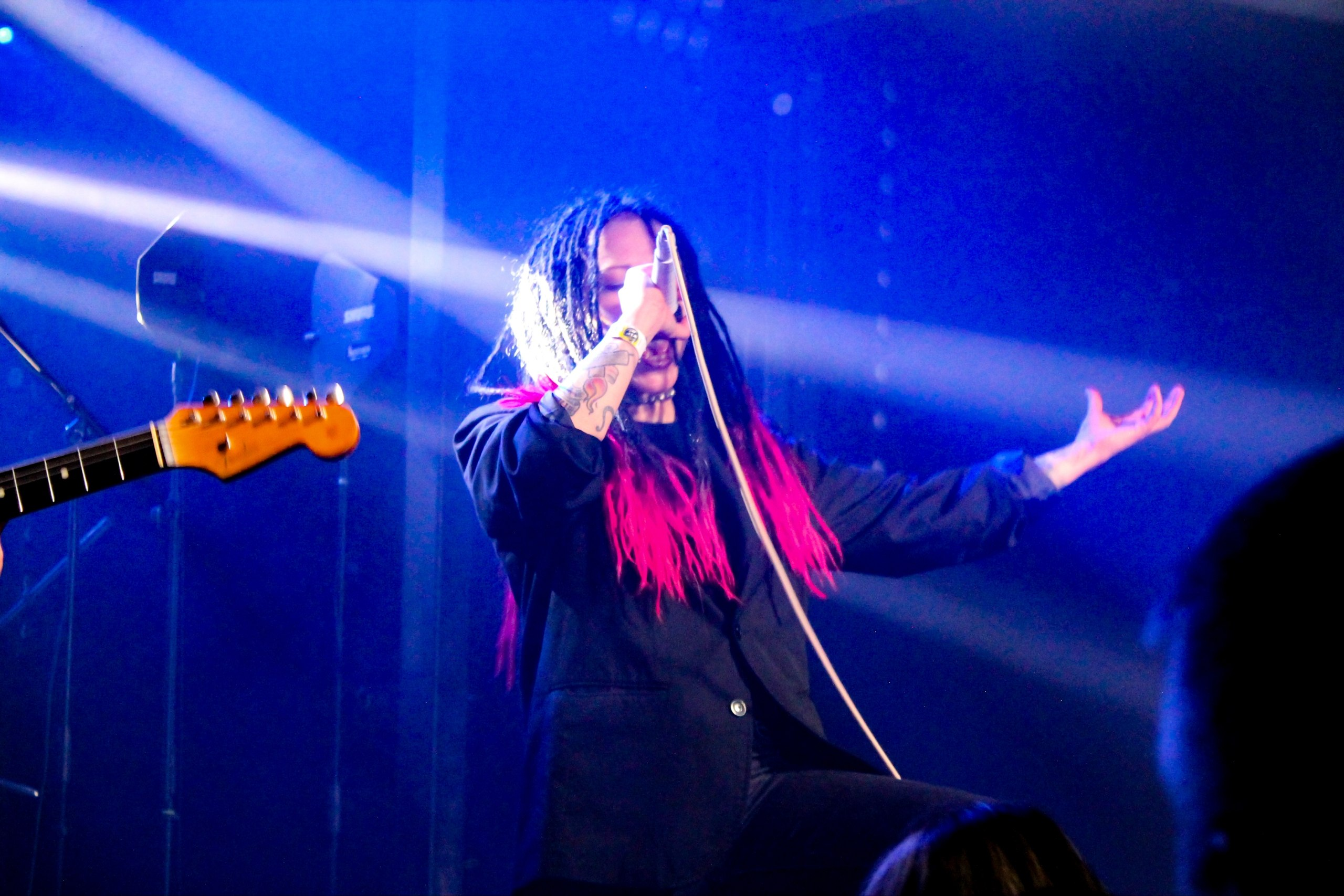
Nuki Formation on tour at Estonia, Tallinn 2026.

=== Nuki formation ===
In 2012, Daria Stavrovich started a solo project, which she named "Nuki Formation". The official founding date of the band is considered to be April 29, 2013. – on the same day their first studio album Живы! (Alive!) was released. Music videos were filmed for the songs "Живы!", "Научи" (Teach) and "Бойся" (Fear) from the album.

The band's permanent lineup was formed, which included, in addition to Daria, guitarist Sergei "ID" Bogolyubsky, bassist Andrey Ostrav, and drummer Aleksandr Karpukhin This lineup recorded and released their second studio album, Пыльца лунной бабочки (Pollen of the Moon Butterfly), on May 19, 2015. Music videos were filmed for the songs "Иллюзия" (Illusion) and "Реальность" (Reality), which were included on the album.

On March 23, 2016, the single "Танцуй, клоун, танцуй" (Dance, Clown, Dance) and two songs from the first album, "Пепел" (Ashes) and "Живы!" (Alive!), were released in new versions (Amanita Version).

In 2017, the band released their third studio album, Исключения (Exceptions), which included the singles "Танцуй, клоун, танцуй" and "Мыпростоесть" (We Just Are). Music videos were also filmed for the songs "Мыпростоесть" and "Продолжаем движение" (Continue Moving) from the album.

In 2019, bassist Andrey Ostravin was replaced by Nikita Muravyov.

The band's fourth studio album, Волки смотрят в лес (Wolves Look at the Forest), was released on January 31, 2020. Music videos were shot for the songs "Страна" (Country) and "Пищевая цепочка" (Food Chain). The song "Вороны" (Crows) from the album was played on Nashe Radio for the first time in the project's history, and the album itself won the album category at the 14th Chartova Dyuzhina Awards.

On July 22, 2020, an acoustic concert was broadcast live on the project's YouTube channel, later released as "Acoustics (Live)".

On September 2, 2022, the compilation 10 лет (10 Years) was released, which, in addition to the band's best songs in the opinion of listeners, included the new song "Измерения" (Dimensions).

On October 8, 2022, the project's 10th anniversary concert was held at the URBAN club in Moscow. The recording of this concert formed the basis for the release of 10 лет в космосе (10 Years in Space) in 2023.

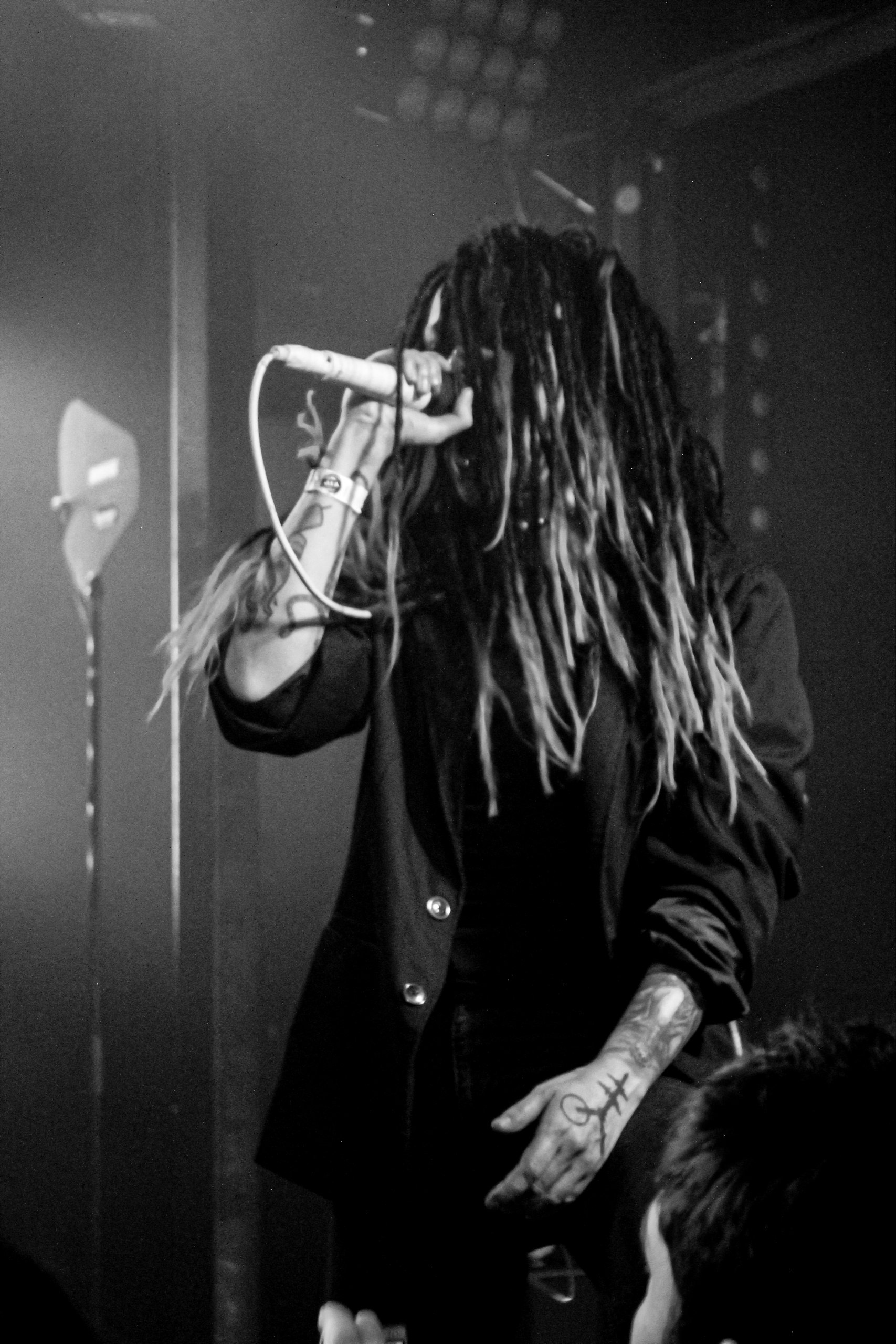
Daria "Nuki" Stavrovich at Tallinn on 2026.

In 2023, the Nuki Formation won the XVI Chart Dozen Award in the side project category.

On April 4, 2024, a message appeared on the Slot's official website stating that Daria had decided to leave the group.

On April 5, 2024, a day after Daria Stavrovich's departure from Slot was announced, it was announced that the Nuki Project would continue its activities without Nikita Muravyov and Sergei "ID" Bogolyubsky.

In May, while streaming on Boosty, Daria Stavrovich announced the release date of the band's new single – June 14, 2024. Name of the single was "Саботаж" (Sabotage). The song "Саботаж" entered the charts of Nashe Radio and Komsomolskaya Pravda. After eight weeks on the charts, the song reached number one.

Viktor Kucher was introduced as the band's new guitarist, who had previously collaborated with the band on the album Волки смотрят в лес (song "Деньги" [Money]), Acoustics (Live), and the Исключения (Exceptions) -tour.

In June 2024, Daria Stavrovich announced in an interview with Komsomolskaya Pravda radio the future plans of the Nuki Formation – the release of the second single in August and the third in October, followed by the release of a new album.

On July 25, 2024, a crowdfunding campaign launched on Planeta.ru -website to record a new album. The fundraising goal of 2,000,000 ₽ was reached in two days and 10 hours.

The second single from the new album by Nuki Formation, the ballad "Спичка" (Match), was released on August 9, 2024. A music video was also filmed for the song.

In September 2024, it was announced via Boosty.to streaming that the third and final single would be released on October 18, ahead of the new album. The song was titled "Не Нужны" (Not Needed).

The band's fifth studio album Терапия (Therapy) was released on November 22, 2024. The music for all songs was composed by the creative duo Stavrovich and Kucher. Session musician Dmitri Simonov played bass on the album. Before the release, Daria visited the studio of the "Propunk" program on "Nashe Radio", where the radio premiere of the song "Зомби зомби" (Zombie Zombie) was aired.

On December 20, the music video for the song "Не Нужны" (Not Needed) was released on YouTube. In a stream published on the Boosty service, Daria Stavrovich praised the video as the best of the videos she had filmed in her career. The video's visual artist and director was Alina Brazhnikova.

The radio premiere of the song "Миллионы" (Millions) was on February 7 as part of the "Chartova Dyuzhina" hit parade on "Nashe Radio".

In March 2025, the singer released the mini-album Акустика на случай зомби-апокалипсиса. Ч.1 (Acoustics for the Zombie Apocalypse. Part 1), which included five songs from the album Терапия in acoustic arrangements.

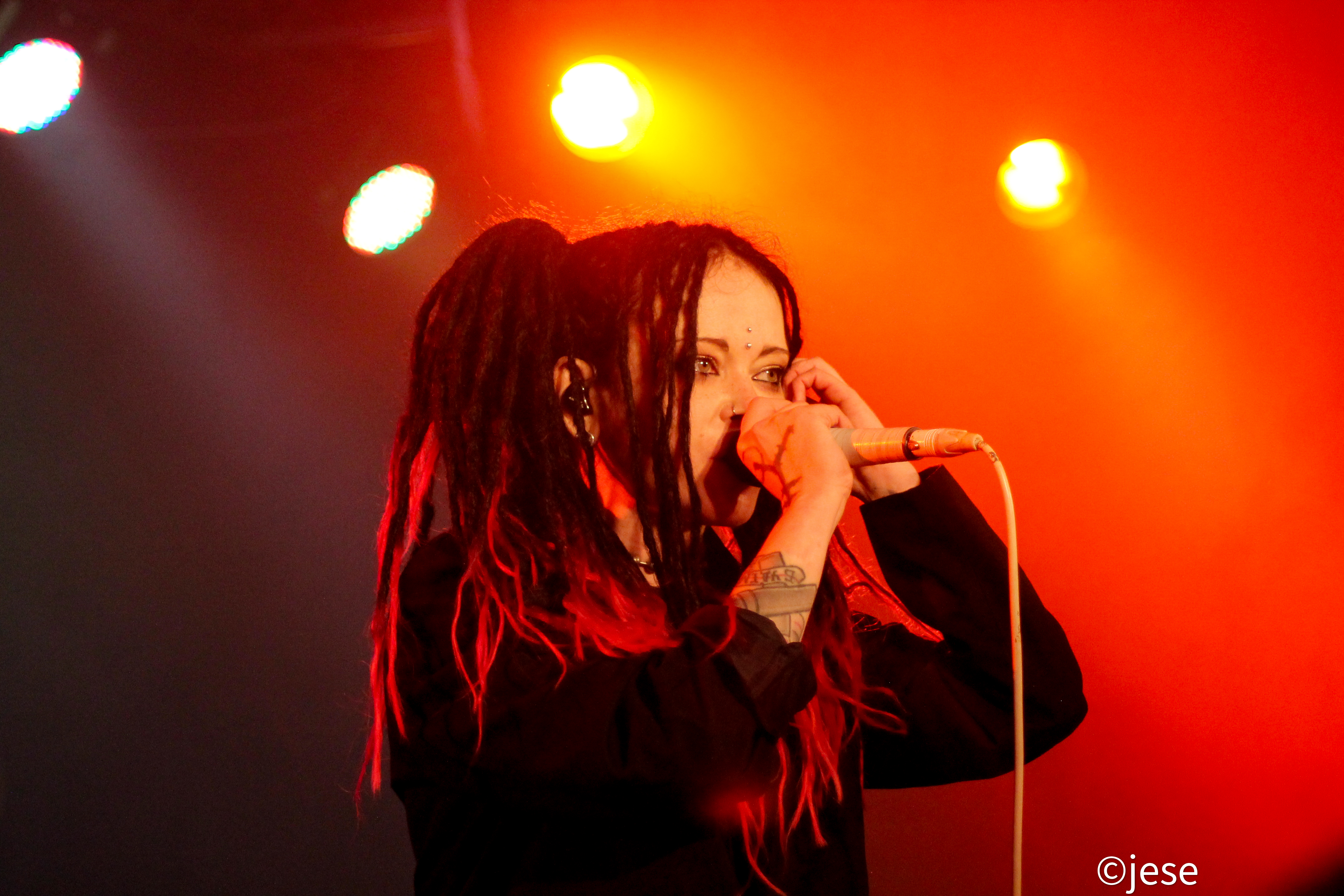
Nuki performing at Latvia, Riga 2026.

In the fall of 2025, the Nuki Formation made a tour of Central Asia to celebrate their latest album and to perform it finally in the stage. (Не Нужны Тур).

In the spring of 2026, the Nuki Formation went on to European tour (Ne Nuzhny Tour), which included countries like France, Germany, Poland, Estonia, Latvia, Lithuania, Spain, Serbia and Moldova.

On the August 10.2026, the Nuki Formation published crowd funding campaign to record their sixth studio album.

=== Other projects ===
In addition to playing in rock bands, Stavrovich has composed music for several television and theater projects. Together with Sergei "ID" Bogolyubsky, they composed the music for the opening and closing ceremonies of the 2019 Winter Universiade. Theater projects include All About Cinderella (Musical Theater, with Raimonds Pauls), Blue Bluebird (Theater of Nations) and Charles Adams aka The House of the Seven Hanged (Pjotr Fomenko Workshop). The creative duo Stavrovich-Bogolyubsky have also composed (and Daria is a performer of some) songs for cartoons, including Ми-ми-мишки, Сказочный патруль, Бумажки, Волшебный фонарь, Четверо в кубе, Лео и Тиг and Кощей. Начало.

=== Assassination attempt ===
On April 18, 2014, an assassination attempt was made on Stavrovich during the day on Sadovaya Street in St. Petersburg near the Stoker cafe, where an autograph session by the band Slot was scheduled to take place. 19-year-old Dmitry Kostryukov, who had threatened Stavrovich with death on social media before the crime, stabbed her several times in the neck and arm. Slot band singer Igor "Cash" Lobanov managed to restrain the perpetrator until the police arrived, while fan Vitali used improvised means to stop the bleeding, until an ambulance arrived. By the time the ambulance arrived, Stavrovich had lost a lot of blood and went into cardiac arrest. According to eyewitnesses, Kostryukov said when he saw Stavrovich being carried on a stretcher to the ambulance: "She's not dead yet? No one should take her!"

Stavrovich was stabbed in the neck (damaging blood vessels in the neck, jugular vein and trachea) and arm, and was hospitalized in the intensive care unit of the Mariinsky Hospital in serious condition. In the hospital, she underwent surgery on the blood vessels in her neck and trachea and she got blood transfusion. Stavrovich recovered quickly, was discharged from the hospital on April 28, and soon returned to work.

Dmitry Kostryukov told police during interrogation that he had prepared the crime by researching the routes and performances of the Slot band. The investigation revealed that Kostryukov had sent Stavrovich numerous emails and messages, including threats, some of which contained the words "see you in the next life". According to Stavrovich, she discarded them and marked them as spam, when she started receiving these emails. Before the incident, a fan of the Slot band posted a screenshot to the musicians social media group and tried to warn them about an assassination attempt on Stavrovich, but no one took the information seriously. Kostryukov was later declared mentally ill, diagnosed with schizophrenia and placed in a psychiatric hospital for treatment.

== Discography ==
=== As a member of Slot ===
==== Studio albums ====
- 2007 — 2 войны (переиздание)
- 2007 — Тринити
- 2009 — 4ever
- 2011 — F5
- 2011 — Break the Code
- 2013 — Шестой
- 2016 — Septima
- 2018 — 200 кВт
- 2021 — Инстинкт выживания

=== Nuki Formation ===
==== Studio albums ====
Name	Info
Живы! (Alive!)	Release: April 28, 2013; Record label: M2BA; Format: CD, digital distribution
Пыльца лунной бабочки (Moon Butterfly Pollen)	Release: May 19, 2015; Record label: M2BA; Format: CD, digital distribution
Исключения (Exceptions)	Release: November 24, 2017; Record label: M2BA; Format: CD, digital distribution
Волки смотрят в лес (Wolves Look into the Forest)	Release: January 31, 2020; Record label: M2BA; Format: CD, digital distribution
Терапия (Therapy)	Release: November 22, 2024; Record label: M2BA; Format: CD, digital distribution

==== EPs ====
Name	Info
Ау (Hey)	Release: April 14, 2017; Record label: M2BA; Format: digital distribution
Акустика на случай зомби-апокалипсиса. Ч.1 (Acoustics for the Zombie Apocalypse, Part 1)	Release: March 28, 2025; Record label: M2BA; Format: digital distribution

==== Compilations ====
Name	Info
10 лет (10 years)	Release: September 2, 2022; Record label: M2BA; Format: digital distribution

==== Live albums ====
Name	Info
Акустика (live) (Acoustics live)	Release: September 11, 2020; Record label: M2BA; Format: CD, digital distribution
10 лет в космосе (10 years in space)	Release: April 7, 2023; Record label: M2BA; Format: digital distribution

==== Singles ====
Name	Album	Year
«Бойся» "Be afraid"	Живы! "Alive!"	2012
«Живы!» "Alive!"	Живы! "Alive!"	2013
«Научи» "Teach"	Живы! "Alive!"	2013
«Иллюзия» "Illusion"	Пыльца лунной бабочки "Moon Butterfly Pollen"	2015
«Реальность» "Reality"	Пыльца лунной бабочки "Moon Butterfly Pollen"	2016
«Танцуй, клоун, танцуй» "Dance, Clown, Dance"	Исключения "Exceptions"	2016
«Мыпростоесть» "We Just Are"	Исключения "Exceptions"	2016
«Страна» "Country"	Волки смотрят в лес "Wolves Look into the Forest"	2019
«Пищевая цепочка» "Food Chain"	Волки смотрят в лес "Wolves Look into the Forest"	2020
«Измерения» "Dimensions"	10 лет (сборник) "10 Years (collection)"	2022
«Саботаж» "Sabotage"	Терапия "Therapy"	2024
«Спичка» "Match"	Терапия "Therapy"	2024
«Не нужны» "Not Needed"	Терапия "Therapy"	2024
«Что от нас остаётся» "What's Left of Us?"	Non-album single	2025
«Тварь» "Creature"	Non-album single	2025
«Solve et Coagula»	Non-album single	2026

== Music videos ==
Clip	Director	Album	Year
«Бойся» "Be Afraid"	Mihail Emeljanov	Живы! "Alive!"	2012
«Живы!»! "Alive!"	Mihail Emeljanov	Живы! "Alive!"	2013
«Научи» "Teach"	Anna Gogitšaišvili	Живы! "Alive!"	2013
«Иллюзия» "Illusion"	Ilja Tuz	Пыльца лунной бабочки "Moon Butterfly Pollen"	2015
«Мыпростоесть» "We Just Are"	Konstantin Kukin	Исключения "Exceptions"	2016
«Реальность» "Reality"	Ilja Tuz	Пыльца лунной бабочки "Moon Butterfly Pollen"	2017
«Продолжаем движение» "Let's Keep Moving"	Konstantin Kukin	Исключения "Exceptions"	2018
«Страна» "Coyntry"	Konstantin Korolev	Волки смотрят в лес "Wolves Look into the Forest"	2019
«Пищевая цепочка» "Food Chain"	Konstantin Korolev	Волки смотрят в лес "Wolves Look into the Forest"	2020
«Горячо» "Hot"	Konstantin Korolev	Волки смотрят в лес "Wolves Look into the Forest"	2021
«Знаки» "Signs"	Filming: Kostya Fedorov, Tanya Fedjunina, Katya Zayats	Исключения "Exceptions"	2022
«Спичка» "Match"	Alina Brazhnikova, Daria Stavrovich (idea), Konstantin Kukin, Alexander Pavlikov (shoot)	Терапия "Therapy"	2024
«Не нужны» "Not Needed"	Alina Brazhnikova, Nikolai Savichev (shoot)	Терапия "Therapy"	2024
«Катись» "Roll"	Lava Vision (producer)	Терапия "Therapy"	2025
«Тварь» "Creature"	Ilja Tuz	Non-album Single	2025
«Solve et Coagula»	Ilja Tuz	Non-album Single	2026
