= George Watson's College =

Coordinates: 55°55′49″N 3°13′4″W

Location
- Colinton Road (Merchiston); Edinburgh, EH10 5EG; Scotland

Information
- Type: Public school Co-educational, private
- Motto: Ex Corde Caritas (Love from the Heart)
- Established: 3 April 1723; 303 years ago (as George Watson's Hospital)
- Founder: George Watson
- Principal: Lisa Kerr
- Age: 3 to 18
- Enrollment: 2,358
- Area: 50 acres (20 hectares)
- Campus type: Urban parkland
- Houses: Cockburn-Greyfriars, Lauriston, Melville-Ogilvie, Preston-Falconhall
- Colours: Maroon, white
- Sports: Rugby, hockey, cricket, rowing, badminton, squash, football, sailing, rifle shooting, skiing, athletics, tennis, rock climbing, polo, surfing, fencing, curling, chess.
- Rival: George Heriot's School
- Publication: The Watsonian, Caritas, Recorder, Tick Talk
- Alumni: Watsonians
- Website: gwc.org.uk
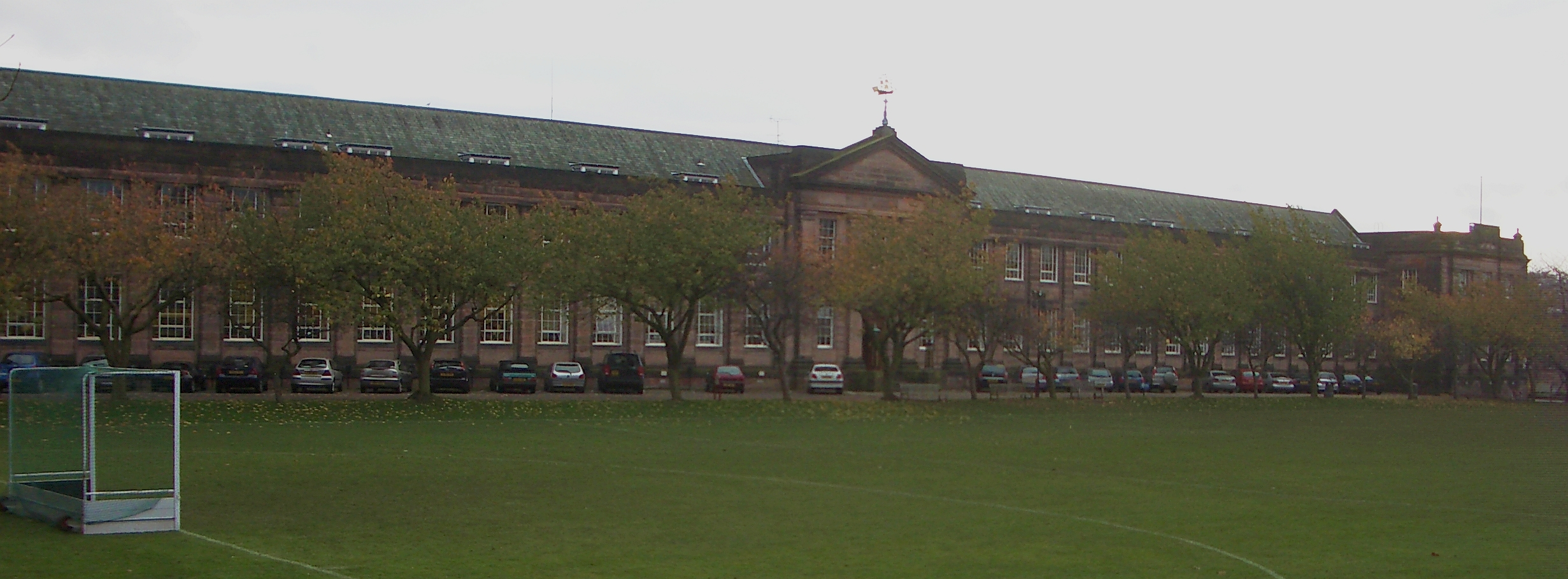

George Watson's College is a co-educational private day school in Scotland, situated on Colinton Road, in the Merchiston area of Edinburgh. It was first established as a hospital school in 1723, became a day school in 1871, and was merged with its sister school George Watson's Ladies College in 1974. It is a Merchant Company of Edinburgh school and a member of the Headmasters' and Headmistresses' Conference.

== History ==
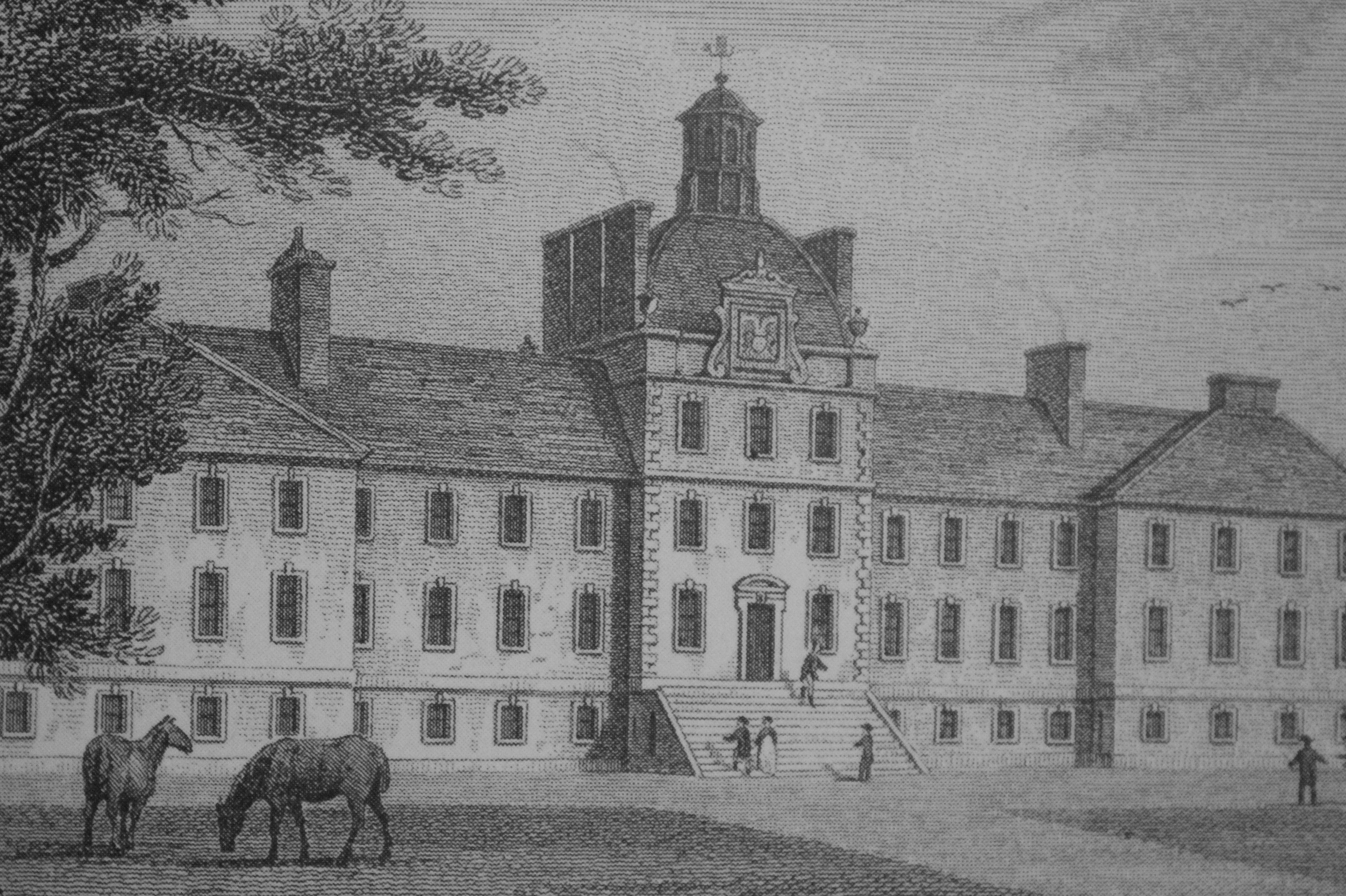
Engraving of the original George Watson's Hospital, Edinburgh c.1850

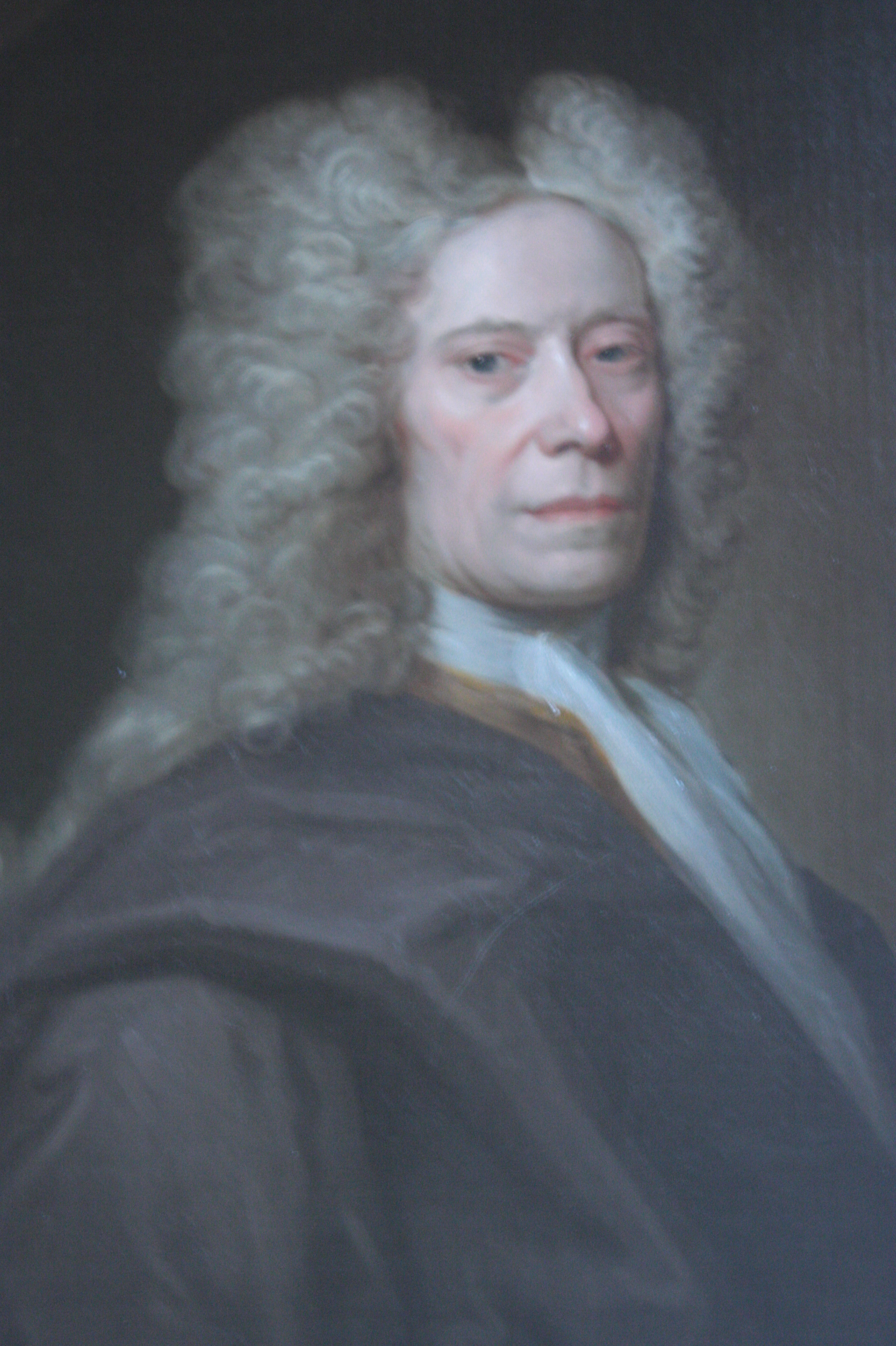
George Watson by William Aikman

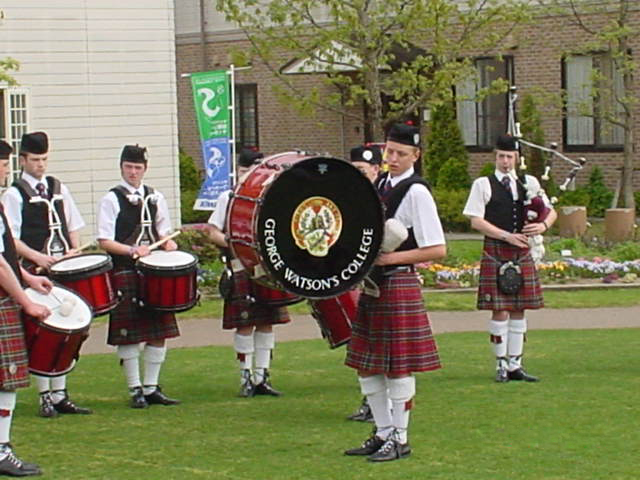
The school pipe band at Sanix World Rugby Youth Invitational Tournament, Global Arena, Japan 2006

=== Foundation ===
The school was established according to the instructions of George Watson (1654–1723) who bequeathed the bulk of his fortune of £12,000 – a vast sum in 1723 – to found a school for the provision of post-primary boarding education. George Watson, since 1696, had been clerk to Sir John Dick.

Unlike his father, John Watson, George was not a member of the Merchant Company of Edinburgh, but he was impressed by their co-founding and running of the Merchant Maiden Hospital (a girls school founded in 1694) and so he chose the company to implement the terms of his will to create an equivalent facility for the sons of merchants. After some years, the Governors bought land known as Heriot's Croft, located off Lauriston Place in Edinburgh, close to the Meadows and opposite George Heriot's School, and engaged an architect. The foundation stone was laid on 22 May 1738, and the school opened as George Watson's Hospital on Whitsunday, 17 May 1741. The initial roll consisted of 11 boys, aged 9–10 years; by 1749 there were 30, while in 1842 pupils numbered 86, this figure being maintained until the end of the Hospital system in 1870.

In accordance with Watson's will, the governors were responsible for former pupils up to the age of 25; they were helped to find apprenticeships and paid an allowance. Watson's stated preference was for allowing the hospital's charges to become skilled workers, though the governors also allowed boys who showed an ability to pursue medicine or academia.

=== Transatlantic slave trade ===
Research in 2020 revealed that there is a strong likelihood that part of George Watson's fortune was acquired in the transatlantic slave trade. The college states that they are "moving forward in the acknowledgement of aspects of our heritage which have previously been ignored", and have conducted discussions with parents pupils and others on the "important and troubling questions about George Watson".

=== Re-establishment as a day school ===
By the 1860s, the hospital school system had fallen into general public disrepute, while the Merchant Company was fearful both of government intervention in the schooling system. The solution was to re-found Watson's, and the three other hospitals under its governorship, as day schools. In July 1868 the Company applied to Parliament for powers to re-organise their schools and make different use of their endowments so as to make education more widely available. Watson's was thus completely transformed, reopening on 26 September 1870 as a fee-paying day school with a roll of 800 boys, initially called George Watson's College Schools for Boys.

In 1869, the original hospital building was sold to the Royal Infirmary of Edinburgh. When the infirmary sought to expand in 1871, the school moved a short distance west to the former Merchant Maiden Hospital building in Archibald Place. The original hospital building was incorporated into the infirmary, and the chapel remained in use as the hospital chapel until the infirmary was itself moved away. The remains of the building were demolished in 2004 during the redevelopment of the infirmary site by the Quartermile consortium.

In 1902 the college was the first prestigious Scottish secondary school to appoint a woman head. The school's staff were mainly men and there were 930 pupils. Charlotte Ainslie was an ex-pupil who had studied at Bedford College and now led George Watson's Ladies' College.

=== 1932 buildings ===
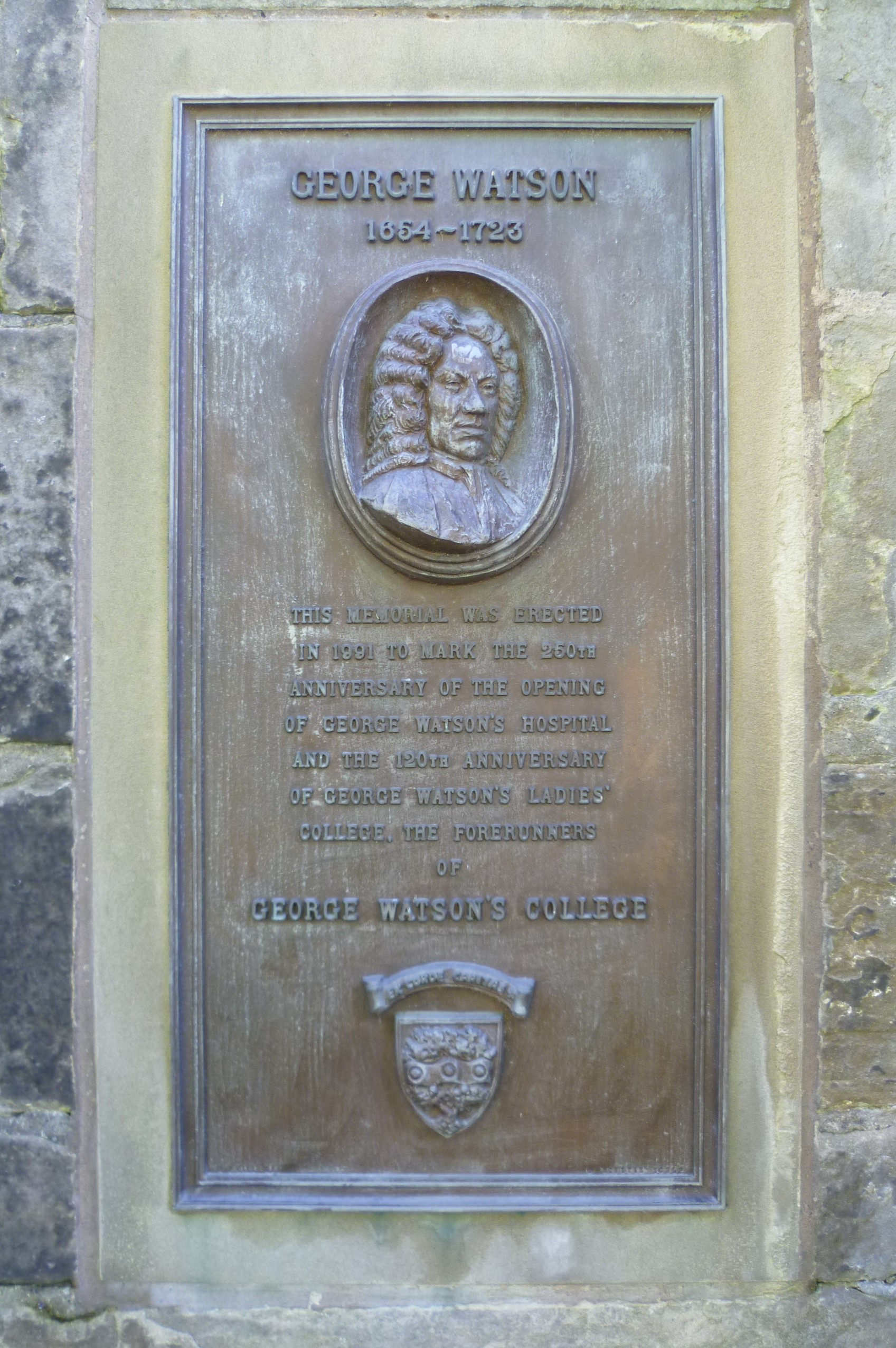
250th anniversary plaque in Edinburgh's Greyfriars Kirkyard

In the years following World War I, the Royal Infirmary of Edinburgh needed to expand once more and was interested in the site then occupied by Watson's. At the same time, the Archibald Place building was cramped and in need of modernisation, as well as being distant from the school's playing fields at Myreside. In 1924 the Merchant Company announced that they had taken the decision to sell the Archibald Place building to the Infirmary.

In 1927, agreement was made to acquire the site of Merchiston Castle School – adjacent to the Myreside playing fields – and a competition was held to design the new school building. The new building, facing Colinton Road, was designed by James B Dunn, in the neo-classical style, built in sandstone and was opened by Prince George (later Duke of Kent) on 22 September 1932.

In October 1962, the school launched and appeal for £230,000 to meet the cost of building extensions.

The Golden Jubilee of the creation of the 1932 buildings fell in 1982, and was marked by a number of celebrations. These culminated on 29 June with a visit from Her Majesty Queen Elizabeth. The Queen spent two hours touring the campus, including a short concert, and she unveiled a commemorative plaque.

=== George Watson's Ladies College ===
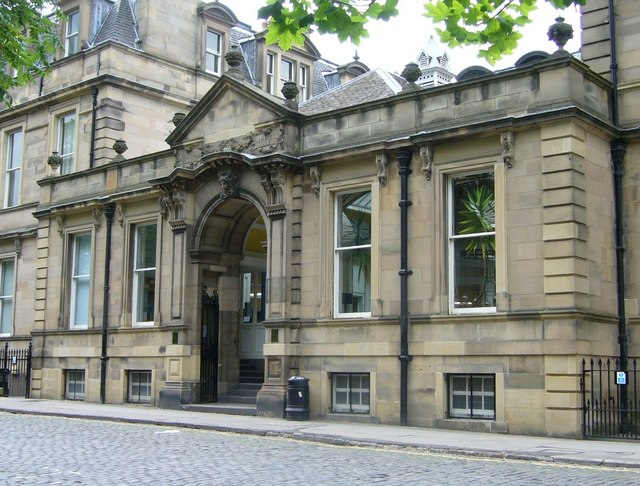
George Square Melville House, built in 1871 on the site of Admiral Duncan's house, was the home of George Watson's Ladies College until sold to Edinburgh University in 1974.

In February 1871, the Company took over the lease of Melville House in George Square, Edinburgh and used it as the location of the nascent George Watson's College Schools for Young Ladies. It was renamed to George Watson's College for Ladies in 1877, and to George Watson's Ladies College in 1890.

=== Amalgamation ===
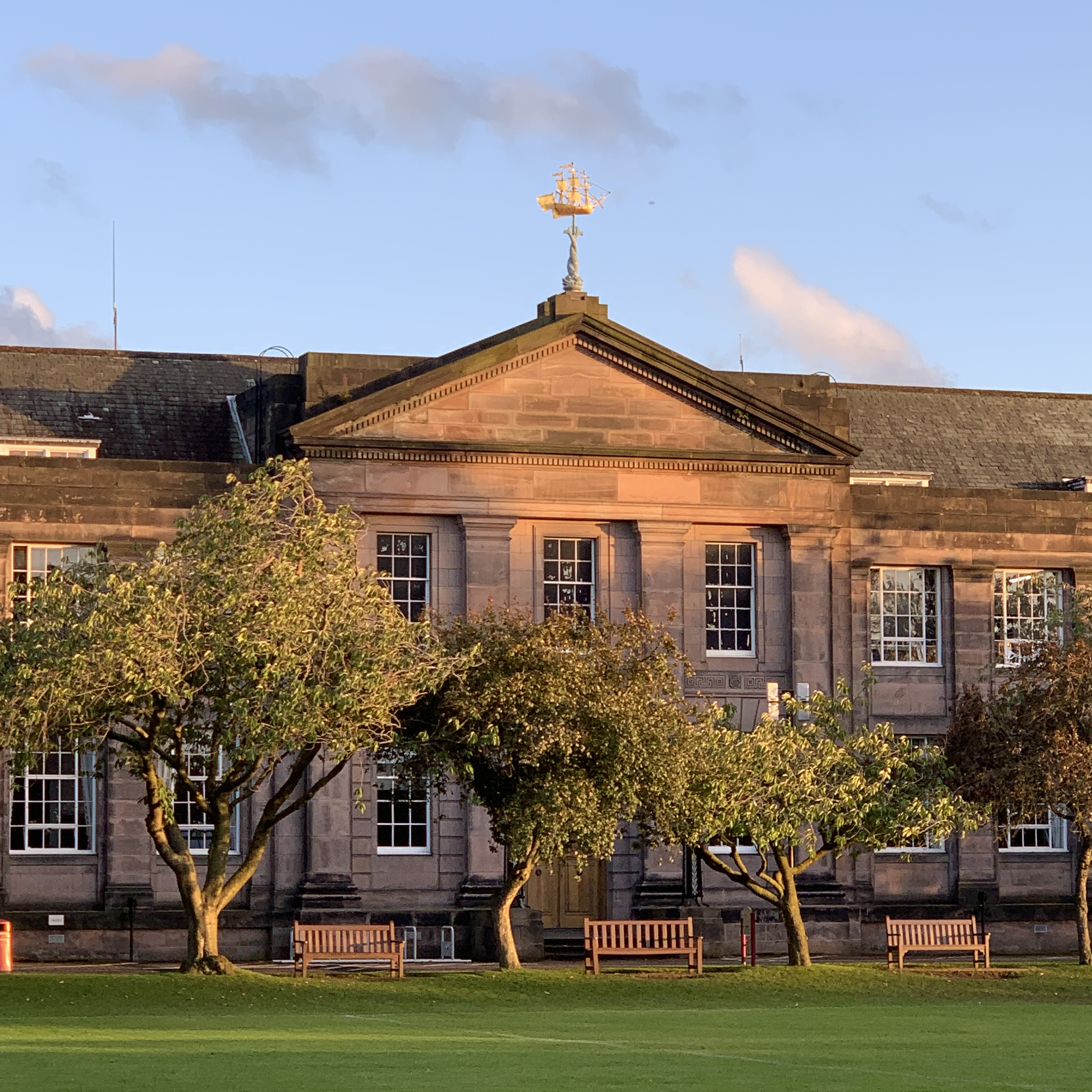
George Watson's College, Colinton Road

In 1967, the Merchant Company announced its plan to combine the two Watson's Colleges to form a single co-educational campus in Colinton Road. Building work was required to house the combined school. The first joint assembly of the amalgamated school was held on 1 October 1974. The school found itself in the Guinness Book of Records as the largest co-educational school in Scotland, with a roll of over 2,400 pupils.

== Notable alumni ==
Former pupils are referred to at the school as Watsonians. According to the Sutton Trust, the school is placed first in Scotland and joint 29th in the United Kingdom for the number of the nation's leading people produced.

== Notable staff ==
- Charlotte Ainslie – first woman head at a prestigious Scottish school.
- Andrew J. G. Barclay and Alexander Yule Fraser – Maths masters, joint founders of the Edinburgh Mathematical Society
- William Dickson (1905–1992) – Head of Science. The only schoolteacher to have been elected a Fellow of the Royal Society of Chemistry.
- Peter Pinkerton – maths master, 1903 to 1913
- Anum Qaisar – MP for the SNP who taught Modern Studies.
- Robert T. Skinner – taught mathematics in the school 1893 to 1899
- Liz Smith – Scottish Conservative politician and former cricketer, who taught Economics and Modern Studies.
- Sir Roger Young – Headmaster of the school from 1958 to 1985, chairman of the Head Masters' Conference in 1976 and governor of BBC Scotland from 1979 to 1984. Knighted in 1985.
