= Midlothian (historic) =

Historic county of Scotland

- Midlothian / Edinburghshire within Scotland
- History
  - Succeeded by: Lothian Region
- Status: Local government county (until 1975)
- Government: County: Edinburghshire County Council (1890–1947); Midlothian County Council (1947–1975); Formed most of Midlothian district (1975–1996); Forms most of Midlothian council area (1996–)
  - HQ: Edinburgh

Midlothian is a historic county of Scotland. It emerged in the Middle Ages as the territory surrounding the city of Edinburgh within the wider Lothian region, and was formally called the "shire of Edinburgh" or Edinburghshire until the 20th century. It bordered West Lothian (Linlithgowshire) to the west, Lanarkshire, Peeblesshire and Selkirkshire to the south, and East Lothian (Haddingtonshire), Berwickshire and Roxburghshire to the east. Traditional industries included mining, agriculture and fishing, important towns outwith Edinburgh being Dalkeith, Musselburgh and Penicuik. Having always had a degree of autonomy over its own affairs since being made a county of itself in 1482, an Edinburgh City Corporation was formed in 1890, although it remained under Midlothian for some purposes. Conversely, the wider county was still administered within the city.

Midlothian County Council was abolished in 1975 under the Local Government (Scotland) Act 1973, which abolished Scotland's counties and burghs as administrative areas and created a new two-tier system of upper-tier regions and lower-tier districts. Most of Midlothian formed a new, smaller district called Midlothian within the Lothian Region; parts of the county's territory (including all the coastal territory at Musselburgh) went to the City of Edinburgh, East Lothian and West Lothian districts within the Lothian region, and to the Ettrick and Lauderdale district in the Borders region. This then became a standalone local authority area in the most recent major reorganisation enacted in 1996, retaining those same boundaries and name.

== History ==
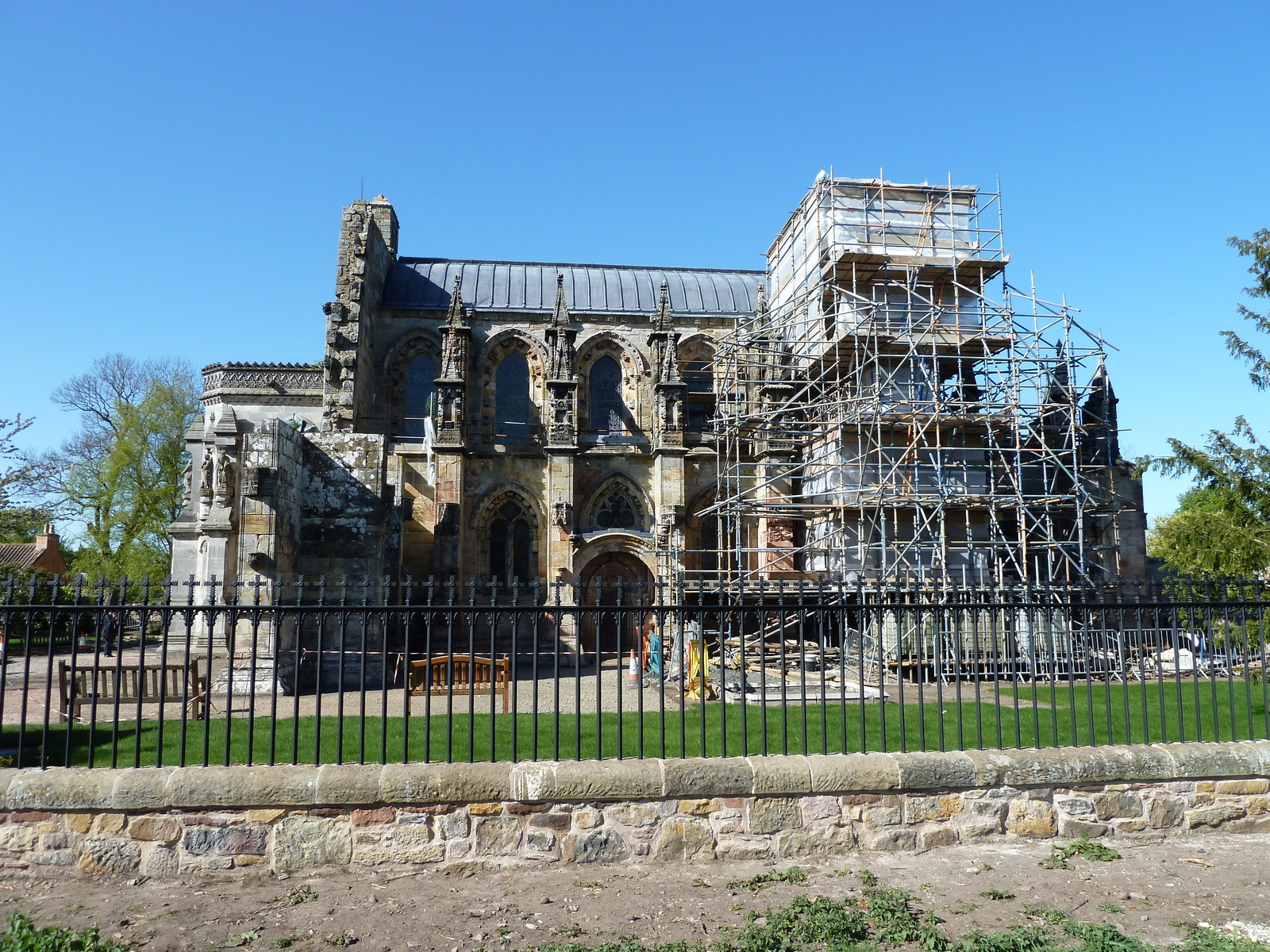
Rosslyn Chapel, in the grounds of Roslin Castle.

Following the end of the Roman occupation of Britain, Lothian was populated by Brythonic-speaking ancient Britons and formed part of Gododdin, within the Hen Ogledd or Old North. In the seventh century, Gododdin fell to the Angles, with Lothian becoming part of the kingdom of Bernicia. Bernicia united into the Kingdom of Northumbria which itself became part of the early Kingdom of England. Lothian came under the control of the Scottish monarchy in the tenth century.

In the Middle Ages, Lothian was the scene of several historic conflicts between the kingdoms of Scotland and England. The Battle of Roslin took place in 1303 at Roslin as part of the First War of Scottish Independence. A Scottish army led by Simon Fraser and John Comyn defeated an army led by English commander John Segrave.

Along with other parts of the Lothians, the county was involved in the Rough Wooing when Roslin Castle, seat of the Earl of Caithness, was destroyed in 1544 by forces of Henry VIII of England.

In the 17th century, the county featured in the War of the Three Kingdoms, where General George Monck had his base at Dalkeith Castle as the Commonwealth's Commander in Scotland. Following the Restoration of the monarchy, the "Pentland Rising" in the region culminated with the Battle of Rullion Green in 1666, a decisive victory for the Government forces against Covenanter rebels.

In 1650, Oliver Cromwell's army came to Dalkeith. His officer General George Monck, was commander in Scotland, and the government of the country was based out of Dalkeith castle.

The 1878–1880 Midlothian campaign by British Liberal politician William Ewart Gladstone entered history as an early example of modern political campaigning, resulting in Gladstone taking the Midlothian constituency from the long-time Conservative member of parliament William Montagu Douglas Scott and going on to become Prime Minister of the United Kingdom.

== Governance ==
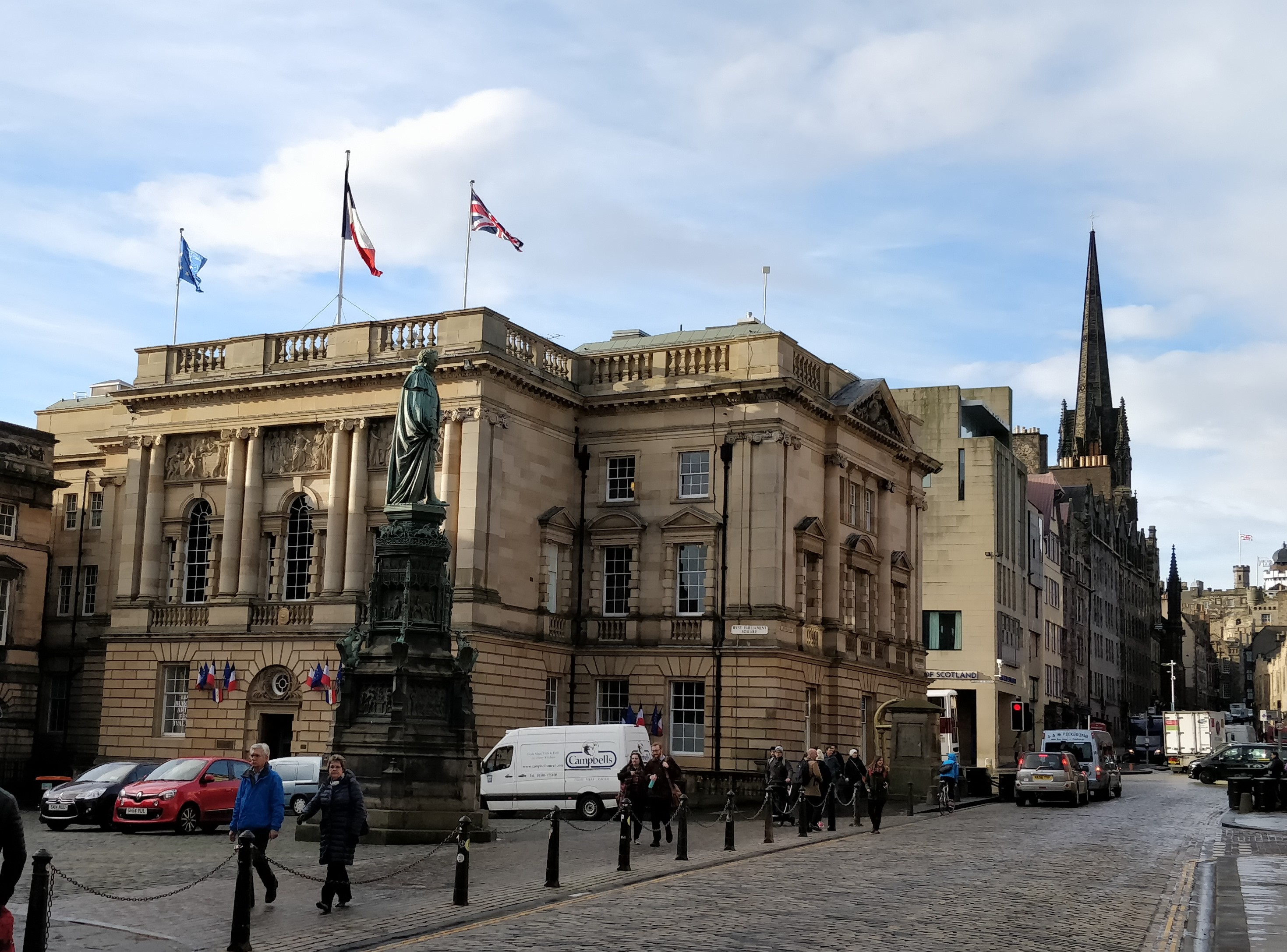
Lothian Chambers, the former headquarters of Midlothian County Council, now home to Edinburgh's French Consulate and the French Institute for Scotland

The origins of the historic county of Midlothian are obscure; it emerged as a shire (the area controlled by a sheriff) in the Middle Ages, and was certainly in existence by the reign of David I (reigned 1124–1153). It covered the central part of the former kingdom or province of Lothian, and was formally called the "shire of Edinburgh" or "Edinburghshire", although the alternative name "Midlothian" was also used from a very early date. The burgh of Edinburgh became administratively independent from the surrounding county in 1482 when James III granted the burgh the right to appoint its own sheriff and coroner, making it a county of itself.

Commissioners of Supply were established for each shire in 1667, and served as the main administrative body for the county until elected county councils were created in 1890 under the Local Government (Scotland) Act 1889, taking most of the commissioners' functions. The commissioners for Edinburghshire, and the county council which followed them, did not have jurisdiction over the city of Edinburgh, which was administered by the town council of the burgh.

From its creation in 1890 the county council called itself "Midlothian County Council". However, the legal name of the county remained the "county of Edinburgh" or "Edinburghshire". In 1913 the county council petitioned the government to formally change the name to Midlothian. The government responded that it would direct all government departments to use Midlothian rather than Edinburghshire, but that a formal change of name needed to be done by statute and it could not justify the parliamentary time to make such a change. The statutory change of name from Edinburghshire to Midlothian eventually took place in 1947, under section 127 of the Local Government (Scotland) Act 1947 (10 & 11 Geo. 6. c. 43). Midlothian County Council was based at Midlothian County Buildings, built in 1904 on George IV Bridge in Edinburgh on the site of the earlier County Buildings.

Midlothian County Council was abolished in 1975 under the Local Government (Scotland) Act 1973, which abolished Scotland's counties and burghs as administrative areas and created a new two-tier system of upper-tier regions and lower-tier districts. Most of Midlothian's territory went to a new district called Midlothian within the Lothian Region. The Midlothian district was smaller than the area of the pre-1975 county, parts of which went to the City of Edinburgh, East Lothian and West Lothian districts within the Lothian region, and to the Ettrick and Lauderdale district in the Borders region.

The boundaries of the historic county, including the city of Edinburgh, are still used for some limited official purposes connected with land registration, being a registration county. For lieutenancy purposes, the last lord-lieutenant of the county of Midlothian was made lord-lieutenant for the new district of Midlothian when the reforms came into effect in 1975. The Midlothian lieutenancy area corresponds to the current council area rather than the historic county. The former county council's headquarters in Edinburgh became the offices of the new Lothian Regional Council, whilst the Midlothian District Council established its headquarters in Dalkeith.

The Lothian region was abolished in 1996; its four districts, including Midlothian, became unitary council areas, sing the 1975 names and boundaries.

== Geography ==
Map contrasting the area comprising Midlothian council (dark blue) within the historic county of Midlothian (light blue).

The historic county has a roughly trapezoidal shape; it consists of a fairly flat area along the Firth of Forth, which is heavily urbanised and dominated by the Edinburgh conurbation. Off the coast lie the small islands of Inchmickery and Cramond Island. The land gradually rises to the south, with the Pentland Hills in the south-west, Moorfoot Hills in the centre-south and the Lammermuir Hills in the far south-east. Blackhope Scar on the border with Peeblesshire is the highest point in the county at 651 m (2,136 ft). The county contains no lochs of any size, though there are many reservoirs, most notably Gladhouse Reservoir, Rosebery Reservoir, Edgelaw Reservoir, Loganlea Reservoir, Glencorse Reservoir, Threipmuir Reservoir, Harlaw Reservoir, Harperrig Reservoir, Crosswood Reservoir, Morton Reservoir and Cobbinshaw Reservoir.

== Settlements ==
=== Within both historic and modern Midlothian ===
- Arniston
- Auchendinny
- Bilston
- Bonnyrigg
- Borthwick
- Carrington
- Cornbank
- Cousland
- Crichton
- Dalkeith
- Danderhall
- D'Arcy
- Deanburn
- Dewartown
- Easthouses
- Easter Howgate
- Edgehead
- Eight Mile Burn
- Eskbank
- Fala
- Ford
- Gorebridge
- Gowkshill
- Hillend
- Hopefield
- Howgate
- Lasswade
- Leadburn
- Loanhead
- Mayfield
- Millerhill
- Milton Bridge
- Newbattle
- Newtongrange
- Nine Mile Burn
- North Middleton
- Pathhead
- Penicuik
- Polton
- Rosewell
- Roslin
- Shawfair
- Silverburn
- Straiton
- Temple
- Whitehill
- Woodburn

=== Transferred to the City of Edinburgh ===
- Balerno
- Currie
- Edinburgh
- Newbridge
- Ratho

=== Transferred to East Lothian ===
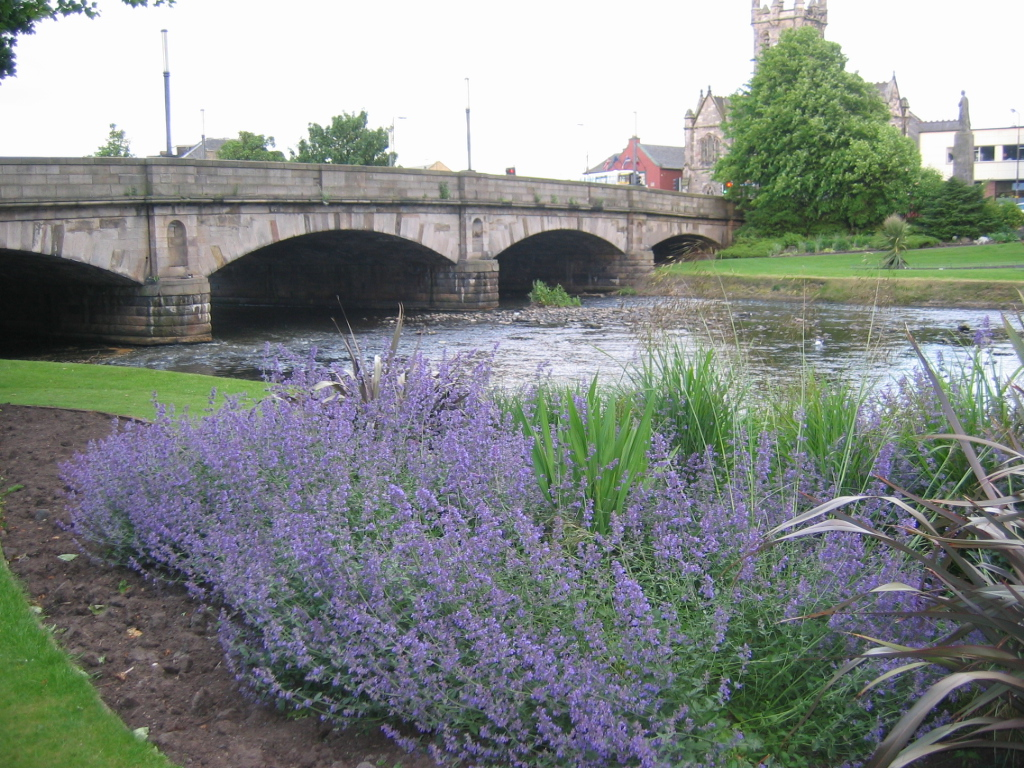
Musselburgh

- Fisherrow
- Inveresk
- Musselburgh
- Wallyford
- Whitecraig

=== Transferred to Scottish Borders ===
- Heriot
- Stow of Wedale

=== Transferred to West Lothian ===
- Adambrae
- Addiewell
- Bellsquarry
- Breich
- Cobbinshaw
- Craigshill
- Dedridge
- East Calder
- Harburn
- Howden
- Kirknewton
- Mid Calder
- Murieston
- Polbeth
- Pumpherston
- West Calder
- Wilkieston

== Civil parishes in the County of Midlothian ==
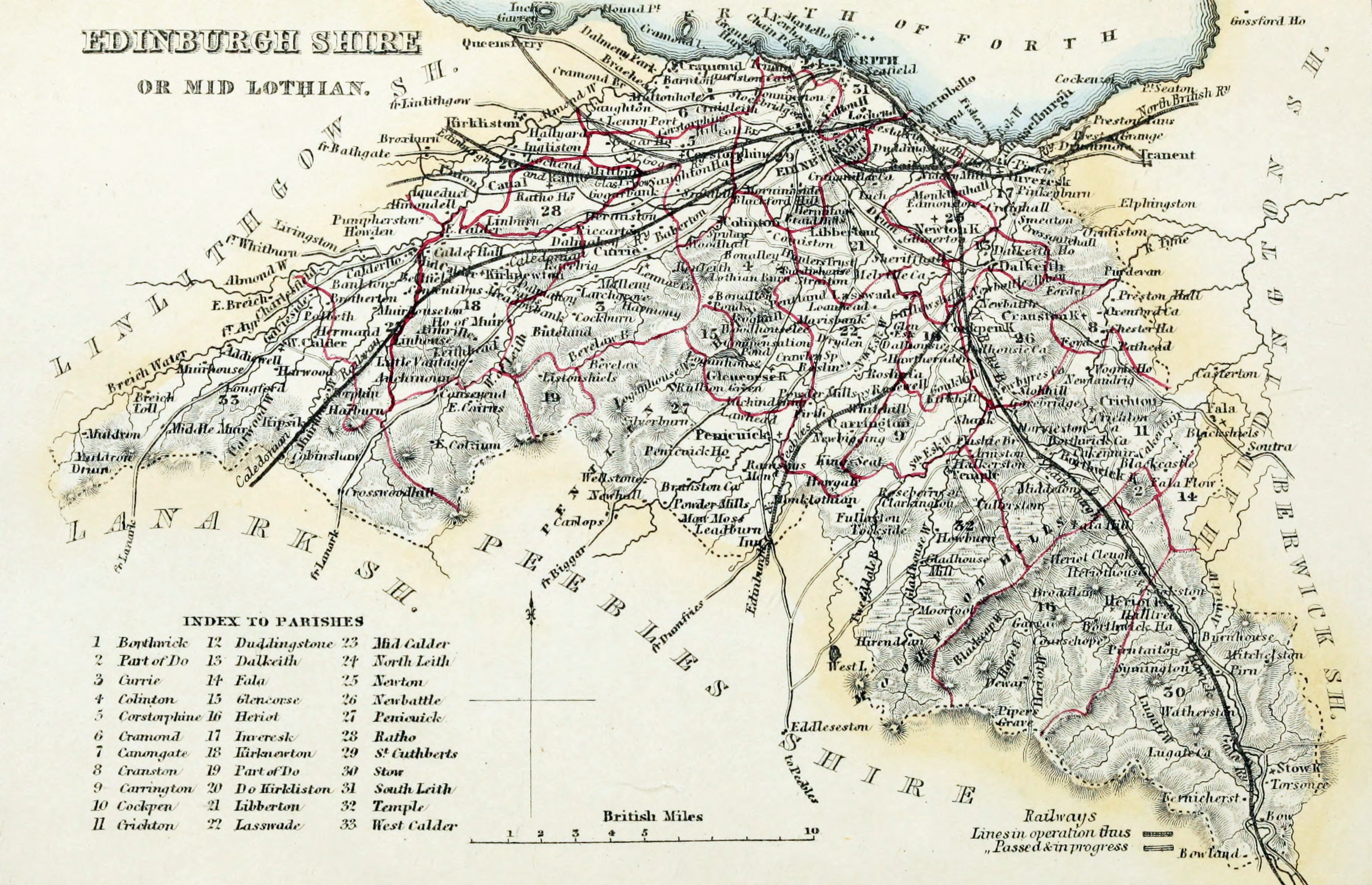
Midlothian or Edinburghshire Civil Parish map c. 1854. Boundaries outlined in red

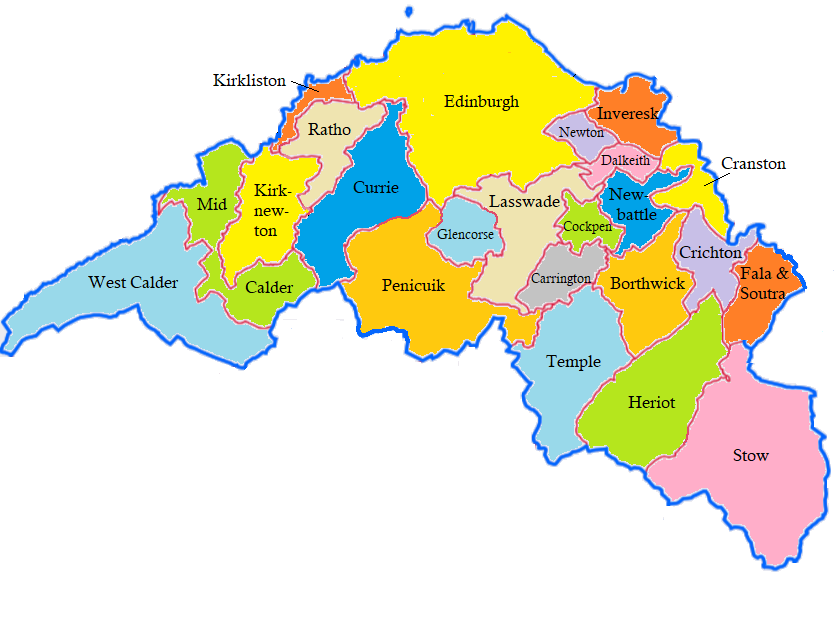
Current parishes in the area covered by Edinburghshire

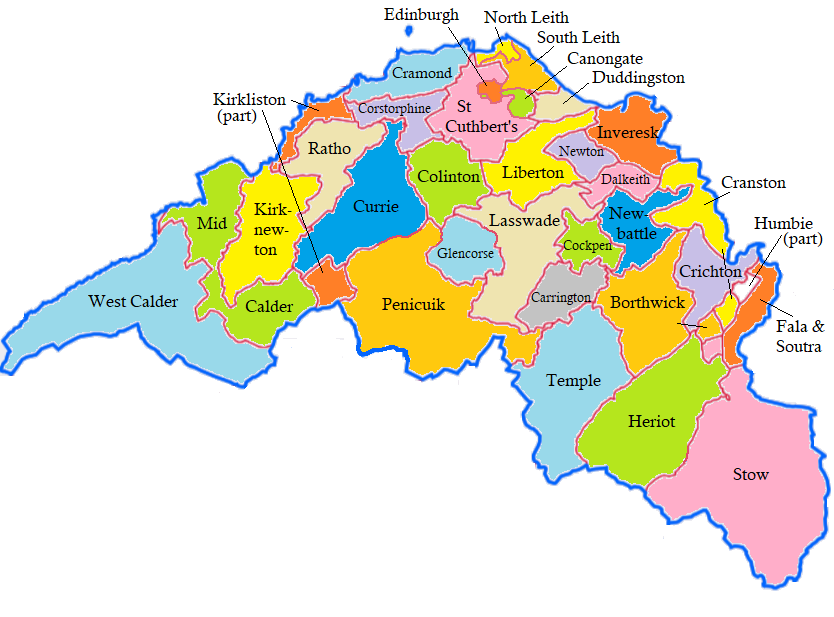
Parishes in Edinburghshire before the reforms of 1891

(Unitary authority indicated where not Midlothian. Boundaries defined by Local Government (Scotland) Act 1973)

- Borthwick
- Carrington
- Cockpen
- Cranston
- Crichton
- Currie (Edinburgh)
- Dalkeith
- Fala and Soutra
- Glencorse
- Heriot (Scottish Borders)
- Inveresk (East Lothian)
- Kirkliston (Edinburgh)
- Kirknewton (West Lothian)
- Lasswade
- Mid Calder (West Lothian)
- Newbattle
- Newton
- Penicuik
- Ratho (Edinburgh)
- Stow (Scottish Borders)
- Temple
- West Calder (West Lothian)

=== Former civil parishes now merged in the City of Edinburgh ===
Abolished 1902:

- Duddingston

Abolished 1920

- Colinton
- Corstorphine
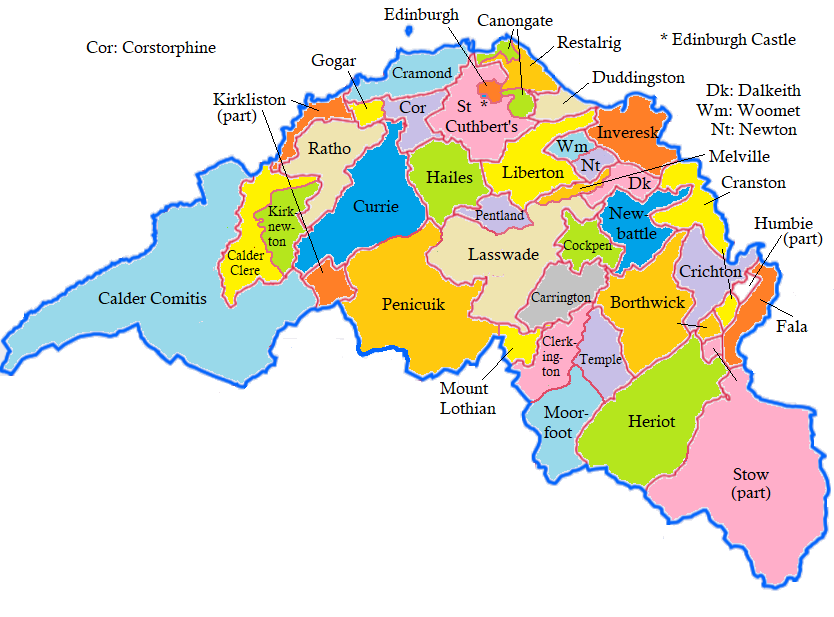
- The 37 medieval parishes in Edinburghshire
  Cramond
- Liberton

The above list does not include parishes which have been within the City of Edinburgh for county purposes since 19th century, namely within the "County of the City" of which the Lord Provost was and is Lord Lieutenant.
