= List of places in Midlothian =

Map of places in Midlothian compiled from this list
See the list of places in Scotland for places in other counties.

This List of places in Midlothian is a list of links for any town, village, hamlet, castle, golf course, historic house, hill fort, lighthouse, nature reserve, reservoir, river, and other place of interest in the Midlothian council area of Scotland.

== A ==
- Allermuir Hill
- Arniston, Arniston House
- Auchendinny

== B ==
- Beeslack Wood
- Birkenside
- Bonaly Reservoir
- Bonnyrigg
- Borthwick, Borthwick Castle
- Butterfly and Insect World

== C ==
- Carrington
- Castle Law
- Cotty Burn
- Cousland, Cousland Smiddy
- Craigesk
- Crichton, Crichton Castle, Crichton Collegiate Church

== D ==
- Dalhousie Castle, Dalhousie Falconry Centre
- Dalkeith, Dalkeith Estate, Dalkeith Palace
- Danderhall
- Dewartown
- Dun Law

== E ==
- Easter Howgate
- Easthouses, Easthouses Colliery
- Edgehead
- Edgelaw Reservoir
- Eight Mile Burn
- Eskbank

== F ==
- Fairfield House
- Fala
- Flotterstone, Flotterstone Visitor Centre
- Fountainhill
- Fushiebridge

== G ==
- Gladhouse Reservoir
- Glencorse Reservoir
- Gore Glen Woodland Park
- Gorebridge
- Gowkshill

== H ==
- Habbies Howe
- Hawthornden Castle
- Hillend
- Hirendean Castle
- Howgate

== L ==
- Lasswade
- Leadburn
- Loanhead
- Loganlea Reservoir

== M ==
- Mavisbank House
- Mayfield
- Middleton
- Midlothian Snowsports Centre
- Millerhill
- Milton Bridge
- Moorfoot Hills

== N ==
- National Mining Museum
- Newbattle, Newbattle Abbey
- Newtongrange
- Newton Village
- Nine Mile Burn
- North Esk Reservoir
- North Middleton

== O ==
- Old Pentland Cemetery
- Orchard
- Oxenfoord Castle

== P ==
- Pathhead
- Pittendreich House and Pittendreich Mill, Pittendreich
- Penicuik, Penicuik House, Penicuik North Kirk
- Pentland Hills, Pentland Hills Regional Park
- Preston Hall

== R ==
- Riddel
- River Esk
- Rosewell
- Roslin, Battle of Roslin, Roslin Castle, Rosslyn Chapel, Roslin Glen Country Park

== S ==
- Saltersgate School
- Shawfair
- Silverburn
- South Esk Valley Way
- Straiton Pond

== T ==
- Temple
- Turnhouse Hill
- Tyne Water
- Tyne-Esk Walk

== V ==
- Vogrie, Vogrie Country Park, Vogrie Golf Club, Vogrie House

== W ==
- Wallace's Cave
- Whitehill
- Woodburn
- Woodhouselee

== Gallery ==
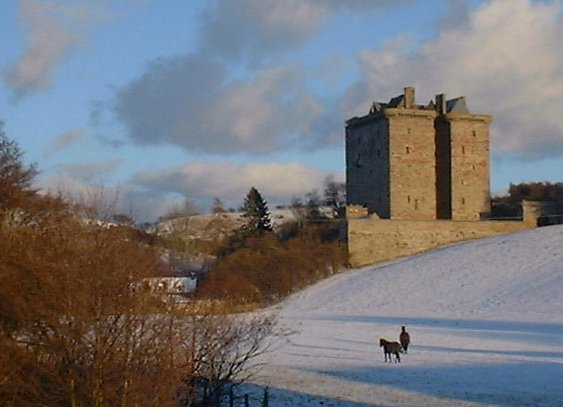
Borthwick Castle

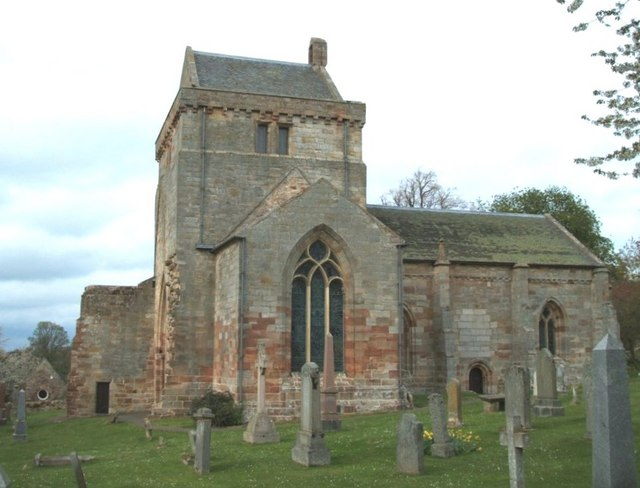
Crichton Collegiate Church

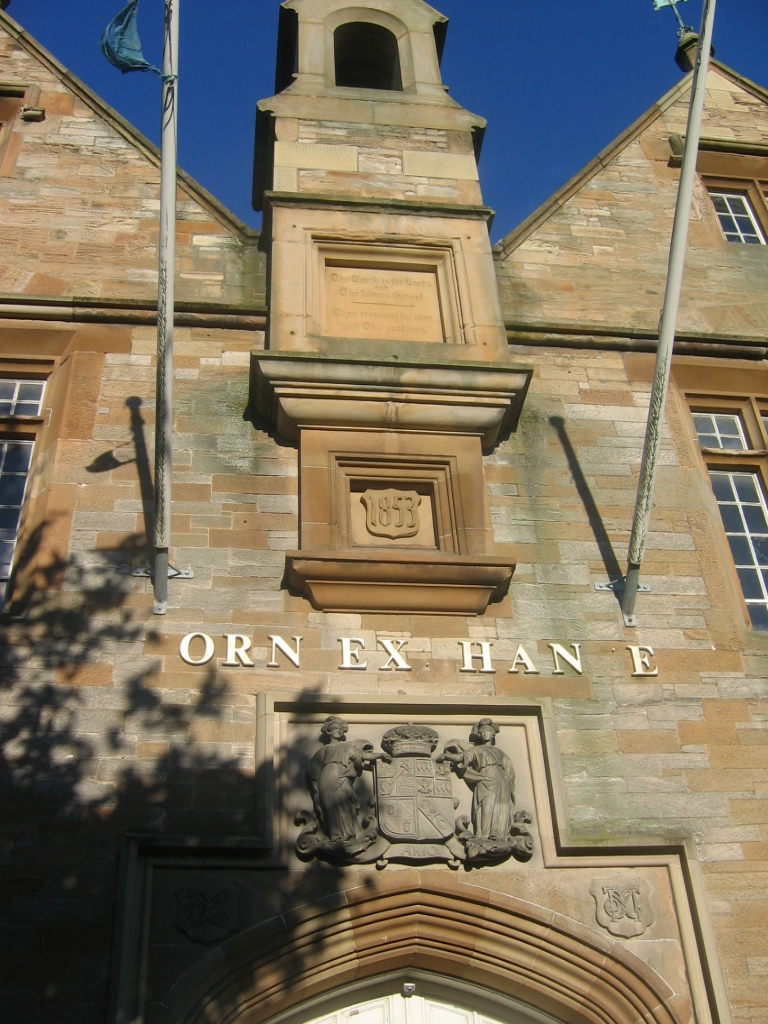
Dalkeith, Corn Exchange

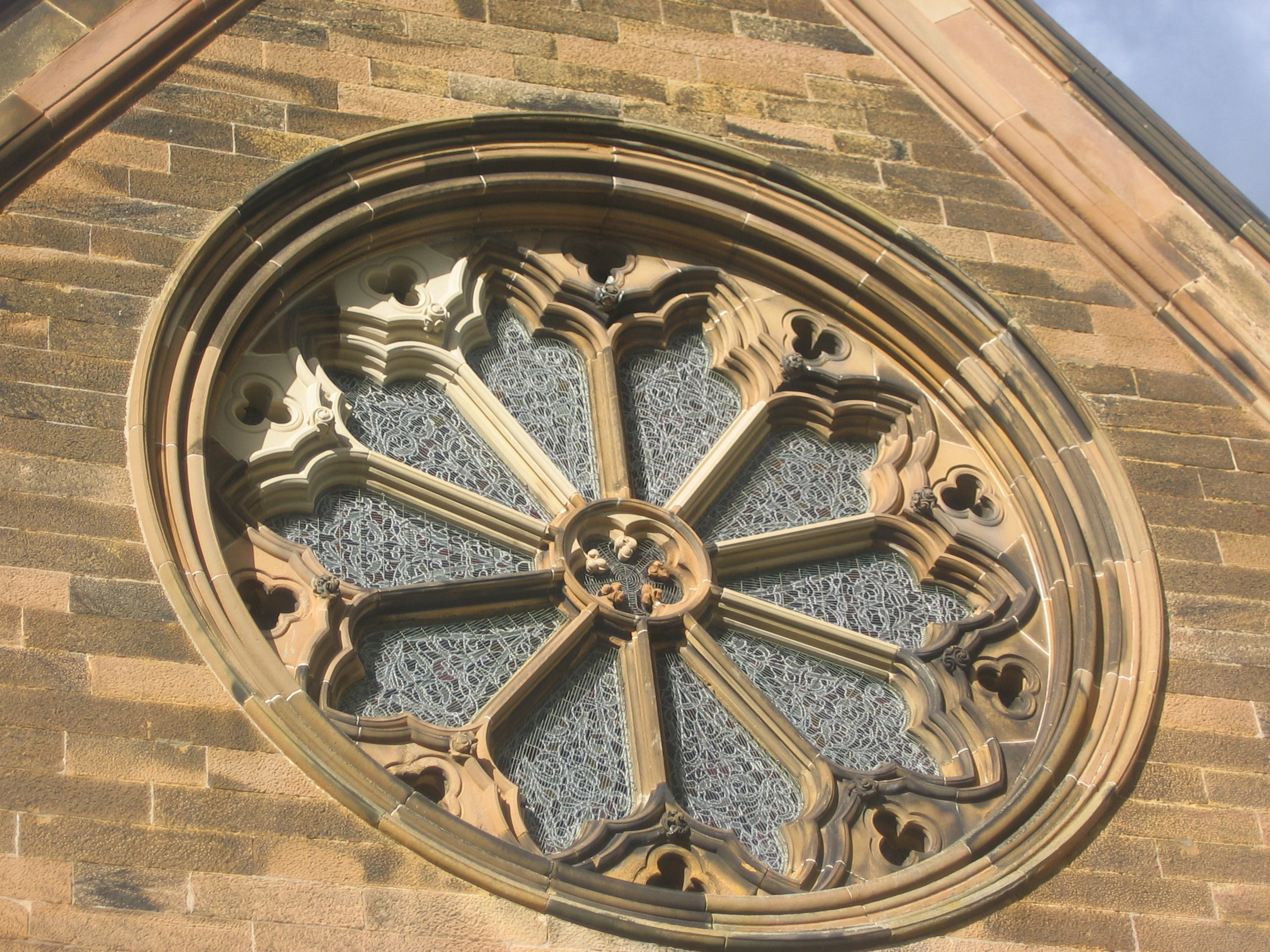
Dalkeith, St. Mary's Church

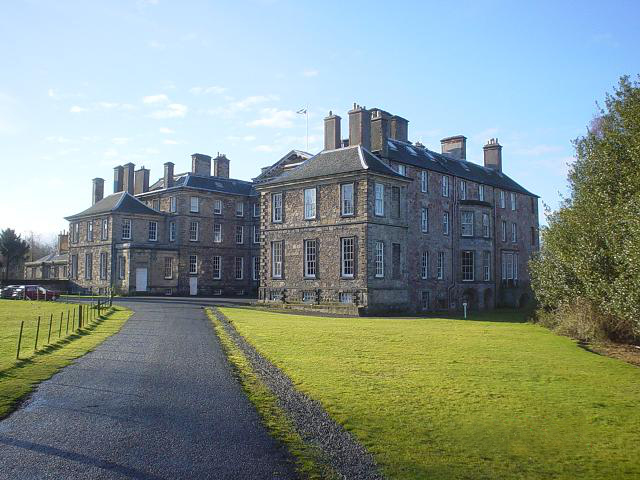
Dalkeith Palace, leased to the University of Wisconsin

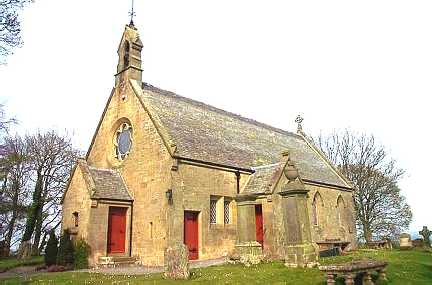
Fala Parish Church

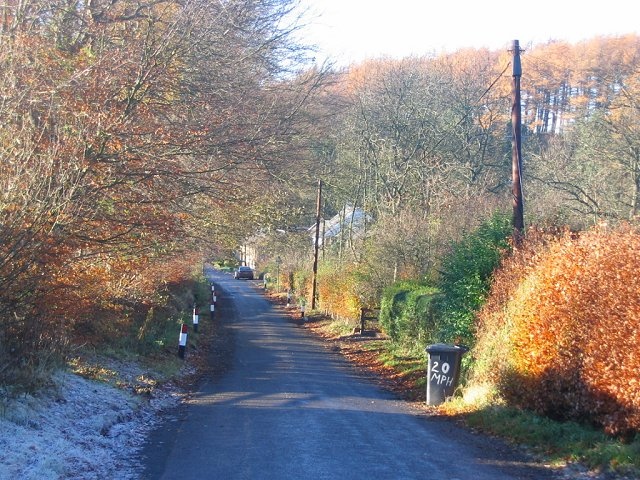
Fala Mill

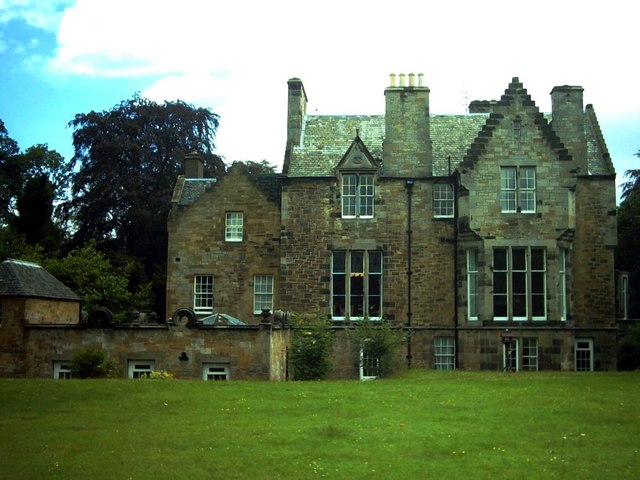
Pittendreich House, Lasswade

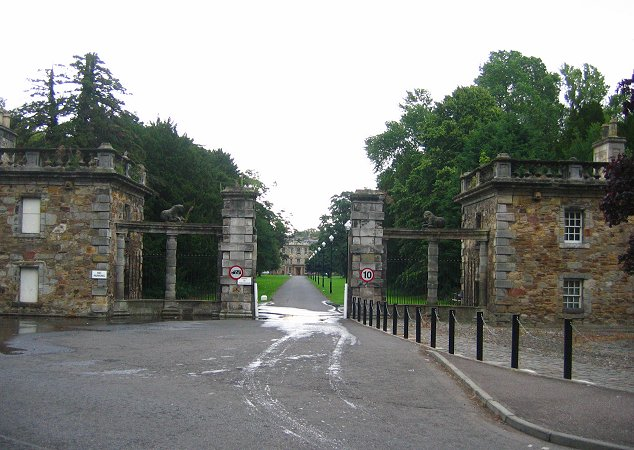
Newbattle Abbey

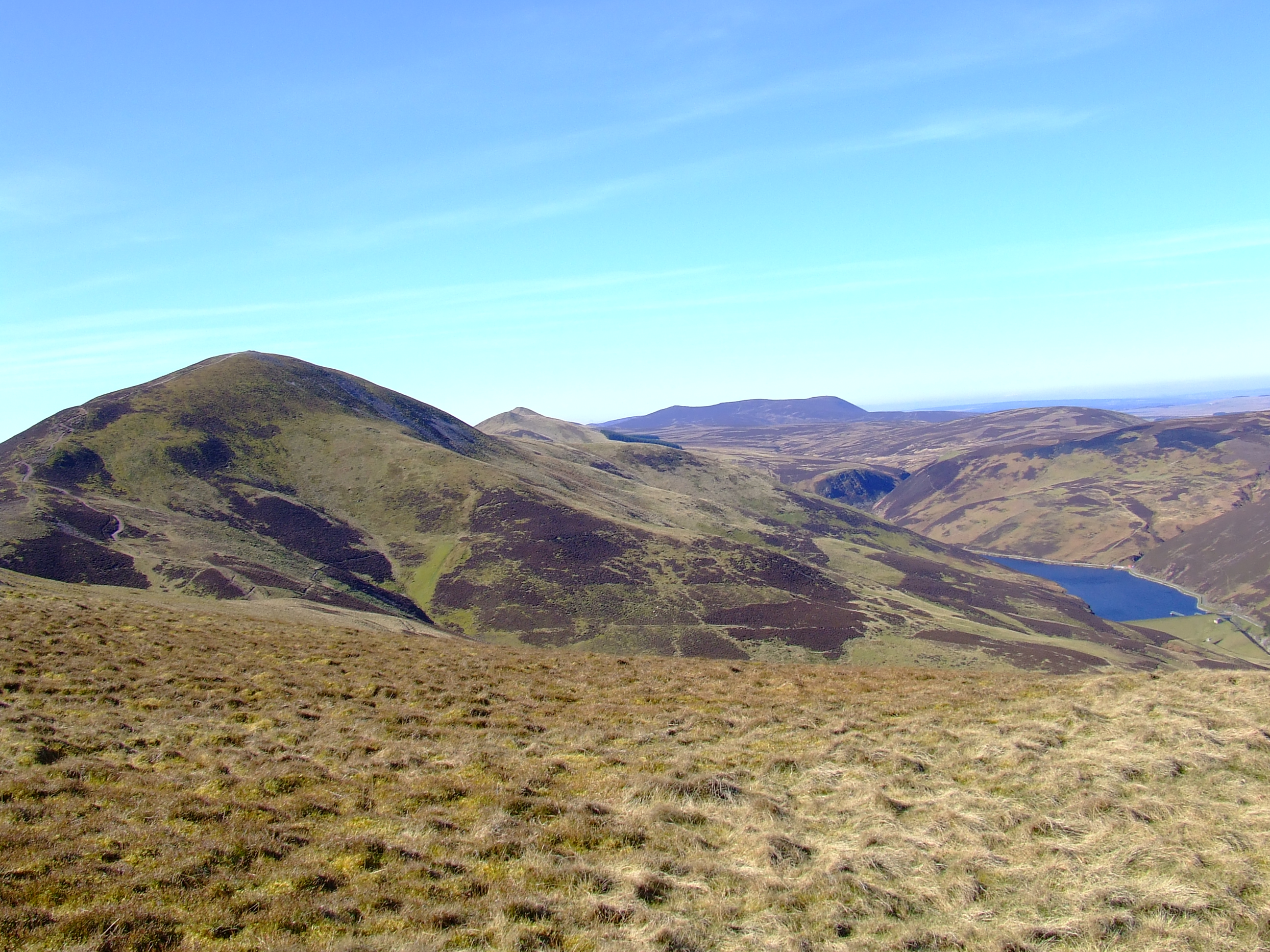
Pentland Hills

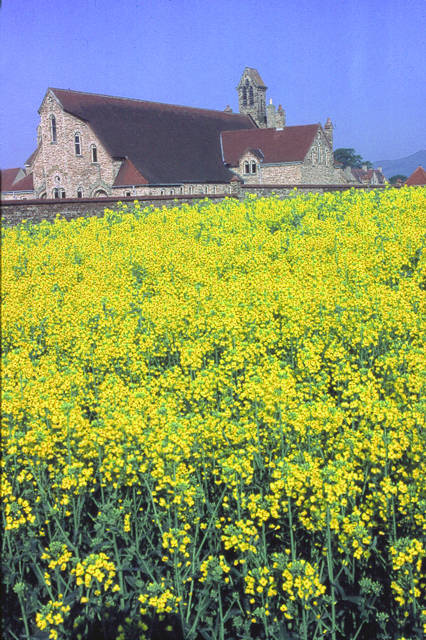
Rosewell Church

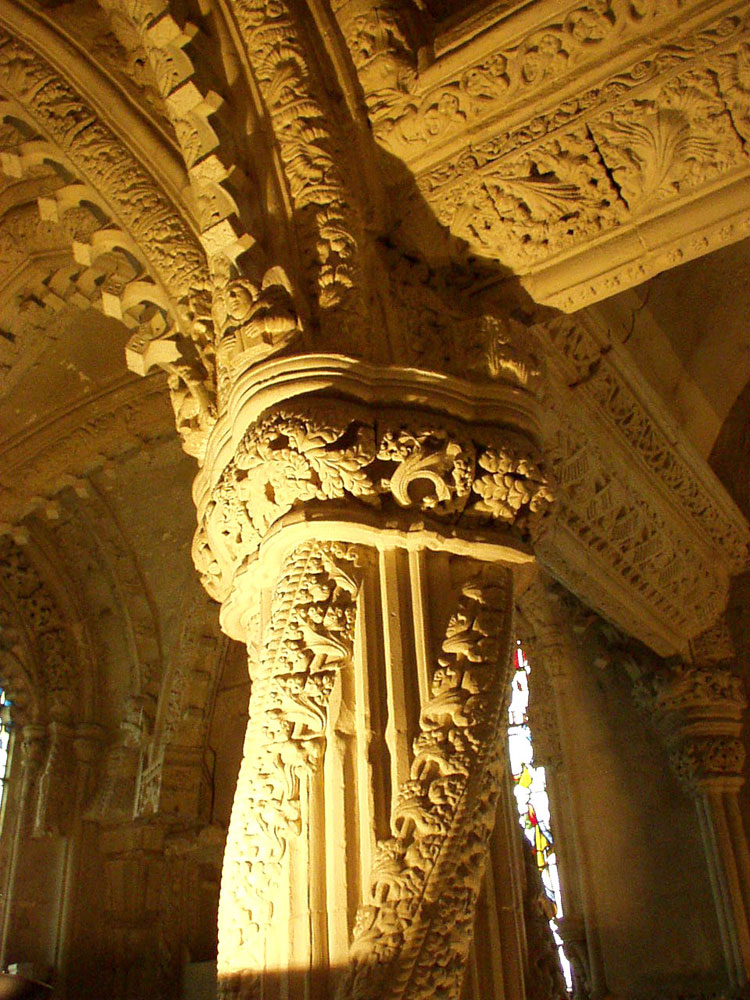
Rosslyn Chapel, Apprentice column

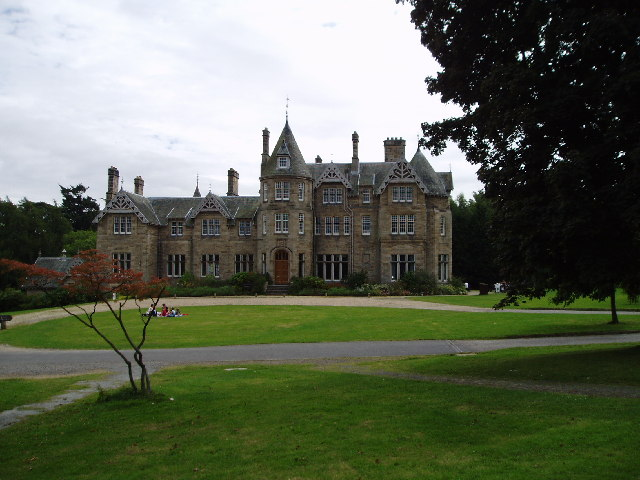
Vogrie House

== See also ==
- List of places in Scotland
