= Cranston, Midlothian =

Coordinates: 55.8792°N 2.9860°W

Cranston: Scottish Gaelic: Baile Chranstain
- Location within Midlothian
- Population: 601
- OS grid reference: NT3840865561
- Council area: Midlothian
- Lieutenancy area: Midlothian
- Country: Scotland
- Sovereign state: United Kingdom
- Post town: Pathhead
- Postcode district: EH37
- Dialling code: 01875
- Police: Scotland
- Fire: Scottish
- Ambulance: Scottish
- UK Parliament: Midlothian
- Scottish Parliament: Midlothian North and Musselburgh

Cranston is a parish of Midlothian, Scotland, lying 4 1/4 miles (6.8 kilometres) south-east of Dalkeith. It is bounded by the parishes of Inveresk and Ormiston (East Lothian) on the east, by Crichton and Borthwick on the south; and by Newbattle on the west and north. The River Tyne flows through the centre of the parish.

The parish is in the northern part of the Tynewater Community Council area and includes the villages of Edgehead, Pathhead, Midlothian and Ford, and the mansions of Oxenfoord Castle and Preston Hall. In a northern salient of the parish, almost detached from the rest, lies the village of Cousland. The chapelry of Cousland was annexed to Cranston about the time of the Reformation.

In the 12th century Cranston was divided into two baronies, Upper Cranston and Nether Cranston, which were later known as New Cranston and Cranston Ridel, respectively. The church stands at Nether Cranston, which was the larger of the two baronies. This district was granted to Hugh Ridel from whom it obtained the name.

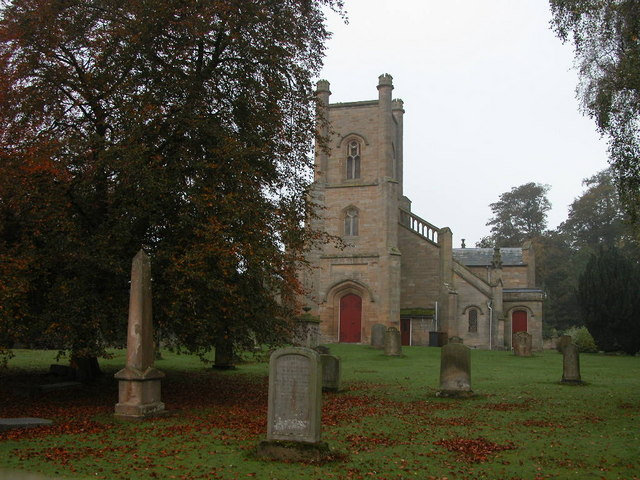
Cranston parish church

The parish church was built at the expense of General Sir John Dalrymple, of Oxenfoord, replacing the previous church which was in the old burial grounds south of Oxenfoord Castle's gardens. The old church had been damaged by fire in 1796 and rebuilt in 1798, but was finally replaced by the new building in 1824. The present church was damaged by fire in 1861, but was quickly repaired and enlarged. The manse, which was re-sited from beside the Lion's Gate of Prestonhall House in 1835, has now been sold as a private house.

A Parochial Board was established under the Poor Law (Scotland) Act 1845. With the Local Government (Scotland) Act 1894 the Parish Council was established, which continued until 1930 when parish councils in Scotland were abolished. Civil parishes persist for census and other non-administrative purposes.

The civil parish has a population of 601 (in 2011).

== Notable residents ==
- Rev Walter Fisher FRSE (1749-1828), minister of Cranston
