= Dewartown =

Coordinates: 55.866°N 2.995°W

Dewartown: Scottish Gaelic: Baile nan Deòireach
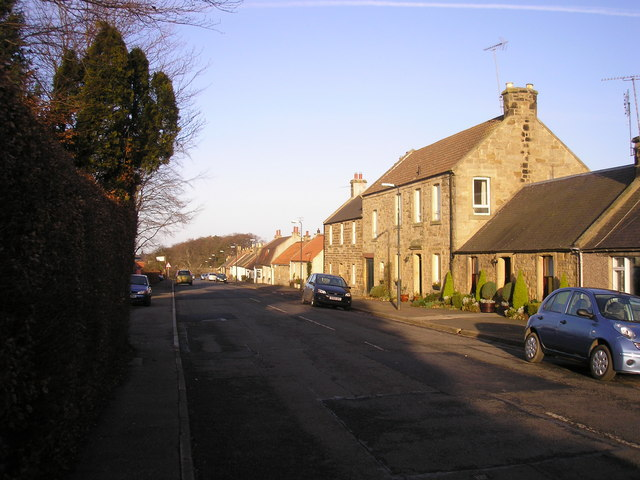
- The road through Dewartown

- Location within Midlothian
- OS grid reference: NT377640
- Council area: Midlothian
- Lieutenancy area: Midlothian
- Country: Scotland
- Sovereign state: United Kingdom
- Post town: GOREBRIDGE
- Postcode district: EH23
- Dialling code: 01875
- Police: Scotland
- Fire: Scottish
- Ambulance: Scottish
- UK Parliament: Midlothian
- Scottish Parliament: Midlothian North and Musselburgh

Dewartown is a small hamlet in Midlothian, Scotland (near Pathhead and Mayfield).

Its name relates to the Dewar family who owned the nearby Vogrie House and Estate which is now in Vogrie Country Park. The village is reputed to have had five public houses during the 19th century, providing for the many farm workers, miners and house staff from the local community. Dewartown is still not listed on many maps, despite the fact a number of the cottages date back to the early 18th century.

Signs erected in the late 1990s depicted the village as 'Dewarton', rather than 'Dewartown'. These were replaced with the latter spelling, despite the fact both spellings are competent, the former being a regional contraction, vis 'ton' meaning 'town'.

== See also ==
- List of places in Midlothian
