= Whitehill, Midlothian =

Coordinates: 55.887°N 3.033°W

Whitehill
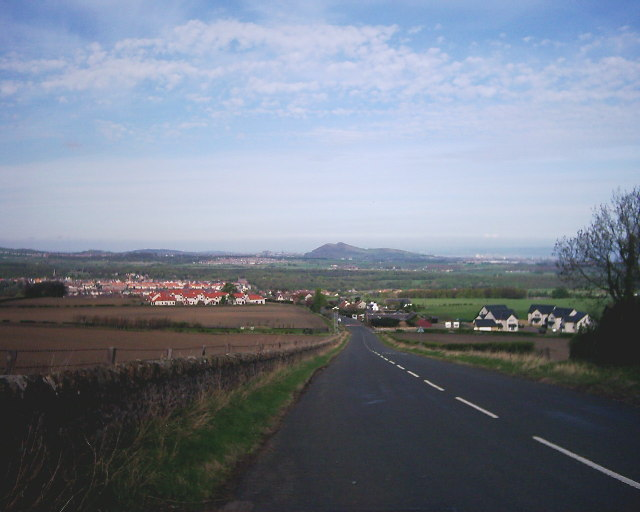
- Whitehill from the southeast

- Location within Midlothian
- Population: 153 (2011 census)
- OS grid reference: NT 35462 66504
- Council area: Midlothian
- Lieutenancy area: Midlothian
- Country: Scotland
- Sovereign state: United Kingdom
- Post town: DALKEITH
- Postcode district: EH22
- Dialling code: 0131 663
- Police: Scotland
- Fire: Scottish
- Ambulance: Scottish
- UK Parliament: Midlothian
- Scottish Parliament: Midlothian North and Musselburgh

Whitehill (/ˈhwaɪtˌhɪl/) is a village in Midlothian in the south-east of Scotland, approximately 1.5 miles (2 km) south-east of Dalkeith and 8.5 miles (13.6 km) from Edinburgh. The village is situated on the northwest slope of the Mayfield-Tranent ridge which spans the border between Midlothian and East Lothian. Both road entrances to the village offer magnificent panoramic views over Edinburgh, the Firth of Forth and the Pentland Hills.

== Etymology ==
The name of the village comes from the name of the farmstead situated near to the entrance/exit of the village towards Edgehead. The name of the farm may have been derived from the definition of unploughed arable farmland as being 'white' or from the definition of hill land that is covered with bent grass (rather than bracken or heather) as being 'white'. Snow can fall and accumulate during the winter months and, as the village is at higher elevation than the Esk valley, this could also be the origin of the name.

== History ==
Whitehill is located on Dere Street, an ancient Roman road that linked the fort at Cramond to York. Part of this road are visible further down the A68 at Soutra. Map records from 1821 show that the village grew from individual houses/buildings at Wet Holm and Whitehill. Farming and mining increased the population of the village during the agricultural and industrial revolutions with map records from 1892 showing the village was then home to both a school and a blacksmith.

To the northwest of Whitehill is the former Dalkeith Fever Hospital, erected in 1912 on land gifted to the town of Dalkeith by the Duke of Buccleuch, which is now part of a small industrial estate.

During their service in World War I four young men from the village were killed. Corporal Arthur Neil Simpson, 22, of the King's Regiment (Liverpool) was killed in action on the 16th of June 1915 most likely as part of the 1/10th Battalion at Bellewaarde. Private William Robert Watson of the Black Watch (Royal Highlanders) died from wounds received in action on the 30th of July 1916 possibly in the aftermath of the Battle of Delville Wood. Private John Ferguson Macrae Pringle, 21, of the Cameron Highlanders was killed in action on the 15th of September 1916 most likely at the Battle of Flers–Courcelette as part of the Battle of the Somme. Private Samuel Brown Smith, 22, of the Royal Scots died on the 16th of August 1917 most likely on the first day of the Battle of Langemarck.

In 2010 the village was in the news due to a police raid on a property which housed one of the largest cannabis farms discovered in the Lothians. Officers found approximately 1,000 plants with an estimated value of around £500,000.

In 2013 representations to the Midlothian Local Development Plan consultation, Lord Ralph Kerr, landowner of fields surrounding the village, brought forward proposals for twelve terraced houses to be built on the farmland adjacent to the village. Midlothian Council's response cited the existing allocation of housing being sufficient to meet requirements, the relatively poor public transport provision, lack of facilities, poor access to schools, the demarcation of the proposed site as being prime agricultural land and the negative impact such a development would have on the landscape.

== Administration ==
The village is in the Midlothian constituency for elections to the House of Commons, the Midlothian North & Musselburgh constituency for elections to the Scottish Parliament and the Midlothian East electoral ward for local council elections. The people in the village are represented by the Dalkeith & District Community Council apart from residents of the Witholm cul-de-sac which is in the Mayfield & Easthouses Community Council boundary area.

== Transport ==
The village used to be on the main route from Edinburgh to Jedburgh, though after the construction of the road bridge designed by Thomas Telford across Tyne Water near Pathhead in 1831, the preferred route shifted to the northeast. The bus service between Edinburgh and Jedburgh still passes through the village. An hourly service run by Borders Buses links the village with Edinburgh, via Dalkeith. The trip takes around 43 minutes. The number 51 continues south to Jedburgh whilst the 52 continues south to Kelso.

During westerly operations at Edinburgh Airport the village is below the flightpath for arrivals from the south, though aircraft are at an altitude of over 4,000 ft so have limited noise impact on residents.

== Sport ==
Despite sharing a name and being in the same area there is no direct link between the village and nearby football club, Whitehill Welfare F.C.

== See also ==
- List of places in Midlothian
- Photographs of Whitehill
