= Fala, Midlothian =

Coordinates: 55.834°N 2.884°W

Fala
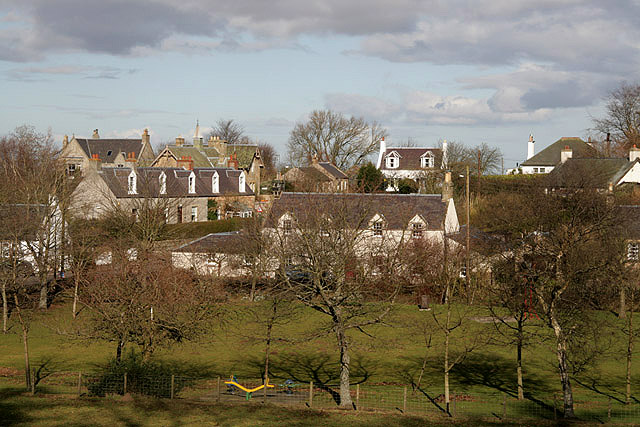

- Location within Midlothian
- OS grid reference: NT446603
- Council area: Midlothian
- Lieutenancy area: Midlothian
- Country: Scotland
- Sovereign state: United Kingdom
- Post town: PATHHEAD
- Postcode district: EH37
- Dialling code: 01875
- Police: Scotland
- Fire: Scottish
- Ambulance: Scottish
- UK Parliament: Midlothian
- Scottish Parliament: Midlothian North and Musselburgh

Fala is a hamlet in the south-eastern corner of Midlothian, Scotland, about 15 miles from Edinburgh.

== Location ==
The parish of the same name is about five miles long from east to west, and one mile broad from north to south, and contains about 3,120 acres (12.6 km^{2}). It is bounded by the following parishes: Humbie to the east, Soutra (to which it is now conjoined) on the south, Heriot & Stow on the west, and on the north by the detached parts of Borthwick, Cranstoun, and Crichton. Fala Hall Burn rises in the moor to the south of Fala Flow and forms the boundary between Fala and Soutra parishes. The streams eventually run into the Cakemuir Burn above Costerton. Due to its location, the village, and more so Fala Dam due to its topography, can often get cut off from the outside world during heavy snowfalls, with residents known to be snowed in for several days.

The hamlet has buildings from the 18th and 19th centuries.

== Highways ==
In 1834 a road (today the A68), with a still extant Toll House at Fala, was constructed between Edinburgh and Lauder and it bisects the parish, marking off the cultivated lands to the east from the pastures to the west. To the west of this highway can be traced the King's Road, which is said to have been made by King Malcolm IV to cross the Lammermuirs to Lauderdale. Dere Street, the Roman road, can be traced at various places on the hills towards Channelkirk to the south west of the A68.

James VI was riding to Lauder and Thirlestane Castle from Edinburgh on 12 October 1593 and at Fala the Earls of Angus, Huntly, and Errol, with Sir James Chisholm appeared suddenly and dismounted and knelt before him.

== Dam ==
The location of the dam at Fala Dam is unknown, but is believed to refer to a construction dating possibly from the Middle Ages. The location of the Dam House to the west of the hamlet shows no evidence for the location of the dam and it is uncertain how it would relate to the mill.

== Church ==
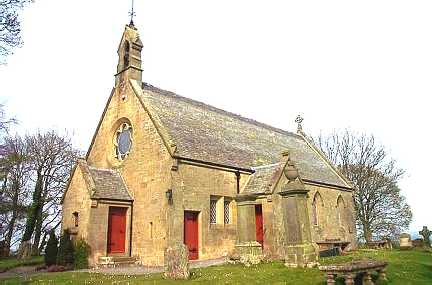
The Parish Church of Fala & Soutra.

In the ancient taxation of 1137, Fala Kirk had to pay, as its proportion, the sum of six merks, and the Rectory of Fala was, like the other churches in Midlothian during the tenth and eleventh centuries, under the diocese of St. Cuthbert. The patronage of Fala, from that time until the 19th century lay with the Lord of the manor or principal laird of the parish. In ancient times there were some Trinity Friars who had charge of a small hospital in connection with Fala Church (not to be confused with Soutra Aisle), as is evidenced by an entry in the Exchequer Rolls of Scotland in 1365. In Forbes's Book on Tithes, he mentions that the Order of the Trinity Friars was appointed and confirmed by Pope Innocent III in 1200. In the time of King James V the Rectory of Fala was taxed at £6, 13s. 4p.

The present parish church is a long 18th century building, with a modest rebuild to an economically Gothicized design by David Bryce in 1863. The Manse of 1792 also survives.

The school and connected school house of circa 1840 was extended in 1875. However, due to a declining roll, the primary school eventually closed but the building remains and is now used as a private nursery for children aged 6 months to 5 years. Children of primary school age are accommodated at the nearby Pathhead Primary School. Secondary school education is provided at Dalkeith High School.
