= Edgehead =

Coordinates: 55.874°N 3.002°W

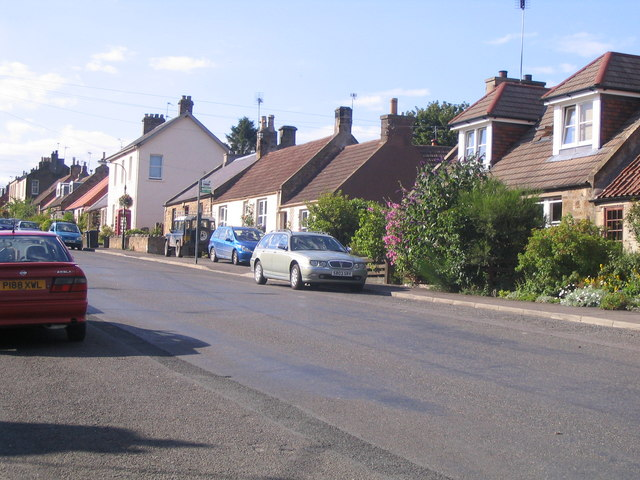
- Village of Edgehead

- Location within Midlothian
- Population: 115 (2008)
- OS grid reference: NT373650
- Council area: Midlothian
- Shire county: Midlothian
- Country: Scotland
- Sovereign state: United Kingdom
- Post town: Pathhead
- Postcode district: EH37
- Dialling code: 01875
- Police: Scotland
- Fire: Scottish
- Ambulance: Scottish
- UK Parliament: Midlothian
- Scottish Parliament: Midlothian North and Musselburgh

Edgehead, also known as Chesterhill, is a hamlet in Midlothian, Scotland.

== Location ==
Edgehead is situated east of Dewartown and Mayfield, north-west of Pathhead and south-east of Dalkeith. Two areas of woodland, Windmill Wood and Chesterhill Wood, are located beside the northern end of the village.

== History ==
The village developed along the long straight Roman road Dere Street, and remains linear in nature. It expanded in the 19th century when a coal mine was opened in Windmill Woods. The village once contained four shops supplying both residents and local farms. It was designated a conservation area by Midlothian Council in 1982, and redesignated following a review in 1996. The population of Edgehead was 115 in August 2008.

=== Edgehead Colliery ===
Edgehead Colliery was a coal mine located in Windmill Woods in the 19th and 20th century. It was initially owned by the Earl of Stair. Around 1930 ownership transferred to the Fordel Mains (Midlothian) Colliery Company, and it became part of the National Coal Board in 1949 and was closed in 1959. In 1842 the mine employed 127 workers; by 1959 this had fallen to 40.

== Facilities ==
Edgehead has no local shops as of 2010. A small park and children's play area is located near the top of the village. A telephone box and letter box are found near the top of the village.

Cranston Primary School was located at the south of the village. In 2004 it had 57 pupils. However it has since been closed following the opening of a number of new primary schools in Midlothian and the site sold for redevelopment.

== Historic buildings ==
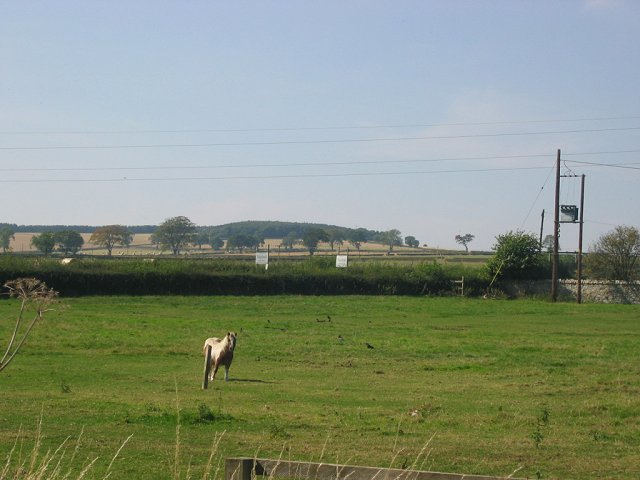
Nearby fields

Edgehead contains three listed buildings:

- The Old Windmill, one of very few remaining 18th-century windmills in Scotland, was converted for residential use in the 19th century and has been category B listed since January 1971.
- Edgehead Farmhouse is an early 19th-century two-storey building located to the north of the village. Although the farm is still in use, the house is no longer lived in. It has been category C(s) listed since February 2003.
- Edgehead Lodge, a mid-19th-century sandstone construction initially part of the estate of nearby Oxenfoord Castle, was category C(s) listed at the same time as Edgehead Farmhouse.

== Transport ==
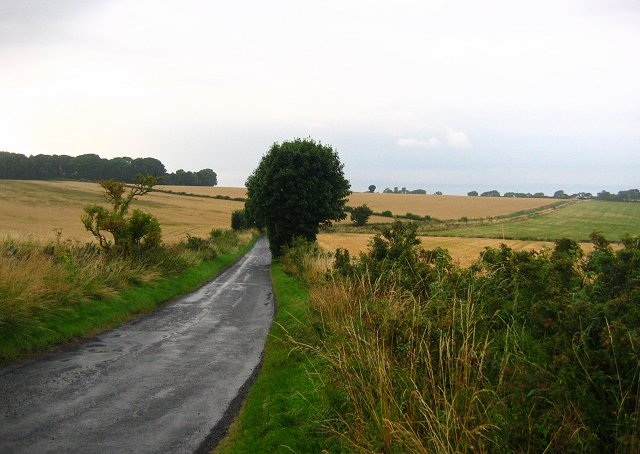
Lane

Edgehead is located on a minor road which runs from Pathhead to join an unnumbered road north of Whitehill which leads to Dalkeith. The road into Dalkeith previously formed part of the trunk A68 road, but was bypassed in September 2008 to relieve traffic congestion in Dalkeith town centre. There is some evidence from 17th-century maps to suggest that the road through Edgehead was part of the main route between Edinburgh and Lauder now part of the A68. It was originally part of the Roman road Dere Street, which ran from York to Cramond.

The village is served by Borders Buses bus routes 51 (Edinburgh-Jedburgh) and 52 (Edinburgh-Kelso), which combine to provide an hourly service in each direction Monday to Saturday daytimes.

== See also ==
- List of places in Midlothian
