= Birkenside, Midlothian =

Coordinates: 55.8363°N 03.0475°W

Birkenside
- Location within Midlothian
- OS grid reference: NT344608
- Council area: Midlothian
- Lieutenancy area: Midlothian
- Country: Scotland
- Sovereign state: United Kingdom
- Postcode district: EH23
- Police: Scotland
- Fire: Scottish
- Ambulance: Scottish
- UK Parliament: Midlothian
- Scottish Parliament: Midlothian South, Tweeddale and Lauderdale

Birkenside is a village, adjacent to the A7 road, at the south of Gorebridge in Midlothian, Scotland.

== See also ==
- List of places in Midlothian
- List of places in Scotland
