= Loganlea Reservoir =

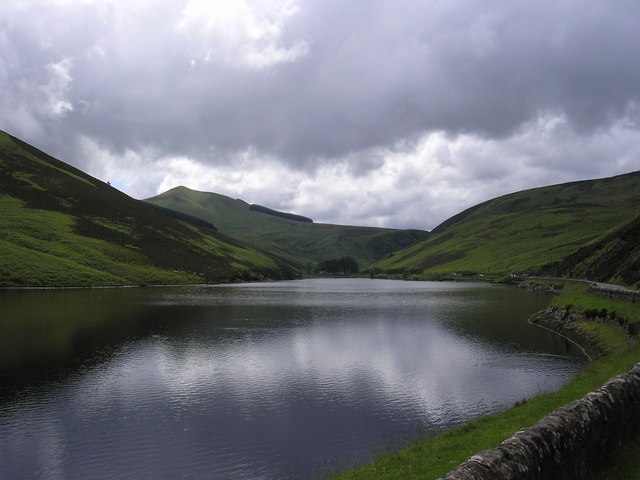
- View along the reservoir

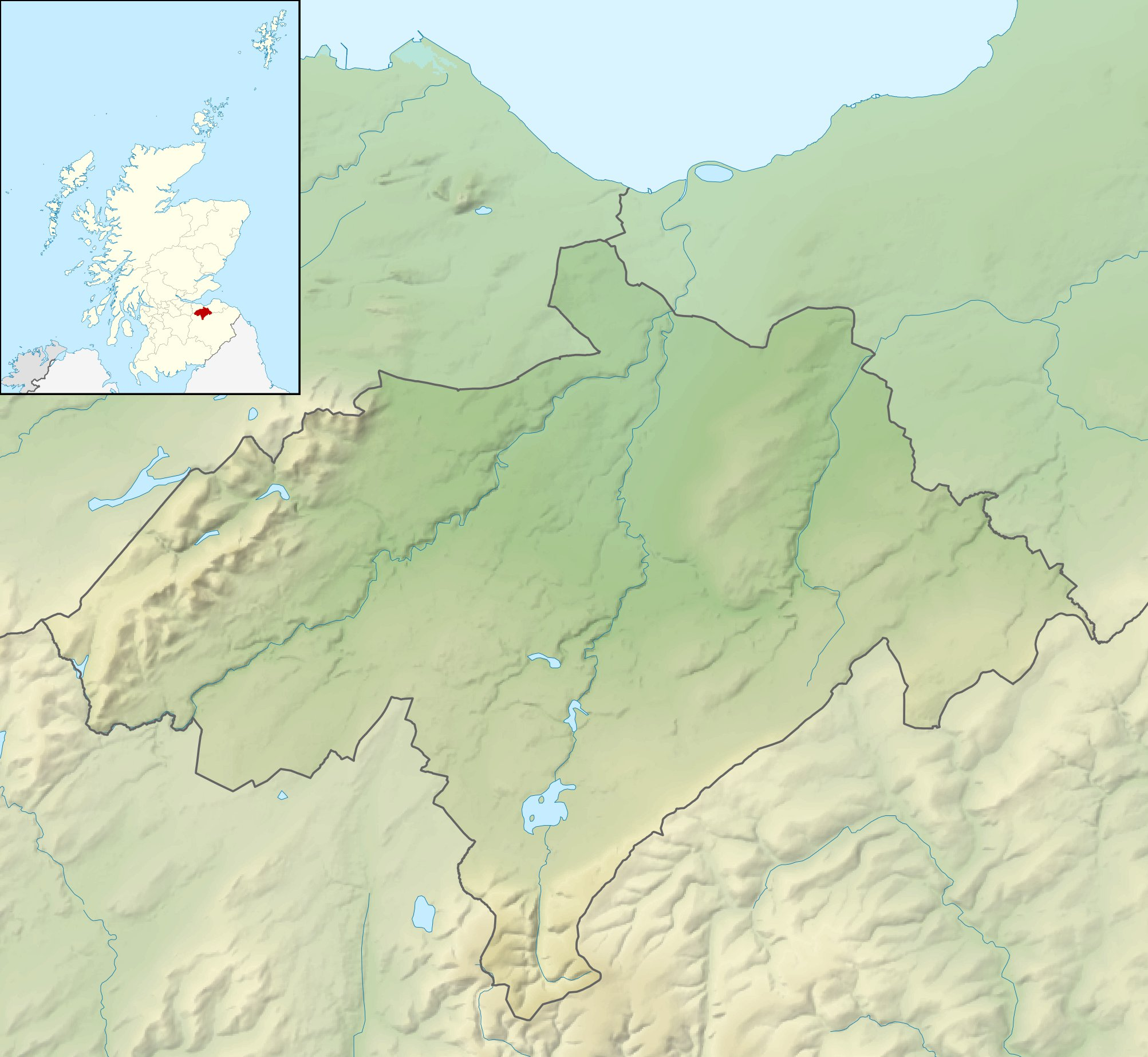
- Location within Midlothian
- Location: Pentland Hills, Midlothian, Scotland
- Coordinates: 55°50′53″N 3°17′15″W
- Type: reservoir
- Basin countries: United Kingdom

Loganlea Reservoir is a small reservoir in the Pentland Hills, Midlothian, Scotland, UK. The Logan Burn connects the reservoir with Glencorse Reservoir.

== History ==
The reservoir was constructed by the Edinburgh Water Company under the provisions of an Act of Parliament obtained in 1847, and was completed in 1851. The containing dam is 59 feet (18 m) high, and the reservoir holds around 118 million imperial gallons (540 Ml) of water.

== Bibliography ==
- Binnie, G M (1981). Early Victorian Water Engineers. Thomas Telford. ISBN 978-0-7277-0128-2.

== See also ==
- List of places in Midlothian
