= Easter Howgate =

Coordinates: 55.863°N 3.214°W

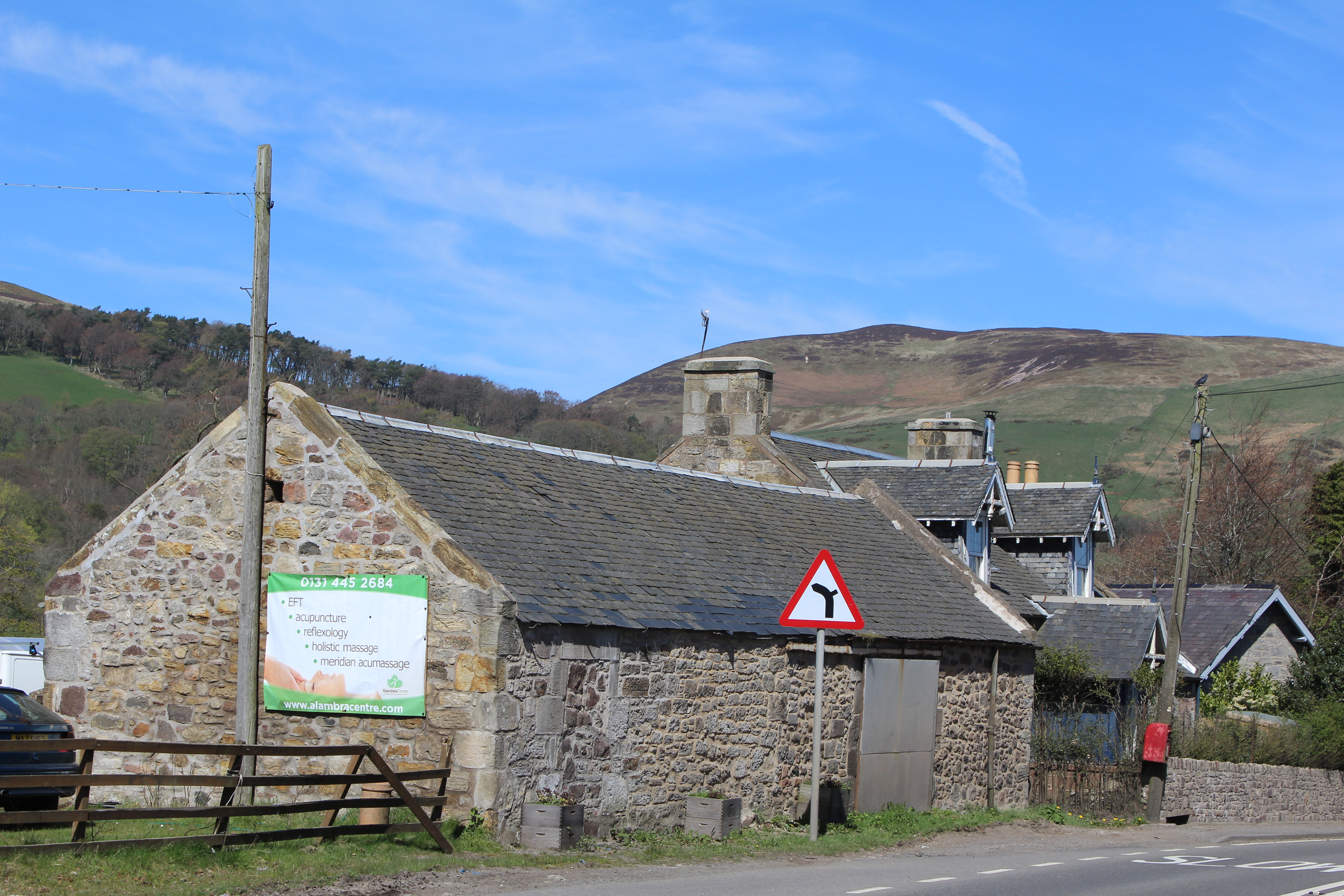
- Farm building & cottage at Easter Howgate

- Location within Midlothian
- OS grid reference: NT240639
- Council area: Midlothian
- Lieutenancy area: Midlothian
- Country: Scotland
- Sovereign state: United Kingdom
- Post town: PENICUIK
- Postcode district: EH26
- Dialling code: 01968
- Police: Scotland
- Fire: Scottish
- Ambulance: Scottish
- UK Parliament: Midlothian
- Scottish Parliament: Midlothian North and Musselburgh

Easter Howgate is a settlement in Midlothian, Scotland, UK, on the A702, two miles north of Penicuik.

The Scottish Agricultural College maintains a teaching campus and a research farm there, named "Edinburgh Genetics".

== See also ==
- List of places in Midlothian
