= Newbattle =

Village in Midlothian, Scotland

Coordinates: 55.883°N 3.071°W

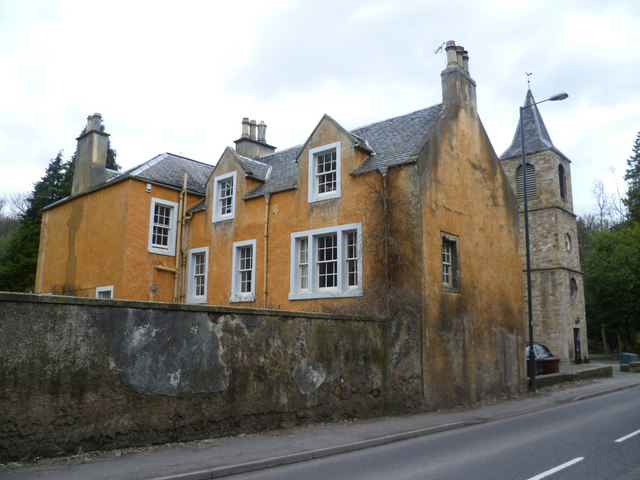
- The manse and kirk of Newbattle

- Location within Midlothian
- Population: 560 (2020)
- OS grid reference: NT332642
- Council area: Midlothian
- Lieutenancy area: Midlothian
- Country: Scotland
- Sovereign state: United Kingdom
- Post town: DALKEITH
- Postcode district: EH22 3
- Dialling code: 0131
- Police: Scotland
- Fire: Scottish
- Ambulance: Scottish
- UK Parliament: Midlothian
- Scottish Parliament: Midlothian North and Musselburgh

Newbattle (from Old Scots Neubothle, "new building") is a village and civil parish in Midlothian, Scotland. The village lies south of Dalkeith, about seven miles from Edinburgh. It is notable for containing Newbattle Abbey, a stately home built on the site of a 12th-century Cistercian monastery.

The civil parish, which also includes Newtongrange, had a population of 21,534 in 2011.

== Newbattle Abbey ==
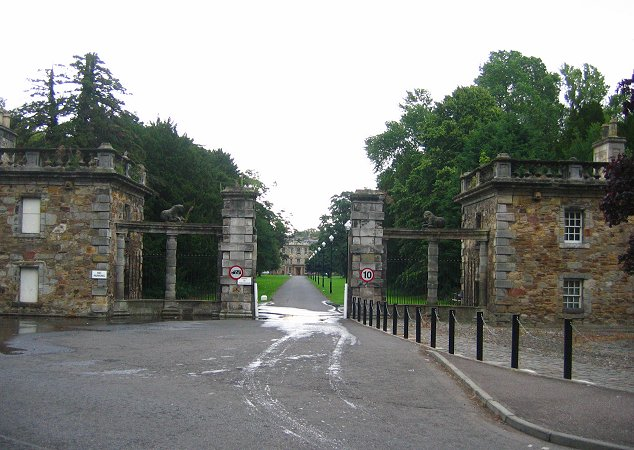
Gates of Newbattle Abbey

Newbattle Abbey was founded in 1140 by monks from Melrose Abbey. The patron was King David I of Scotland (with his son Henry). Its church was dedicated in 1234. The abbey was burned by English royal forces in 1385 and once more in 1544. It became a secular lordship for the last commendator, Mark Kerr (Ker) in 1587.

== Newbattle Church ==
After the Reformation most of the remains of the abbey church were removed and used to build a new church, the proverbial "stone's throw away", so still within the abbey grounds. What resulted was a new independent Newbattle Church that would see traumatic times, as Scotland, in particular, entered the Period of Unsettlement.

Little is known about the Newbattle church built after the Reformation. It was situated somewhere on the other side of Newbattle Road from the present church. While it has always been Protestant, the form of church government has been at different times Presbyterian and Episcopalian. The first permanent minister was Adam Foulis who was translated from Heriot to Newbattle in 1570. He was followed by Robert Wilson in 1573, John Heries in 1583, Alex Ambrose in 1608 and then John Aird in 1615. During John Aird's incumbency, there were between 800 and 900 Communicants within the Parish. The Newbattle Communion Sacrament became such an occasion that it was held in the Churchyard Cemetery. Here a tent was erected and the Welsh Family Table monument was used to dispense not only the Communion but also refreshments after the Service.

Such was the popularity of the Newbattle Communion Sacrament that adjoining Parishes closed on such Sundays and the occasion became known as a Holy Fair. The principle was adopted by local Parishes, resulting in such events as the Dalkeith Fair. The Newbattle Fair became known as the Newbattle Sacrament, a Day of Freedom. The Rev Aird did many things for the Parish, such as implementing Knox's ideal for a Settled School in every Parish, the first Parish School being built in the area close to the site of the present church.

Robert Leighton , who was minister from 1641 to 1653 before becoming Principal of the University of Edinburgh, is still remembered today as a scholar and preacher.

=== The current building ===
In 1720, the building was in such a poor state of repair that the minister, the Rev. Charles Campbell, thought it would possibly fall down. In September 1725, the Marquess of Lothian presented plans for a new church to Dalkeith Presbytery and the heritors (landowners). Edinburgh architect Mr Alexander McGill had drawn up these plans, and, although the project was approved, work did not commence on the new building, and on a clean site, until 1727. The design included making use of material from the old church, where suitable, in the construction. In fact a considerable amount of stonework was transferred, to such an extent that all that remained of the old Church was the crypt, which remained as the burial chamber for the Kerr/Lothian family. The completion year is generally accepted as 1729.

At the beginning of the 18th century, the floor of a church consisted of earth, and, while the laird would erect a loft or seat, the majority of the congregation sat on stools placed upon the earthen floor. Although, in 1739, lofts were erected in the north and south aisles of Newbattle church, it was not until 1750 that seats were purchased and the passageways paved.

The south wall of the church has three traditional style stained glass windows. This wall also supported a gallery and the organ until 1937, when the gallery was removed and the organ re-sited. The large central circular window, depicting the Creation, was designed by Catherine Hamilton, the mother of the Rev. J. Arnott Hamilton, a minister at Newbattle from 1922 to 1952. The window to the left of the circular window, is a memorial to those of the parish who served during World War II. The third window commemorates that Newbattle was the Garrison Church for the Forces personnel, in particular the Royal Army Medical Corps, stationed at the Abbey and the adjoining Camp. An unofficial record of those who gave of their service during the period of the Second World war and beyond, remain written on the walls just inside the door beside the organ. Some stationed here, some recovering from wounds and/or traumas, some from local voluntary organisations.

=== Newbattle Parish Church (post 2003) ===
Newbattle Parish Church remains a parish church of the Church of Scotland. In 2003, the boundaries of the ecclesiastical parish (covering Newbattle, Mayfield, and Easthouses) were extended to include the village of Newtongrange, effectively restoring the original parish borders of several centuries ago. The 18th-century Newbattle church building, together with those within the communities of Newtongrange, Mayfield, and Easthouses, are maintained as centres of worship by the post-2003 Newbattle Parish Church of Scotland. The current minister is the Reverend Sean Swindells.

== See also ==
- Carmyle
- Newbattle Abbey
- Newbattle Community High School
- Newbattle at War- Newbattle Parish in World War I
