= Borthwick =

Coordinates: 55.825°N 3.011°W

Borthwick: Scottish Gaelic: Bordaig; Scots: Borthick
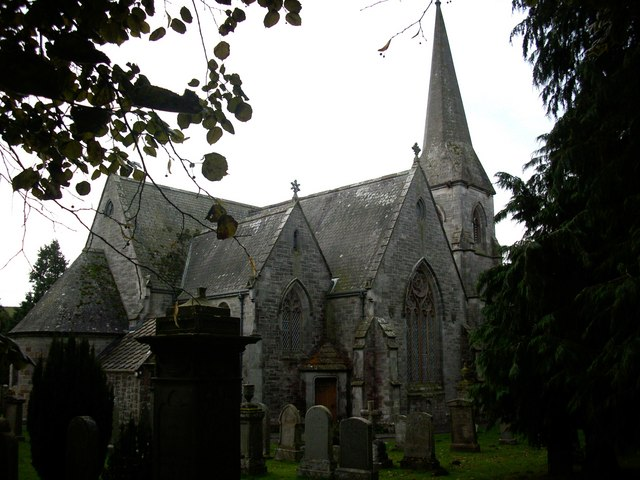
- The 18th century kirk in Borthwick

- Location within Midlothian
- OS grid reference: NT366595
- Council area: Midlothian
- Lieutenancy area: Midlothian
- Country: Scotland
- Sovereign state: United Kingdom
- Post town: GOREBRIDGE
- Postcode district: EH23
- Dialling code: 01875
- Police: Scotland
- Fire: Scottish
- Ambulance: Scottish
- UK Parliament: Midlothian
- Scottish Parliament: Midlothian South, Tweeddale and Lauderdale

Borthwick is a hamlet, parish and stream in Midlothian, Scotland. The parish includes the 15th century Borthwick Castle, which is to the east of the village and the villages of Gorebridge and North Middleton. Nearby is Newtongrange in the parish of Newbattle.

The civil parish has an area of 9375 acres and a population of 2,841 (in 2011).

== Notable residents ==
Very Rev Thomas Turnbull was minister of the parish from 1734 to 1786.

Borthwick was the birthplace of the historian William Robertson.

== See also ==
- List of places in Midlothian
- List of places in Scotland
