= Pittendreich Mill =

Coordinates: 57.634444°N 3.3481736°W

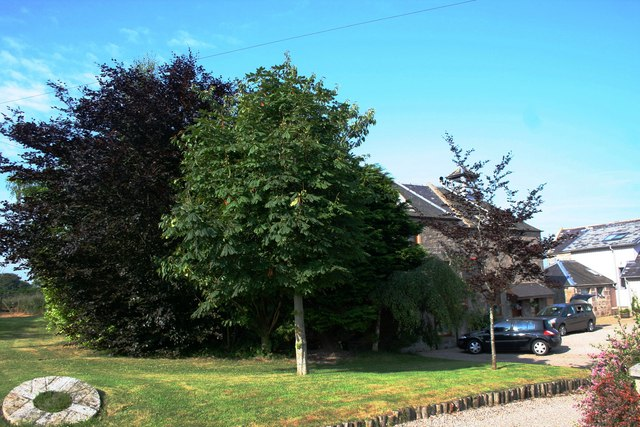
Pittendreich Mill - geograph.org.uk - 1395388

Pittendreich Mill in Elgin, Scotland, was built around 1830 by Moray Estates with parts stemming from the early 19th century, and designed to handle meal, flour and barley.

Milling is known to have been carried out in the area as early as 1200. An earlier mill was erected between 1444 and 1445 by the priory of Pluscarden, leading to a dispute with James Douglas who had received Pittendreich from King James III in a feu charter of 1469. This later led to James Douglas joining an attack on Dean Alexander Dunbar in the chanonry of Elgin in which the dean was badly wounded and his thirteen-year-old daughter, killed.

Pittendreich Mill was powered by water from the Black Burn until the early 1900s when it was converted to oil. Later conversions included electricity. The mill would process meal, flour, and barley, with a kiln used to dry oats which would then be milled into oatmeal. The mill closed in the 1930s

After several years of disuse, the mill was converted into a home in 1976. The kiln now served as a chimney, with one mill-stone acting as a lounge feature and the other embedded in a grassy bank outside the property. More recently, the property was offered for sale in December 2006 and again in September 2017.
