= Easthouses =

Coordinates: 55.879°N 3.049°W

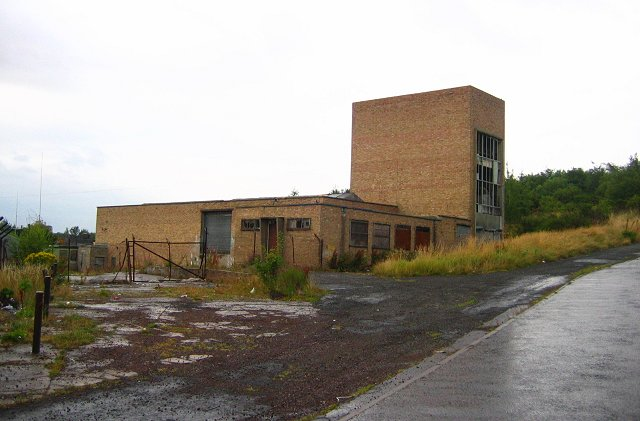
- Derelict industrial building on former colliery land

- Location within Midlothian
- OS grid reference: NT344655
- Council area: Midlothian
- Lieutenancy area: Midlothian
- Country: Scotland
- Sovereign state: United Kingdom
- Post town: DALKEITH
- Postcode district: EH22 4
- Dialling code: 0131
- Police: Scotland
- Fire: Scottish
- Ambulance: Scottish
- UK Parliament: Midlothian
- Scottish Parliament: Midlothian North and Musselburgh

Easthouses is a settlement in Midlothian, Scotland, lying to the east of Newtongrange and south of Dalkeith. It forms the northern extension of the settlement of Mayfield, with which it is closely associated; the two communities have a combined population of around 7,900.

Primarily based on public housing, Easthouses developed in the 1920s to accommodate miners for the nearby Easthouses Colliery, many of whom relocated from the west of Scotland. The settlement was significantly extended in the 1950s. Employment has diversified since the closure of local mines, with many of the population now commuting to Edinburgh.

The Easthouses Parish Church (built 1954) is of minor architectural interest.

== See also ==
- Newbattle Community High School
- Easthouses Lily Miners Welfare F.C.
- Murder of Jodi Jones
