= Preston Hall, Midlothian =

Stately home in Midlothian, Scotland

Preston Hall
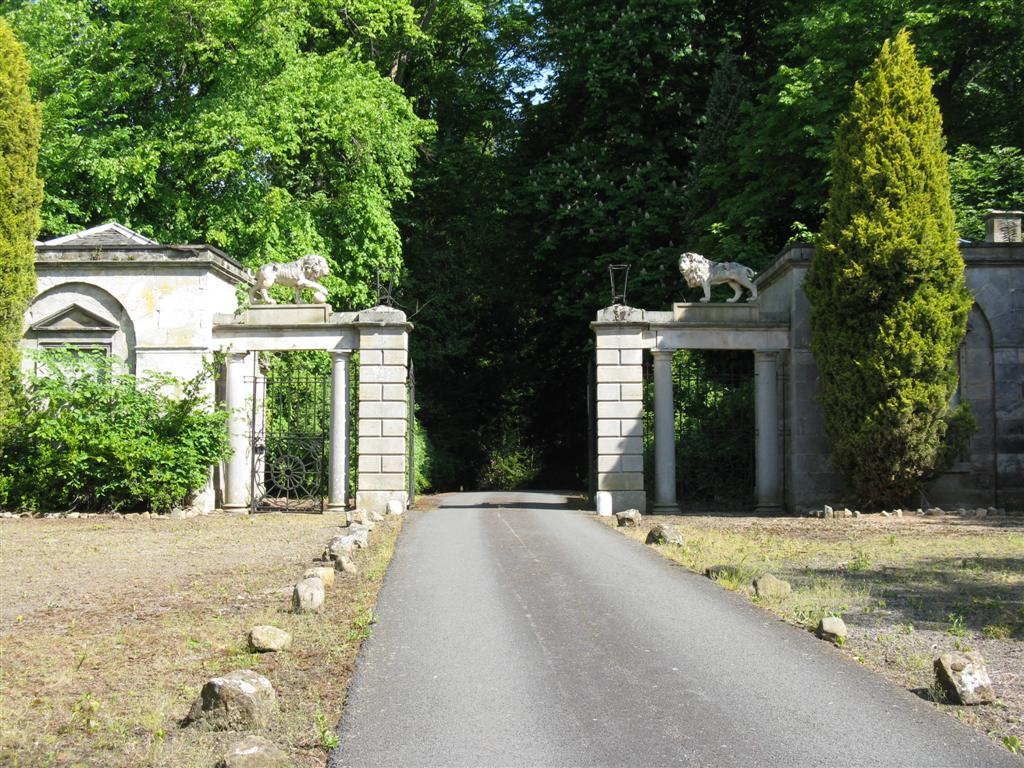
- Lions Lodge gatehouse, Preston Hall

- Location within Midlothian
- 55°52′52″N 2°58′11″W
- Location: near Pathhead, Midlothian, Scotland; GB grid reference NT394657

History
- Built: 1792–1801
- Built for: Alexander Callander

Site notes
- Area: 165 hectares (410 acres)
- Architect: Robert Mitchell

Listed Building – Category A
- Official name: Preston Hall
- Designated: 22 January 1971
- Reference no.: LB775

Inventory of Gardens and Designed Landscapes in Scotland
- Official name: Prestonhall
- Designated: 30 June 1987
- Reference no.: GDL00320

Preston Hall, or Prestonhall, is a late-18th-century mansion in Midlothian, to the south of Edinburgh, Scotland. It is located 1.5 kilometres (0.93 mi) north of Pathhead on the east side of the Tyne Water, opposite Oxenfoord Castle on the west side.

The first Preston Hall was built c.1700 and was the home to Sir John Preston 4th baronet. In 1738 William Adam extended the property for the Dowager Duchess of Gordon and it was later home to her son General Lord Adam Gordon. The present house, and several estate buildings, are the work of architect Robert Mitchell (fl. 1770–1809). These are protected as Category A listed buildings, the highest level of protection for a historic building in Scotland.

== History ==
A house was built here in 1700 for Roderick Mackenzie, brother of the Earl of Cromartie, who became a law lord as Lord Prestonhall in 1703. In 1738 the estate was bought by Henrietta, the widow of Alexander Gordon, 2nd Duke of Gordon, and additions were made to the house in 1740 by William Adam. Lady Gordon laid out the extensive parkland around the house before her death in 1760, after which work on the estate was continued by her son Lord Adam Gordon.

In 1789, Preston Hall was purchased by Alexander Callander. Callander had made his fortune in India, and had already purchased the nearby estates of Crichton and Elphinstone. He found the house to be in poor condition, and it was demolished shortly after. Callander hired London-based architect Robert Mitchell to design a replacement house, and the foundation stone was laid on 18 March 1791. Alexander Callander died the following year, and the house was completed by his brother John (later Sir John Callander, Bt.) in 1800.

In 1812 the house passed to John Callander's nephew John Alexander Higgins, who left it to his nephew William Burn-Callander FRSE (1792–1854) in 1828. Alterations made to the house in the early 19th century included the reversal of the front and rear elevations, and further development of the grounds. A porch was added by David Bryce in around 1850. The Callander family continue to own Prestonhall.

== Architecture ==
The house is considered to be Robert Mitchell's most important architectural work. Mitchell was born in Aberdeen but practised in London from 1782. Moore Place, Hertfordshire, and Nelson's Column, Montreal, are among his few other surviving works.

The front facade of Preston Hall has been compared to an illustration in the 1728 Essay in the Defence of Ancient Architecture by Robert Morris, and was considered somewhat dated at the time of its construction. The rear is more neoclassical in style, comprising a large central block flanked by pavilions. The pavilions may predate the main building, possibly being part of William Adam's scheme, albeit remodelled by Mitchell. Significant features of the interior include four life-size female figures in the stairway, which are made from Coade stone, a type of ceramic used as an artificial stone.

== Estate ==
The North Gate into the grounds also survives from the earlier phase, and dates from around 1740. The remainder of the estate buildings were designed by Robert Mitchell and built in the 1790s. At the end of a tree-lined vista to the north of the house is the octagonal-plan Temple, originally intended as Alexander Callander's mausoleum. The south entrance to the grounds is known as the Lion Gate, as the gate piers are topped by lion statues made from Coade stone. The walled garden includes two brick gazebos, which served as viewing platforms. In 1842, 40 varieties of fig were being cultivated in the garden and adjacent hot houses.

The house is protected as a Category A listed building, as are the North Gate, Lion Gate, walled garden, stables, and the Temple. The grounds of the house are listed on the Inventory of Gardens and Designed Landscapes in Scotland, the national listing of historic gardens in Scotland, and is considered to have "outstanding" architectural and scenic value.
