= Carrington, Midlothian =

Coordinates: 55.8328°N 3.0903°W

Carrington
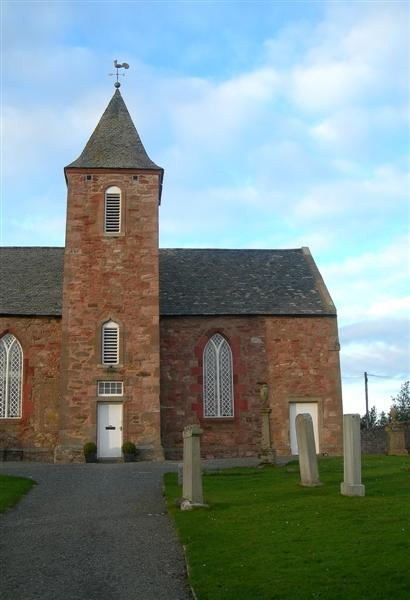
- Carrington Church and graveyard

- Location within Midlothian
- OS grid reference: NT317604
- Council area: Midlothian
- Lieutenancy area: Midlothian
- Country: Scotland
- Sovereign state: United Kingdom
- Post town: GOREBRIDGE
- Postcode district: EH23
- Dialling code: 01875
- Police: Scotland
- Fire: Scottish
- Ambulance: Scottish
- UK Parliament: Midlothian
- Scottish Parliament: Midlothian South, Tweeddale and Lauderdale

Carrington is a small, rural village in Midlothian, Scotland. It is located to the south of Bonnyrigg. The civil parish of the same name has a population of 316 (in 2011).

== Church ==
The former Carrington Parish Church (of the Church of Scotland) was built in 1710–1711. It closed for regular worship in 1975 (and has been converted into business premises). The congregation united with nearby Cockpen Church to form the current Cockpen and Carrington Parish Church.

== Arniston House ==
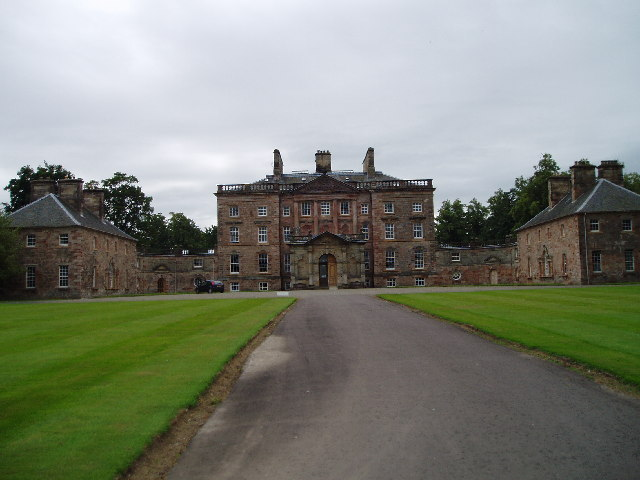
Arniston House

This beautiful mansion just south of Edinburgh has been the home of the Dundas family for over four hundred years. It was designed by William Adam and finished by his son John, brother of the famous Robert Adam.
