= Vogrie House =

Building in Midlothian, Scotland

Coordinates: 55°51′29″N 2°59′28″W

- Interactive map of the Vogrie House area

General information
- Type: House
- Location: Scotland

Design and construction
- Architect: Andrew Heiton

Vogrie House forms the centrepiece of Vogrie Country Park in Midlothian.

It was built for James Dewar and his family in 1876 by Andrew Heiton, the town architect for Perth. Dewar was the creator of Dewar's whisky.

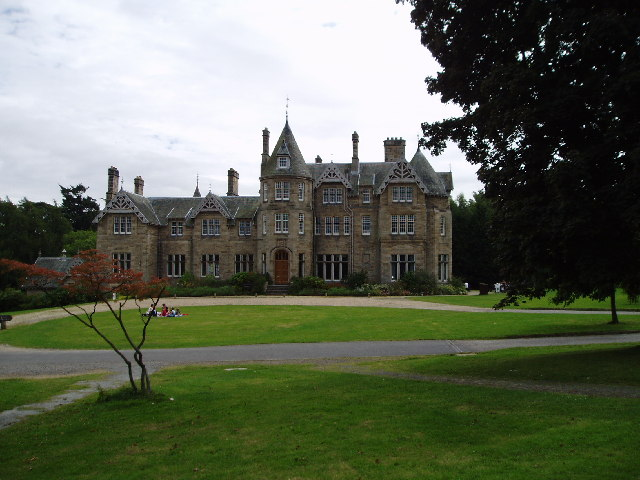
Vogrie House

The current house is an example of Victorian baronial splendour and is said to be one of the best surviving examples of Heiton's work. The house was a typical country house with a library, servants' quarters and many bedrooms.

Transformed in 1926 into a nursing home for the Royal Edinburgh Hospital, by Ernest Auldjo Jamieson the house was sold on to local government in the 1950s and had a role during the Cold War as a control centre for communications.

The park surrounding Vogrie House hosts Vogrie Pogrie Festival, held annually mid September since 2021.

== Early history ==
The lands of Vogrie were included in the marriage contract of James Hepburn, 4th Earl of Bothwell and Jean Gordon in February 1566. At that time Vogrie was the possession of the heirs of Sir Robert Carnegie.

John Lumsden of Blanerne sold the lands of Vogrie to Samuel Cockburn of Templehall and his wife Elizabeth Douglas in 1590. The transaction included the assent of members of the wider Lumsden family, and was witnessed by the Edinburgh merchant Clement Cor, father-in-law of Robert Lumsden of Ardrie.

== See also ==
- List of places in Midlothian
