= Vogrie Country Park =

Country park in Midlothian, Scotland

Coordinates: 55°51′29.92″N 2°59′26.62″W

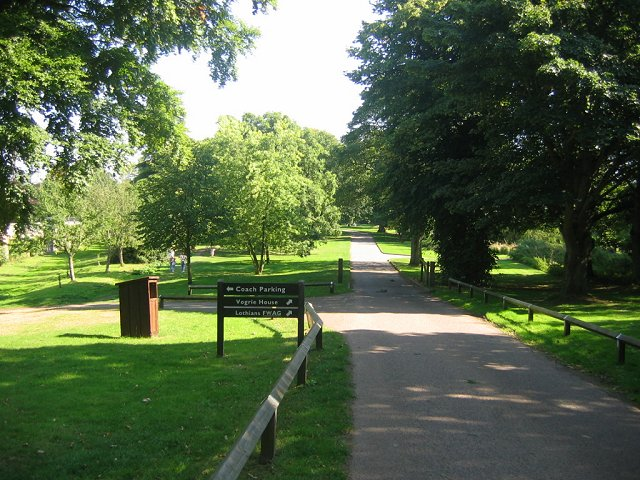

Vogrie Country Park in Scotland is managed by Midlothian Council. It consists of a woodland estate surrounding the Victorian Vogrie House.

It is located around 12 miles (19 km) from Edinburgh between Pathhead and Gorebridge.

Facilities in the parkland include a miniature railway, 9-hole golf course, children's play area and four miles of walks. The miniature railway has a working turntable and teddy bears strategically placed along the route for young children to spot.

The park is the home to Vogrie Pogrie Festival, held annually mid September since 2021.

The River Tyne flows through the park.
