= Glencorse Reservoir =

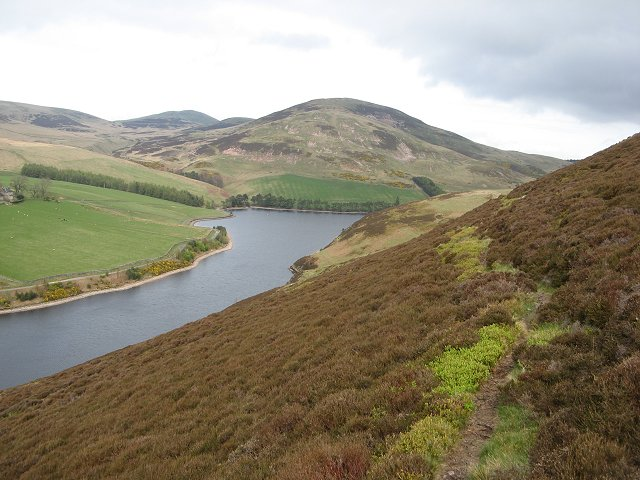
- View of Glencorse Reservoir from Turnhouse Hill

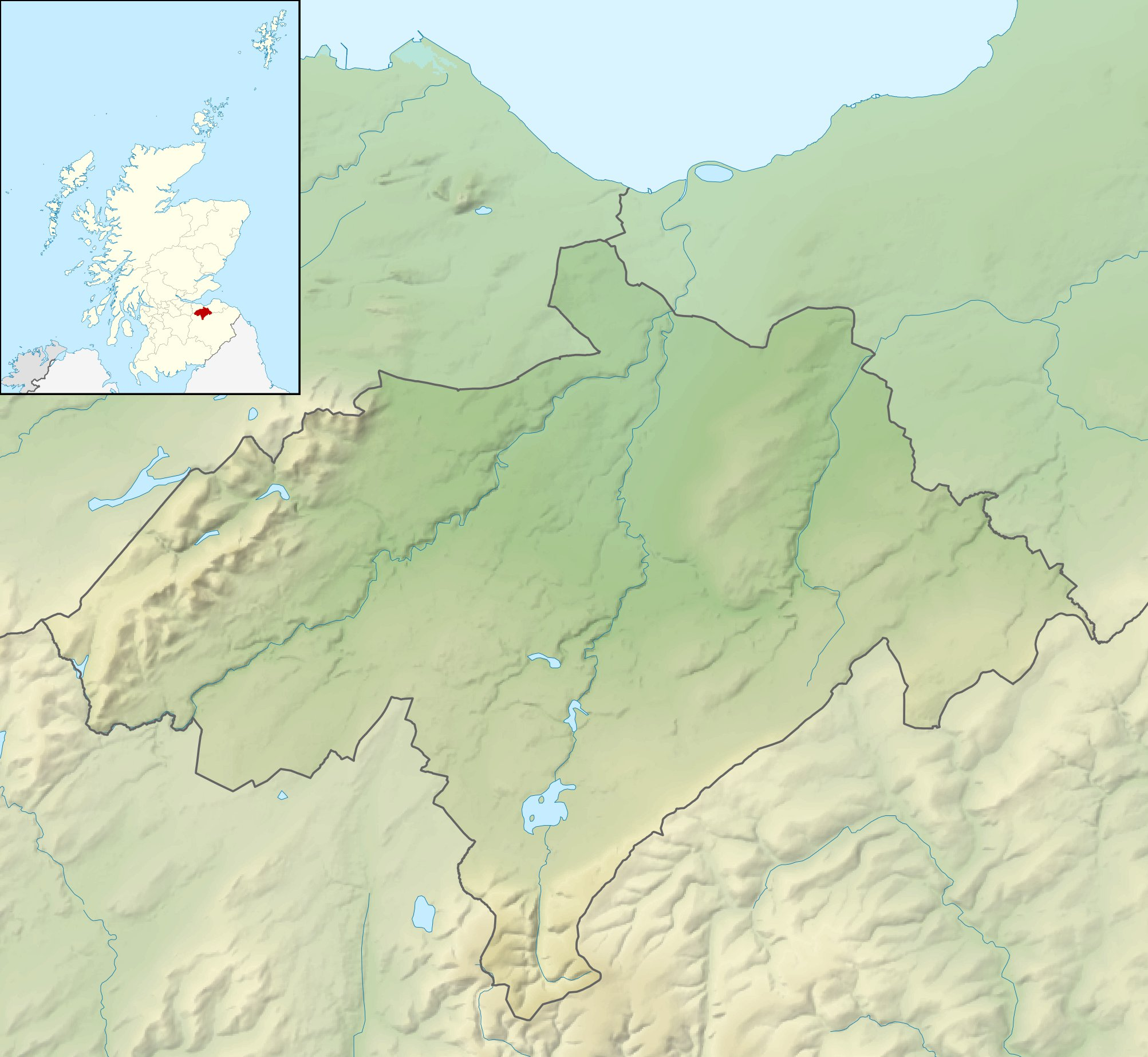
- Location within Midlothian
- Location: Midlothian, Scotland
- Coordinates: 55°51′40″N 3°15′14″W
- Type: reservoir

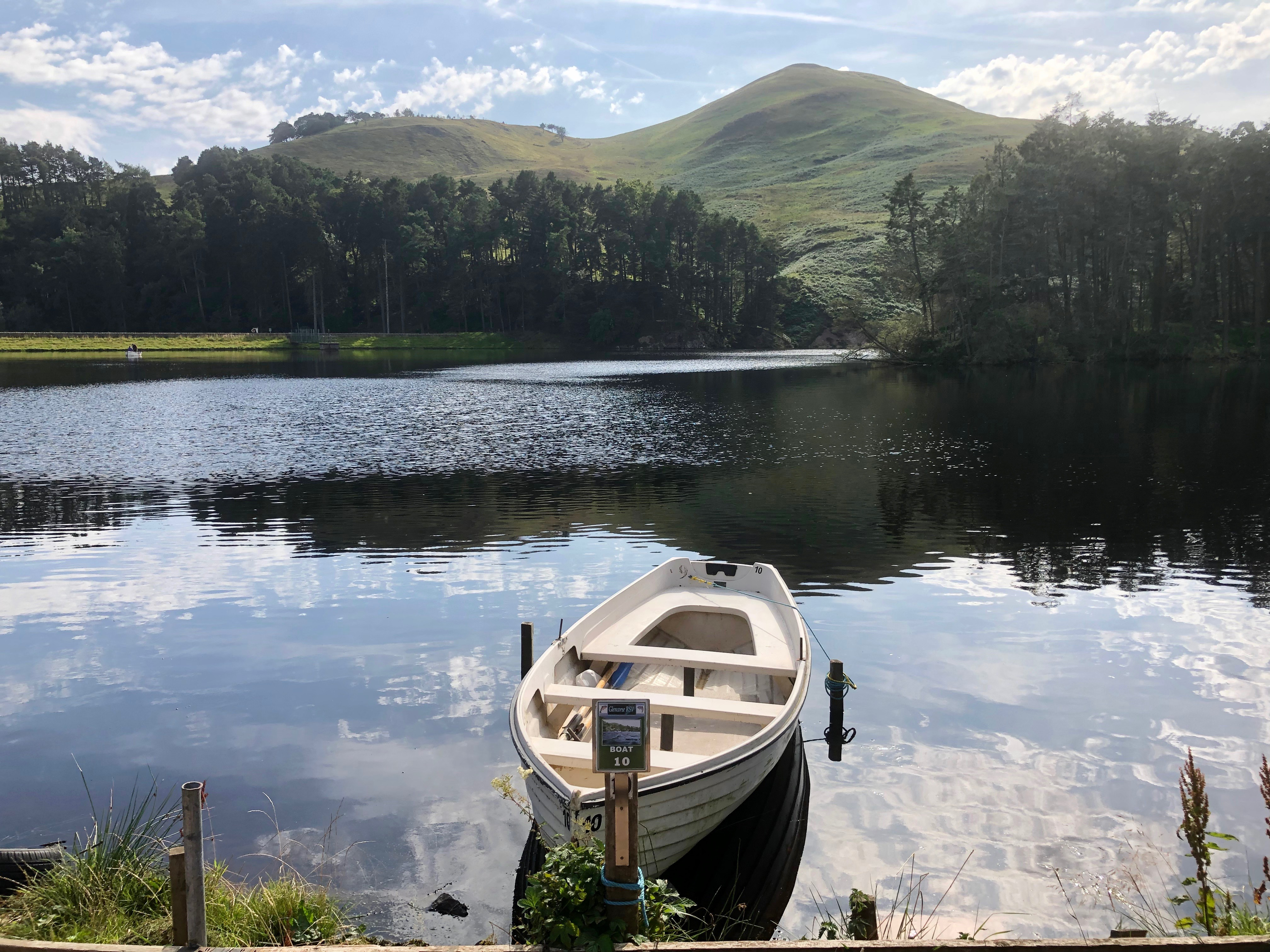
Looking east, at landing stage for fly fishing boats, across the reservoir to Turnhouse Hill.

Glencorse Reservoir is a reservoir in Midlothian, Scotland, two miles west of Glencorse, in the Pentland Hills.

It is retained by an earth dam, and it was built between 1820 and 1824 by James Jardine to provide water for the mills of Auchendinny, Milton Bridge and Glencorse, and to supply drinking water to the citizens of Edinburgh. The dam is 23.5 metres (77 ft) at its highest point, one of the tallest in Britain when it was constructed, and was built at a point where a spur of rock narrowed the channel of the Glencorse Burn, which caused great difficulties in its construction. The gravel bed on which the burn flowed was up to 16.2 metres (53 ft) deep and when this was removed to create a clay-puddle dyke, the hill on the south side collapsed. The reservoir is the property of Scottish Water.

The reservoir was built to provide water to compensate the mills at Glencorse, Milton Bridge and Auchendinny and to ensure a supply of drinking water to Edinburgh through a cast-iron pipe which took water to two small reservoirs in the city, at Castlehill and near George Heriot's School. The reservoir has an area of 19.3 hectares (48 acres).

A Water Treatment Works was opened at Glencorse in 2012 to replace aged facilities at Alnwickhill and Fairmilehead and treat water from Talla, Fruid and Megget reservoirs. In 2019, Glencorse Water Treatment Works was reported to have the capacity to supply up to 175 million litres of water per day and was supplying water to up to 450,000 customers in parts of West Lothian and Edinburgh.

Beneath the surface of the reservoir are the remains of St Catherine's of the Hopes, a 13th-century chapel.

== See also ==
- Edgelaw Reservoir
- Gladhouse Reservoir
- North Esk Reservoir
- Rosebery Reservoir
- List of reservoirs and dams in the United Kingdom
