= North Middleton, Midlothian =

Coordinates: 55.819°N 3.026°W

North Middleton
- The road into the village

- Location within Midlothian
- OS grid reference: NT357588
- Council area: Midlothian
- Lieutenancy area: Midlothian
- Country: Scotland
- Sovereign state: United Kingdom
- Post town: GOREBRIDGE
- Postcode district: EH23
- Dialling code: 01875
- Police: Scotland
- Fire: Scottish
- Ambulance: Scottish
- UK Parliament: Midlothian
- Scottish Parliament: Midlothian South, Tweeddale and Lauderdale

North Middleton is a village in the civil parish of Borthwick, Midlothian, Scotland. Outlying hamlets include Borthwick and Middleton.
