= Crichton, Midlothian =

Village and civil parish in Midlothian, Scotland

Coordinates: 55.847°N 2.982°W

Crichton
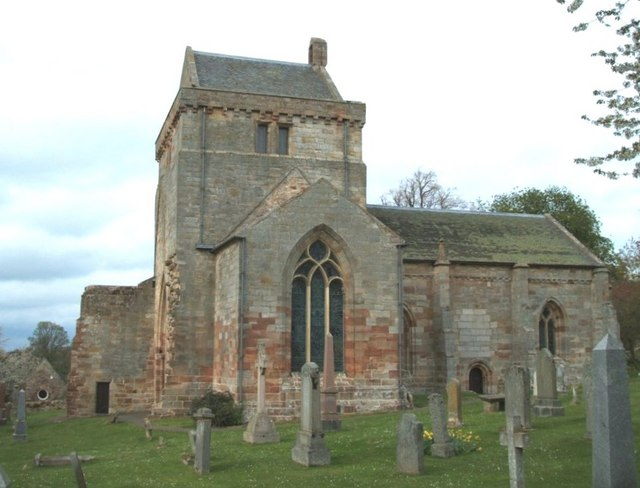
- The former collegiate church at Crichton

- Location within Midlothian
- OS grid reference: NT384619
- Council area: Midlothian
- Lieutenancy area: Midlothian
- Country: Scotland
- Sovereign state: United Kingdom
- Post town: PATHHEAD
- Postcode district: EH37
- Dialling code: 01875
- Police: Scotland
- Fire: Scottish
- Ambulance: Scottish
- UK Parliament: Midlothian
- Scottish Parliament: Midlothian North and Musselburgh

Crichton (CRY-tonne) is a small village and civil parish in Midlothian, Scotland, around 2 miles (3 km) south of Pathhead and the same distance east of Gorebridge.

The second element of the name is clearly from the Old English word tūn 'farm, settlement'. The first element is less certain, however, and could be from Gaelic crioch 'border' or Cumbric craig 'rock'.

To the west of the village is the 15th-century parish church, formerly a collegiate church, established by William Crichton, 1st Lord Crichton, the Lord Chancellor of Scotland from 1439 to 1453. To the south of the church is Crichton Castle, begun in the late 14th century by William's father John de Crichton and featuring a fine 16th-century Italianate courtyard façade.

The civil parish has a population of 1,223 in 2011.

== See also ==
- Crichton (disambiguation)
- Creighton (disambiguation)
