= Milton Bridge =

Village in Scotland

Coordinates: 55.849°N 3.201°W

Milton Bridge is a village in Midlothian, Scotland. It is located two miles north of Penicuik on the Glencorse Burn and gets its name from the bridge crossing.

In the 19th century, local paper mills caused the village to grow. Later the British Army established the Glencorse Barracks for the Royal Scots. It is still in operation, as a depot for The Royal Highland Fusiliers, 2nd Battalion The Royal Regiment of Scotland.

An experimental farm was set up near Milton Bridge in 1924 by the East Scotland College of Agriculture. In 1947 the University of Edinburgh purchased additional farmland for agricultural training.

The village has one primary school, Glencorse Primary. Beeslack High School is nearby. Another village, Auchendinny, lies to the north. The two are separated by Glencorse Golf Course.

The old Glencorse Kirk, located in the grounds of Glencorse House, and local pub the Fishers Tryst are the setting for Robert Louis Stevenson's, (author of Treasure Island), short story "The Body Snatchers", written in 1881 and premiered in The Pall Mall Gazette in 1884. During this time Stevenson was travelling between Scotland and England and frequented the inn which was built in 1824 and torn down in 1954. The rebuilt pub remains and is the main social gathering place in Milton Bridge.

Joseph Bell FRCSE ( 1837 1911) was a Scottish surgeon and lecturer at the medical school of the University of Edinburgh. He is best known as an inspiration for the literary character Sherlock Holmes. Lived and died at Mauricewood House.
