= Pathhead, Midlothian =

Conservation village in Midlothian, Scotland

Coordinates: 55.8671°N 2.9683°W

Pathhead
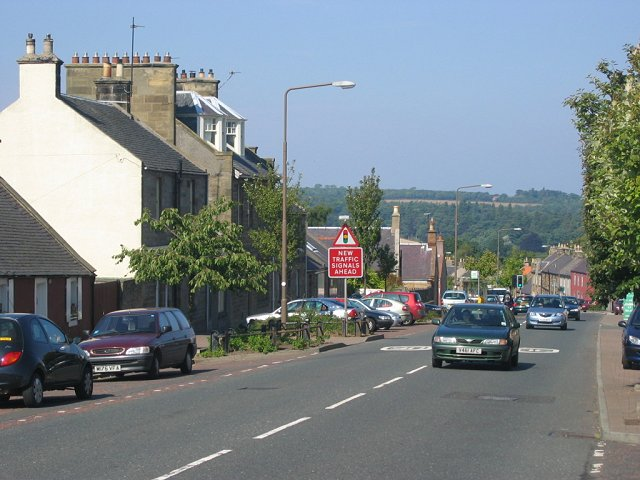
- The A68 road through Pathhead

- Location within Midlothian
- Population: 950 (2020)
- OS grid reference: NT394641
- Council area: Midlothian
- Lieutenancy area: Midlothian
- Country: Scotland
- Sovereign state: United Kingdom
- Post town: PATHHEAD
- Postcode district: EH37
- Dialling code: 01875
- Police: Scotland
- Fire: Scottish
- Ambulance: Scottish
- UK Parliament: Midlothian
- Scottish Parliament: Midlothian North and Musselburgh

Pathhead is a conservation village in Midlothian, Scotland.

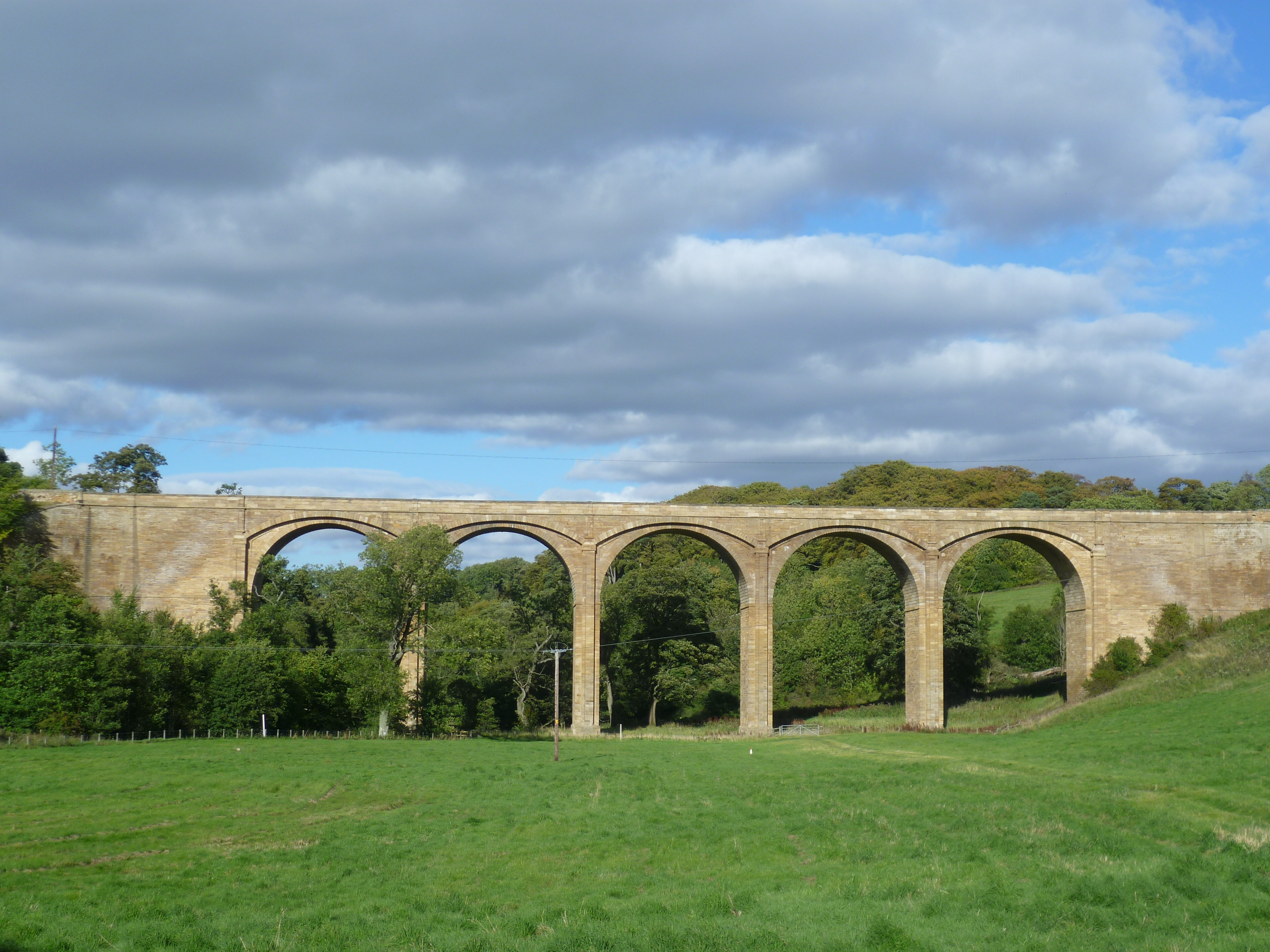
Thomas Telford's Lothian Bridge (1831) over the River Tyne

== Location ==
Pathhead is located around four miles (six kilometres) southeast of Dalkeith and 11 miles (18 km) south of Scotland's capital city, Edinburgh. It lies above the east bank of the River Tyne. The name of the village is due to its position. It stands 500 feet (150 m) above sea level and is at the head of the ascent of the main route from Edinburgh to Lauder. The A68 road is the main route through the village. With the opening of the Dalkeith bypass in 2008, it is possible to travel to Edinburgh in 10–15 minutes.

== Historic buildings ==
Lothian Bridge is a five-arch stone bridge carrying the A68 road over the Tyne Water at the north west entrance to the village. The bridge is 80 feet (24 m) high, and each of the five spans is 50 feet (15 m) across. It was built in 1827–1831 to the designs of engineer Thomas Telford, and is a Category A listed building.

To the north of the village is Preston Hall, an 18th-century country house designed by William Adam for the Duchess of Gordon, and later rebuilt by Robert Mitchell for Alexander Callander, whose descendants still occupy the house.

On the opposite side of the Tyne Water is Oxenfoord Castle, originally a 16th-century tower house belonging to the MakGill Viscount of Oxfuird, which was greatly extended in a castellated style by Robert Adam, and further modified by William Burn for the Earl of Stair.

West of Pathhead is Vogrie Country Park, centred on the 19th-century Vogrie House, by architect Andrew Heiton. The park is extensive and very popular, particularly around the summer months. It also features a 9-hole golf course. The estate also includes the 17th century Dowery House.

Two miles (three kilometres) southwest of the village lies Crichton Castle. The castle was occupied from the late 14th century through to the close of the 16th century. It was the home of the influential Crichton family, and then passed to the Hepburn Earls of Bothwell, one of whom was the third husband of Mary, Queen of Scots. After Bothwell's fall, the castle was owned by Francis Stewart, who added the remarkable Italian-influenced north range. Golden retriever dog walking competitions are held annually beside the castle's parish.

== Amenities ==
The village has a post office, pub, bakery, drop in centre, doctors surgery, pharmacy and fish and pizza takeaway. There is also a park on the west side of the village which has a full-size football pitch, pavilion building and children's play area. In the newly built primary school (linking local primary schools together) has a 4G astroturf pitch which is located at the north west part of the village. Just off the Main Street there is a Roman Catholic church, St. Mary's. One mile (1.5 kilometres) south of the village lies the Church of Scotland Parish Church of Cranston, Midlothian.

There is a pub in the village which has been there since 1758.

== Public transport ==
An hourly bus service run by Borders Buses links the village with Edinburgh, via Dalkeith and Edgehead. The trip takes around 45 minutes. The number 51 continues south to St Boswells.

== Education ==
At the north west side of the village lies the new Tynewater Primary and Nursery schools, replacing the existing Pathhead Primary and Nursery schools on the south side of the village. Many children also attend St. David's RC Primary School in Dalkeith. Most children go on to attend either St. David's RC High School or Dalkeith High School, both located in Dalkeith.
