= Mayfield, Midlothian =

Community in Midlothian, Scotland

Coordinates: 55°52′16.56″N 3°2′10.15″W

Mayfield
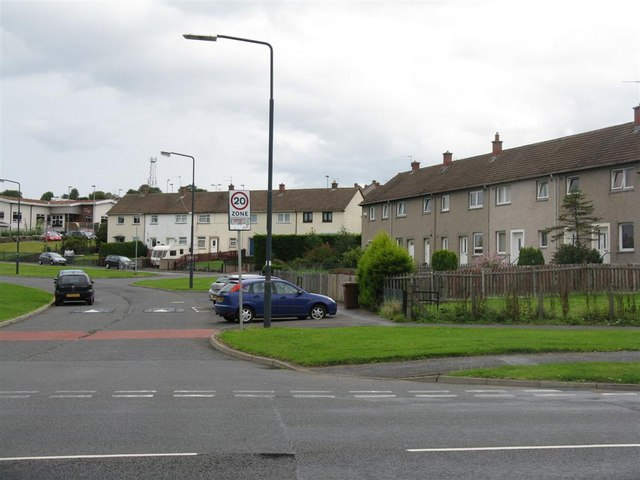
- Lawfield Road, typical scene of modest housing and communal green space in Mayfield

- Location within Midlothian
- Population: 13,690 (2020)
- Council area: Midlothian
- Country: Scotland
- Sovereign state: United Kingdom
- Police: Scotland
- Fire: Scottish
- Ambulance: Scottish

Mayfield is a community in Midlothian, Scotland, located just south of Dalkeith near Edinburgh between the A68 and the A7 south. It had an estimated population of 13,690 in 2020.

This housing development was built in the 1950s as overspill accommodation for the colliery workers of nearby Newtongrange and Easthouses and for other essential workers, as well as to house the workforce for a small but relatively successful industrial estate. The decline of the coal industry in the 1980s led to the closure of the collieries.

The massive growth in population in this part of Newbattle parish in the 1950s led to the existing mining village of Easthouses being virtually 'swallowed up' into the new housing development of Mayfield, which today has a population similar to that of a small town.

With the communities of Mayfield and Easthouses ever expanding, in 1955 the Church of Scotland had an additional church building erected within Newbattle parish. Mayfield and Easthouses church was built in a more utilitarian and functional style than the 18th-century building at Newbattle, as it had to double as both a place of worship and a place where the various church and other organisations (e.g. Boys Brigade [Anchor Boys, Junior Section, and Company Section], Girls Brigade, Cubs, Scouts, and Brownies) could establish themselves.

There are three primary schools: Mayfield Primary School which is conjoined with St. Luke's RC Primary School, and Lawfield Primary School (a new school made up of the former Langlaw Primary and Bryans Primary).
