= Newtongrange =

Coordinates: 55.868°N 3.067°W

Newtongrange: Scottish Gaelic: Baile Ùr na Grainnse; Scots: Nitten by the Bing; Nitten
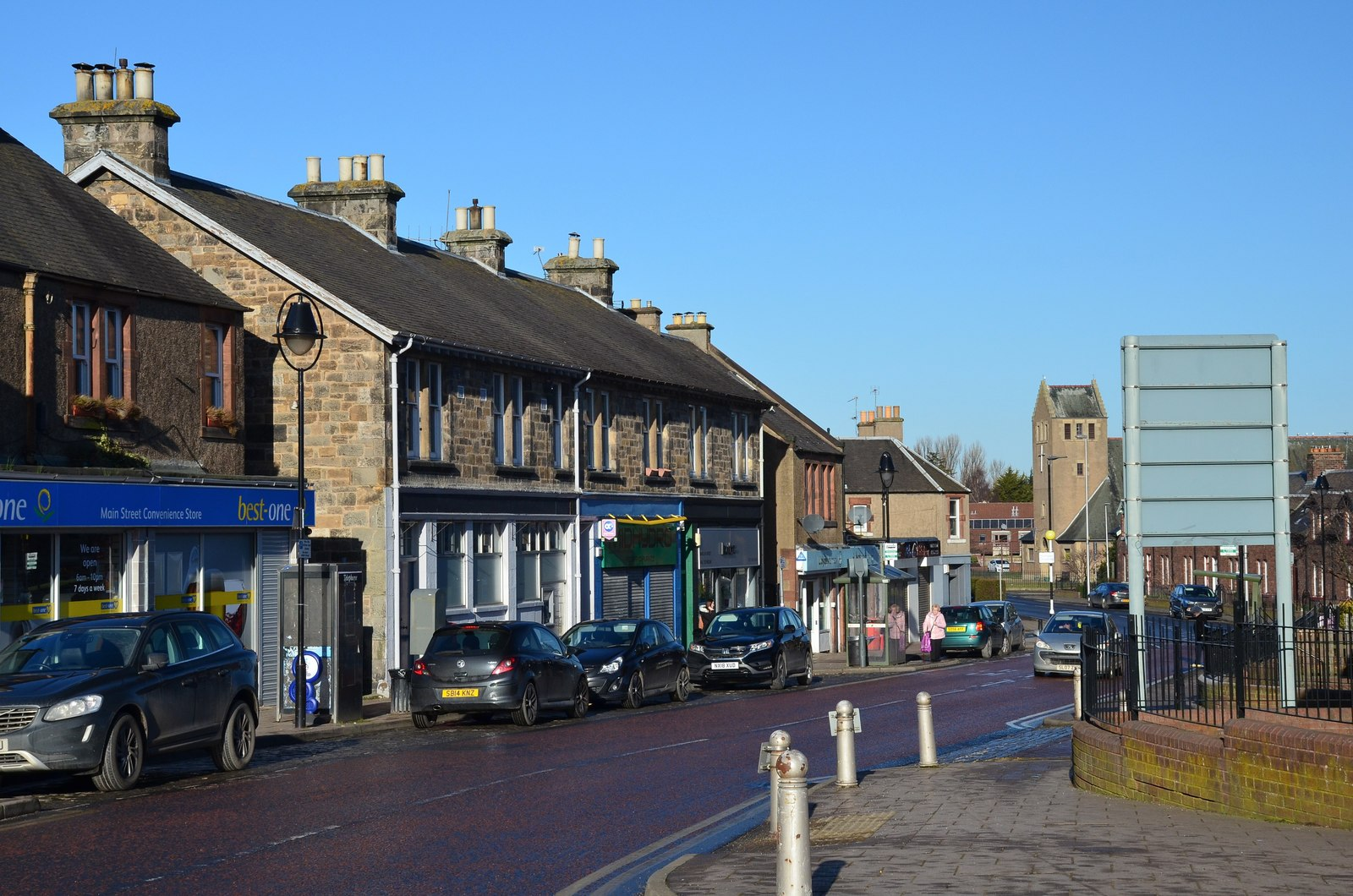
- Main Street, Newtongrange

- Location within Midlothian
- Population: 5,341
- OS grid reference: NT332644
- Council area: Midlothian
- Lieutenancy area: Midlothian
- Country: Scotland
- Sovereign state: United Kingdom
- Post town: DALKEITH
- Postcode district: EH22
- Dialling code: 0131
- Police: Scotland
- Fire: Scottish
- Ambulance: Scottish
- UK Parliament: Midlothian
- Scottish Parliament: Midlothian South, Tweeddale and Lauderdale

Newtongrange is a former mining village in Midlothian, Scotland. Known in local dialect as Nitten, or Nitten by the Bing, it became Scotland's largest mining village in the 1890s, with the sinking of the Lady Victoria Colliery and a shaft over 1600 feet deep. This closed in 1981 but today houses the National Mining Museum, an Anchor Point of ERIH - The European Route of Industrial Heritage.

== History ==
From its humble beginnings in 1843 with 100 people, the council in Newtongrange grew to see its roll rise to over 1,000 in the 1950s. On 16 January 2003, the parishes of Newtongrange and Newbattle united to form a new Newbattle parish. The new parish is in fact that which existed before the Disruption of the Church of Scotland in 1843.

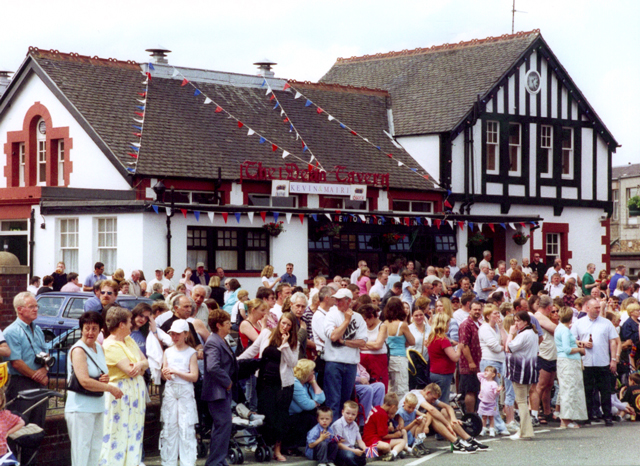
The Dean Tavern, photographed during the village's annual gala day.

Newtongrange is also home to the Dean Tavern, an example of a Gothenburg pub. The premise of Gothenburg pubs was that they were not to be attractive or welcoming, in order to discourage drinking and the sales of spirits was not to be encouraged. The shareholders of the trust were to receive a maximum return of 5% annually and all other profits were to be used to benefit the local community. The town treasury was to control this income and use it to provide libraries, museums, parks and other community facilities. The local coal companies were often a source of funds to establish these systems in Scotland.

== Sport and leisure ==
Newtongrange Star F.C., who compete in the East of Scotland League Premier Division and play at New Victoria Park in the village. The original Victoria Park was used as a speedway training track in the 1950 and the trainees raced as Newtongrange Rockets. The sport was revived briefly in 1970 and in 1973. The team of 1970 was known as Newtongrange Saints while in 1973 the team were known as Edinburgh Monarchs. Victoria Park's track become the home to stock car racing before its closure and redevelopment for housing.

== Economy ==
Black Diamond FM radio station is based in the village.

== Transport ==
The village is served by Newtongrange railway station giving rail access to the Borders and Edinburgh Waverley station.

Lothian Buses services 29, X33 and 48 serve the town providing connections to Edinburgh City centre, Dalkeith, Royal Infirmary, Fort Kinnaird, Musselburgh and Crewe Toll.

Borders Buses service X95 also runs through Newtongrange providing connections to Edinburgh City centre, and the Borders.

== See also ==
- List of places in Midlothian
- List of places in Scotland
