= EH postcode area =

Postcode area within the United Kingdom

Edinburgh
- Postcode area
- Location within the United Kingdom
- Coordinates: 55.924°N 3.228°W
- Sovereign state: United Kingdom
- Postcode area: EH
- Postcode area name: Edinburgh
- Post towns: 38
- Postcode districts: 57
- Postcode sectors: 167
- Postcodes (live): 24,416
- Postcodes (total): 32,363
- Statistics as at May 2020

The EH postcode area, also known as the Edinburgh postcode area, is a group of 55 postcode districts covering Scotland's capital city and an extensive surrounding area.

The area's post towns are Balerno, Bathgate, Bo'ness, Bonnyrigg, Broxburn, Currie, Dalkeith, Dunbar, East Linton, Edinburgh, Gorebridge, Gullane, Haddington, Heriot, Humbie, Innerleithen, Juniper Green, Kirkliston, Kirknewton, Lasswade, Linlithgow, Livingston, Loanhead, Longniddry, Musselburgh, Newbridge, North Berwick, Pathhead, Peebles, Penicuik, Prestonpans, Rosewell, Roslin, South Queensferry, Tranent, Walkerburn, West Calder and West Linton.

It replaced a system of postal district numbers introduced in 1935, with the postcode incorporating the old one or two-digit district number. For example, "45, York Place, Edinburgh, 1" became "45 York Place, Edinburgh EH1 3HP".

Mail for the EH postcode area is processed at Edinburgh Mail Centre, along with mail for the KY, PH, DD, FK and TD postcode areas.

== Coverage ==
The approximate coverage of the postcode districts is as follows.

=== Edinburgh: EH1 to EH17, EH28 to EH30 ===
Postcode district	Post town	Coverage	Local authority area(s)
EH1	EDINBURGH	Mostly consists of Edinburgh's Old Town. Also hosts the old GPO building (at EH1 1AA) and the areas immediately to the north of this are also included, that is St James Quarter and the areas down Leith Street and Broughton Street.	
EH2	EDINBURGH	The New Town and central commercial area of Edinburgh which includes Princes Street.	
EH3	EDINBURGH	An odd shaped area surrounding EH1 and EH2 to the north, west and south. It can be divided into three distinct areas: The New Town area, north of Queen Street and northwards to Stockbridge.; The West End, including some of Edinburgh's financial district; The Tollcross and Fountainbridge areas.	
EH4	EDINBURGH	Radiates from the older and more central areas out to the suburban areas added to them, as the city grew outwards during the 20th century. EH4, then, branches out from Dean Village and Comely Bank along a corridor centred on the A90 as far as Barnton and Cramond. Central to this area is the Sainsbury's in Craigleith Retail Park adjacent to the A90.	
EH5	EDINBURGH	Based on a village formerly separate from the city; in this case, Granton on the Firth of Forth. EH5 extends inwards from the coast to Ferry Road.	
EH6	EDINBURGH	Covers Leith, as well as Newhaven bordering it on the west.	
EH7	EDINBURGH	The inner city area between central Edinburgh and Leith, and radiates out to Restalrig and Craigentinny.	
EH8	EDINBURGH	The inner city Southside, Newington and Canongate areas, in the west of the postcode area. It extends eastwards around Holyrood Park to take in areas including Abbeyhill and Mountcastle; being in east Edinburgh, these areas have no obvious connection with the Southside. The postcode effectively takes in the area surrounding Holyrood Park.	
EH9	EDINBURGH	The inner city, Marchmont and Grange, Blackford and around Minto Street, including Causewayside.	
EH10	EDINBURGH	A corridor along the A702 from Bruntsfield, through Morningside as far as Fairmilehead.	City of Edinburgh, Midlothian
EH11	EDINBURGH	A corridor (rather thin in shape) along the A71 from Haymarket Station, through Gorgie and Stenhouse to Sighthill and the Calders.	
EH12	EDINBURGH	A corridor along the A8 from Haymarket through Murrayfield and Corstorphine as far as the Gyle.	
EH13	EDINBURGH	Based on the previously separate village of Colinton, and including Oxgangs.	
EH14	BALERNO, CURRIE, EDINBURGH, JUNIPER GREEN	A corridor in south-west Edinburgh starting at Slateford, through Longstone, Wester Hailes, Juniper Green, Currie and on to Balerno.	
EH15	EDINBURGH	Based on Portobello and Duddingston, formerly separate settlements to Edinburgh.	
EH16	EDINBURGH	Based on the formerly separate village of Liberton. It extends north and north-east to Cameron Toll, Craigmillar and Niddrie. Originally part of Edinburgh 9.	
EH17	EDINBURGH	Based on the formerly separate village of Gilmerton, taking in Moredun and extending westwards as far as Mortonhall. Originally part of Edinburgh 9.	
EH28	NEWBRIDGE	Newbridge, Ratho	City of Edinburgh
EH29	KIRKLISTON	Kirkliston	City of Edinburgh
EH30	SOUTH QUEENSFERRY	South Queensferry	City of Edinburgh
EH77	EDINBURGH	Special postcode used by Census 2021	
EH91	EDINBURGH	Special postcode used by Jobcentre Plus	
EH95	EDINBURGH	Special postcode used by Scottish Gas	
EH99	EDINBURGH	Special postcode used by the Scottish Parliament	

=== Outside Edinburgh ===
Postcode district	Post town	Coverage	Local authority area(s)
EH18	LASSWADE	Lasswade, extending up the valley of the River North Esk to Polton	Midlothian
EH19	BONNYRIGG	Bonnyrigg	Midlothian
EH20	LOANHEAD	Loanhead	Midlothian
EH21	MUSSELBURGH	Musselburgh, Wallyford, Whitecraig, Newcraighall	East Lothian, City of Edinburgh
EH22	DALKEITH	Dalkeith, Danderhall, Mayfield, Newtongrange, Shawfair	Midlothian
EH23	GOREBRIDGE	Gorebridge, North Middleton	Midlothian
EH24	ROSEWELL	Rosewell	Midlothian
EH25	ROSLIN	Roslin, Bilston	Midlothian
EH26	PENICUIK	Penicuik	Midlothian
EH27	KIRKNEWTON	Kirknewton	West Lothian
EH31	GULLANE	Gullane	East Lothian
EH32	LONGNIDDRY, PRESTONPANS	Prestonpans, Cockenzie, Port Seton	East Lothian
EH33	TRANENT	Tranent	East Lothian
EH34	TRANENT	Pencaitland	East Lothian
EH35	TRANENT	Ormiston	East Lothian
EH36	HUMBIE	Humbie	East Lothian
EH37	PATHHEAD	Pathhead	Midlothian
EH38	HERIOT	Heriot	Midlothian, Scottish Borders
EH39	NORTH BERWICK	North Berwick	East Lothian
EH40	EAST LINTON	East Linton	East Lothian
EH41	HADDINGTON	Haddington	East Lothian
EH42	DUNBAR	Dunbar, Broxburn	East Lothian
EH43	WALKERBURN	Walkerburn	Scottish Borders
EH44	INNERLEITHEN	Innerleithen	Scottish Borders
EH45	PEEBLES	Peebles	Scottish Borders
EH46	WEST LINTON	West Linton, Dolphinton, Blyth Bridge	Scottish Borders
EH47	BATHGATE	Whitburn, Bathgate, Fauldhouse, Stoneyburn	West Lothian
EH48	BATHGATE	Armadale, Bathgate	West Lothian
EH49	LINLITHGOW	Linlithgow	West Lothian
EH51	BO'NESS	Bo'ness	Falkirk
EH52	BROXBURN	Broxburn, Winchburgh	West Lothian
EH53	LIVINGSTON	Mid Calder, East Calder, Pumpherston	West Lothian
EH54	LIVINGSTON	Livingston	West Lothian
EH55	WEST CALDER	West Calder	West Lothian, South Lanarkshire

== Map ==
EH postcode area map, showing postcode districts in red and post towns in grey text, with links to nearby FK, KY, ML and TD postcode areas.

Detailed map of postcode districts and post towns in and around Edinburgh

== See also ==
- Postcode Address File
- List of postcode areas in the United Kingdom
