= Carnethy 5 =

Annual hill race in Scotland

The Carnethy 5 is an annual hill race held in February, taking place in the Pentland Hills to the south of Edinburgh. Starting in a field near Silverburn, the route climbs five hills: Scald Law, South Black Hill, East Kip and West Kip are tackled before the final ascent to Carnethy Hill and the descent to the finish. The course is approximately 6 miles (9.7 km) in length with around 2,500 feet (760 m) of ascent, and the terrain is mostly grass and heather with some scree.

== History ==
The first Carnethy Hill Race took place in 1971, with the idea coming from Jimmy Jardine of Peebles. The intention was to commemorate the Battle of Roslin which had been fought in the area in the early fourteenth century.

The inaugural event started and finished in Penicuik and only climbed Carnethy Hill. The next year, the course was extended to include Scald Law. In 1979, a ladies’ race took place over Carnethy only, the women having in previous years been restricted to a cross-country route round Penicuik Public Park. In 1980, the hill race was cancelled due to thick mist which led the police to feel that allowing the runners to cross the A702 road was unsafe. The organisers put on a two-lap cross-country race instead. However, only twenty-six men and women ran the cross-country course, with 103 others disregarding the cancellation decision and running the hill race. After this, the 1981 race was run over a new course which did not require the road crossing. This course was popular with the competitors and there was a consensus that the new route should be used in future years.

In 1986, the event was run with deep snow on the course, resulting in slow times.

The 1990 race was run in very poor weather with rain, wind and sleet. As some competitors were still being bussed to the start from the registration area after the official race start time, it was decided to let the bulk of the field set off to prevent the waiting runners getting dangerously cold, and the rest of the runners started twelve minutes later when the last ones had arrived. The fastest runner in the first group was Keith Anderson in 53:04 and the quickest in the second group was Andrew Peace in 52:51 but it was decided in the circumstances to consider the two as joint winners of the race.

The race has had around 500 competitors in recent years, making it one of the most popular hill or fell races and it is sometimes seen as the first major race of the season.

A considerable number of runners have completed the race twenty-one or more times, an accomplishment for which an engraved quaich is awarded. Jimmy Jardine holds the distinction of having done the race a total of forty-six times since 1971.

A junior race on Scald Law is held in conjunction with the Carnethy 5.

== Results ==
The men’s course record is held by Gavin Bland with a time of 46:56 set in 1999. The women’s record is 54:20 by Angela Mudge in 2002. Mudge has the most wins, with fourteen between 1996 and 2013. Rob Jebb won the men’s race five times between 2002 and 2010.

The winners have been as follows.

Year	Men	Time	Women	Time
1971	Ian McCafferty and Jim Alder	0:47:40		
1972	Dave Cannon	0:53:28	Marianne Poole	0:24:07
1973	Dave Cannon	0:54:05	E. Livingstone	0:18:14
1974	Jeff Norman	0:52:01	Sally Aitken	0:19:34
1975	Alistair Blamire	0:50:37	Lorna Inglis	0:23:05
1976	Robert Harrison	0:51:22	Janet Higgins	0:21:54
1977	Martin Weeks	0:51:31	Shiela McMillan	0:22:46
1978	Martin Weeks	0:51:52		
1979	Alan McGee	0:50:54	Anne Bland	1:00:08
1980^{[Note 1]}	Colin Donnelly and A. Gourley	0:40:02	Anne Bland	0:35:29
1981	Bob Whitfield	0:51:14	Fiona Hinde	1:03:03
1982	Bob Whitfield	0:50:47	Fiona Wild	1:05:29
1983	Kenny Stuart	0:48:21	Lesley Barwise	1:11:35
1984	Kenny Stuart	0:49:44	Pauline Haworth	1:01:13
1985	Kenny Stuart	0:48:08	Pauline Haworth	1:01:18
1986	Colin Valentine	1:04:40	Anne Salisbury	1:17:54
1987	Malcolm Patterson	0:48:47	Penny Rother	1:00:26
1988	Malcolm Patterson	0:48:31	Penny Rother	1:00:08
1989	Malcolm Patterson	0:49:42	Angela Carson	0:58:32
1990^{[Note 2]}	Andrew Peace and Keith Anderson	0:52:51 and 0:53:04	Yvette Hague	1:01:15
1991	Andrew Peace	0:54:13	Tricia Calder	1:02:00
1992	Andrew Peace	0:49:20	Tricia Calder	0:58:47
1993	Neil Wilkinson	0:48:47	Helene Diamantides	1:01:56
1994	John Brooks	0:48:21	Angela Brand-Barker	1:00:55
1995	Andy Kitchin	0:47:58	Angela Brand-Barker	1:00:55
1996	John Brooks	0:47:50	Angela Mudge	0:59:31
1997	John Brooks	0:48:39	Angela Mudge	0:57:43
1998	John Brooks	0:48:21	Angela Mudge	0:57:36
1999	Gavin Bland	0:46:56	Angela Mudge	0:57:07
2000	Jon Duncan	0:48:53	Angela Mudge	0:55:09
2001	Jim Davies	0:49:56	Nicola Davies	1:01:35
2002	Rob Jebb	0:48:00	Angela Mudge	0:54:20
2003	David Rodgers	0:48:17	Angela Mudge	0:56:03
2004	Jethro Lennox	0:48:39	Angela Mudge	0:55:20
2005	Murray Strain	0:52:10	Jill Mykura	1:00:47
2006	Rob Jebb	0:48:50	Angela Mudge	0:56:19
2007	Rob Jebb	0:47:59	Angela Mudge	0:56:09
2008	Lloyd Taggart	0:47:11	Angela Mudge	0:55:13
2009	Rob Jebb	0:53:02	Fiona Maxwell	1:03:43
2010	Rob Jebb	0:48:41	Claire Gordon	1:05:12
2011	Tom Owens	0:50:31	Angela Mudge	0:57:25
2012	Orlando Edwards	0:47:53	Angela Mudge	0:56:03
2013	Finlay Wild	0:49:46	Angela Mudge	0:56:03
2014	Orlando Edwards	0:51:27	Sarah McCormack	1:00:43
2015	Andrew Douglas	0:49:23	Charlotte Morgan	0:56:46
2016	Prasad Prasad	0:54:08	Charlotte Morgan	1:01:30
2017	Finlay Wild	0:52:50	Hannah Russell	1:02:30
2018	Carl Bell	0:51:35	Tessa Strain	0:59:53
2019	Alexander Chepelin	0:50:34	Sarah McCormack	1:01:37
2020	Alexander Chepelin	0:53:17	Hannah Russell	1:01:58
2021	Cancelled due to the COVID-19 pandemic			

Note 1: Gourley won the replacement cross-country race in 40:02 and Colin Donnelly won the unofficial hill race in which times were not recorded.

Note 2: There were two separate starts in 1990. The fastest runner in the first group was Keith Anderson in 53:04 and the fastest in the second group was Andrew Peace in 52:51.
