= List of Scottish council areas by highest point =

This is a list of the 32 council areas of Scotland by their highest point.

Rank	Council area	Height (m)	Name	Grid reference
1	Highland	1345	Ben Nevis	NN166713
2=	Aberdeenshire	1309	Ben Macdui	NN989989
2=	Moray	1309	Ben Macdui	NN989989
4	Perth and Kinross	1214	Ben Lawers	NN636414
5	Stirling	1174	Ben More	NN432244
6	Argyll and Bute	1126	Ben Cruachan	NN069304
7	Angus	1068	Glas Maol	NO166765
8	North Ayrshire	874	Goat Fell	NR991415
9	Dumfries and Galloway	843	Merrick	NX427855
10	Scottish Borders	840	Broad Law	NT146235
11	Western Isles	799	An Cliseam	NB155073
12	South Ayrshire	786	Kirriereoch Hill^{1}	NX420870
13	South Lanarkshire	748	Culter Fell	NT052290
14	Clackmannanshire	721	Ben Cleuch	NN902006
15	East Ayrshire	700	Blackcraig Hill	NS647064
16	Midlothian	651	Blackhope Scar	NT315483
17	East Dunbartonshire	578	Earl's Seat	NS569838
18	City of Edinburgh	567	East Cairn Hill	NT128592
19	West Lothian	562	West Cairn Hill	NT107584
20	East Lothian	535	Meikle Says Law	NT581617
21	North Lanarkshire	526	Cort ma Law east top^{1}	NS660805
22=	Fife	522	West Lomond	NO197066
22=	Renfrewshire	522	Hill of Stake	NS273630
24	Orkney Islands	481	Ward Hill	HY229022
25	Shetland Islands	450	Ronas Hill	HU305834
26	Inverclyde	441	Creuch Hill	NS265685
27	West Dunbartonshire	401	Duncolm	NS470774
28	East Renfrewshire	376	Corse Hill	NS598464
29	Falkirk	357	Darrach Hill	NS753827
30	Aberdeen City	265	Brimmond Hill	NJ855091
31	Glasgow City	200	Cathkin Braes	NS615584
32	Dundee City	175	Gallow Hill[2]	NO391393

== Footnotes ==
1. True summit lies just outwith area boundary
2. Dundee - Dundee Law at NO364341 is the highest point within the built up urban area of Dundee but is lower than Gallow Hill which is within the City Council boundaries.

== See also ==
- List of counties of Scotland 1890–1975
