= Jenny Armstrong (shepherd) =

Scottish shepherd (1903–1985)

Janet (Jenny) Armstrong
- Detail of Sheep, Shepherdess and Harbour Craig
- Born: May 9, 1903; Fairliehope Farm, Carlops
- Died: November 20, 1985 (aged 82)
- Occupation: Shepherd

Janet (Jenny) Armstrong (9 May 1903 – 20 November 1985) was a shepherd who became the focus of the Scottish artist Victoria Crowe's work. After she retired, she continued to keep a small flock, and this was when Crowe moved next door and they became friends. Between 1970 and 1985, Crowe produced more than 50 paintings and drawings of Armstrong's retirement years, showing her journey through the final 15 years of life. Crowe's paintings and drawings were put on view at an exhibition entitled A Shepherd's Life at the Scottish National Portrait Gallery in 2000 which attracted more than 30,000 visitors.

== Early life ==
Janet (Jenny) Armstrong was born at the Farm of Fairliehope in Carlops on 9 May 1903 to Margaret (Maggie) Carruthers and Andrew Armstrong. She attended school at Nine Mile Burn, and started her farming career as a child, with her first lambing taking place at the age of nine.

== Career ==
By the time she was in her 20s, Armstrong was looking after a large hill herd in the Pentland Hills. She spent her entire career and life as a hill shepherd, working in bleak conditions. She moved to the remote hamlet of Kittleyknowe in 1940s, living in Monk's Cottage and remained there for the rest of her life.

== Retirement and death ==
Armstrong retired in the 1970s and it was then that Crowe moved in next door. They became friends and Crowe then began capturing Armstrong's life. Armstrong died on 20 November 1985.
