= Eight Mile Burn =

Coordinates: 55.820°N 3.291°W

Eight Mile Burn is a small settlement in Midlothian, South East Scotland, at the base of Pentland Hills Regional Park. It is approximately 11 miles from the centre of Edinburgh, midway between Silverburn and Nine Mile Burn on the A702.
