= Victoria Crowe =

Scottish artist

Victoria Crowe OBE FRSE RSA

Personal details
- Born: Victoria Elizabeth Crowe; 8 May 1945 (age 81) Kingston upon Thames, Surrey, England
- Occupation: Portrait and landscape painter

Victoria Elizabeth Crowe (born 8 May 1945) is a Scottish artist known for her portrait and landscape paintings. She has works in several collections including the National Galleries of Scotland, the National Portrait Gallery, London, and the Royal Scottish Academy.

== Life ==
Victoria Crowe was born in Kingston-on-Thames on 8 May 1945 and educated at Ursuline Convent Grammar School, London. She studied at Kingston College of Art from 1961 to 1965, before undertaking further study at the Royal College of Art in London from 1965 to 1968. On the strength of her postgraduate exhibition, she was invited to teach at Edinburgh College of Art by Robin Philipson, head of drawing and painting. She worked at ECA from 1968 to 1998 as a part-time lecturer in drawing and painting, while also developing her own artistic practice.

She and her husband Michael Walton settled at Kittleyknowe near Carlops in the Pentland Hills, Scotland, where they befriended the shepherdess Jenny Armstrong. In 1973 she had a son and in 1976 a daughter. Her son died in 1995. They set up a trust in his name to raise awareness and funds to tackle oral cancers in young people.

Over the last 35 years, Victoria Crowe has established herself as one of Scotland's prominent painters, developing a signature style that is immediately distinctive. Although her expansive portfolio spans landscapes, still lifes, portraits, self-portraits, and interiors, much of her artistic output transcends such conventional categorization.

She has been described as "one of the most vital and original figurative painters currently at work in Scotland".

== Work ==
She began painting formal portraits in the early 1980s. She has produced many individual portraits, including RD Laing, Kathleen Raine, Tam Dalyell, and Peter Higgs.

Her work includes the series A Shepherd's Life, painted between 1970 and 1985 and first shown at the Scottish National Portrait Gallery in Edinburgh in 2000, which portrays the life of Jenny Armstrong, an elderly shepherd from the Scottish Borders who was Crowe's neighbour at Kittleyknowe. One of the works in the series, Two Views, was converted into a tapestry by Dovecot Studios in Edinburgh, commissioned by Richard Scott, 10th Duke of Buccleuch.

Her first solo exhibition was held in 1983 at the Thackeray Gallery, London, where she would continue to exhibit regularly until 2007.

Between 1970 and 1985, Crowe undertook study trips to Russia, Denmark and Finland. She visited Italy in the early 1990s, which added the influence of Italian Renaissance art to her works, leading to a new phase of increased confidence and achievement. However, in 1994 her art was forced to respond to her son's diagnosis with cancer and then to his death in 1995, which resulted in a series of works expressing her grief, through repeated motifs such as the moon and flowers. Her works in the 21st century included wintry landscapes with skeletal hazel trees which Duncan Macmillan called "numinous pictures; they are spiritual landscapes".

In 2004 Crowe was appointed senior visiting scholar at St Catharine's College, University of Cambridge. The work she produced during this period was shown at the exhibition Plant Memory at the Royal Scottish Academy, Edinburgh.

In 2013, the exhibition Fleece to Fibre, based on the making of the Large Tree Group tapestry, is shown during the Edinburgh International Festival at the Dovecot Studios, Edinburgh. It toured thereafter to the Australian Tapestry Workshop, Melbourne; Inverness; and London. Commissioned portrait of Peter Higgs for the Royal Society of Edinburgh. Awarded a prestigious tapestry commission by the Worshipful Company of Leathersellers for the livery company's headquarters in the City of London.

In 2015 she became artist-in-residence at The Royal Drawing School Artist Studios, Dumfries House and the following year was commissioned to create a portrait of Dame Jocelyn Bell Burnell for the Royal Society of Edinburgh.

In 2017 Crowe designed The Leathersellers' Tapestry for the Dining Hall of the Leathersellers' Building in London. The forty metre-long tapestry was woven at Dovecot Tapestry Studios in Edinburgh. In 2018, she was awarded the Sir William Gillies Research Award by the Royal Scottish Academy supporting the making of a video projection responding to Schubert's Winterreise song cycle. Winterreise: A Parallel Journey, a collaboration with opera singer Matthew Rose and pianist Gary Matthewman, is performed at the Britten Studio, Snape Maltings, and at the Wigmore Hall, London.

In 2018, Victoria Crowe: Beyond Likeness was exhibited at the Scottish National Portrait Gallery and showcased over fifty portraits from the 1960s to the present. A commissioned portrait of HRH Prince Charles, the Duke of Rothesay was also unveiled there. Victoria Crowe: 50 Years of Painting was shown at the City Art Centre, Edinburgh. This major retrospective highlighted the artist's career from student work up until 2019.

== Honours ==
- 2004: Officer of the Order of the British Empire (OBE)
- 2009: Awarded Doctor Honoris Causa (DHC), University of Aberdeen
- 2010: Fellow of the Royal Society of Edinburgh
- Member of the Royal Scottish Academy

== Selected exhibitions ==
- 1989: Bruton Gallery, Bath
- 1991: Thackeray Gallery, London
- 1993: Bruton Gallery, Bath
- 1993: Ancrum Gallery, Borders Festival
- 1994: Thackeray Gallery, London
- 2000: A Shepherd's Life, Scottish National Portrait Gallery
- 2007: Plant Memory, Royal Scottish Academy
- 2009: Fine Art Society, London
- 2013: Fleece to Fibre, Dovecot Studios, Edinburgh
- 2018: Victoria Crowe: Beyond Likeness, Scottish National Portrait Gallery
- 2019: Victoria Crowe: 50 Years of Painting, City Art Centre, Edinburgh

== Collections ==
Crowe's work is held in a wide range of collections, including:

- National Galleries of Scotland: Portraits including Callum Macdonald (1996), Graham Crowden (1996) and Winifred Rushforth (1982)
- National Portrait Gallery, London: Portraits of Kathleen Raine (1986) and Dame Janet Vaughan (1986)
- Royal Scottish Academy
- National Trust for Scotland: Portrait of Lord Wemyss (1989)
- St John's College, Oxford: Portrait of Professor Bill Hayes (1991)
- National Museum of Scotland: Large Tree Group tapestry (2012), produced in collaboration with Dovecot Tapestry Studios, Edinburgh
- Royal Society of Edinburgh: Portraits of Dame Jocelyn Bell Burnell (2016) and Professor Peter Higgs (2013)
- St Catharine's College, Cambridge: Portrait of Professor David Ingram (2003)

== Bibliography ==
=== Monographs ===
- Crowe, Victoria and Walton, Michael, Victoria Crowe: Painted Insights, Antique Collectors Club, 2001
- Macmillan, Duncan. Victoria Crowe. Antique Collectors' Club Ltd, 2012.
- Mansfield, Susan, Macmillan, Duncan and Peploe, Guy. Victoria Crowe: 50 Years of Painting. Sansom & Co., 2019.

=== Further reading ===
- Crowe, Victoria and Robertson, Naomi, Victoria Crowe: The Leathersellers' Tapestry, The Leathersellers' Company, 2017
- Taubman, Mary, Lawson, Julie and Crowe, Victoria, A Shepherd's Life: Paintings of Jenny Armstrong by Victoria Crowe, Scottish National Portrait Gallery, 2018
- Macmillan, Duncan and Crowe, Victoria, Victoria Crowe: Beyond Likeness, Scottish National Portrait Gallery, 2019
- Mansfield, Susan and Spence, Alan, Catching the Light, The Scottish Gallery, 2019
