= Corsehill =

Corsehill may refer to:

- Barony and Castle of Corsehill in East Ayrshire, Scotland.
- Corsehill (stone), a type of building stone obtained from Corsehiil Quarry, Dumfries and Galloway, Scotland.
- Corse Hill, a hill located between East Renfrewshire and South Lanarkshire of Scotland
