= Archibald Lamont =

Scottish scientist and politician

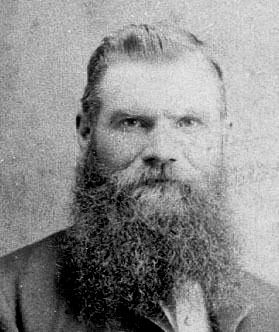
- Dr Archibald "Archie" Lamont FRSE FGS
- Born: 21 October 1907; Rothesay, Buteshire, Scotland
- Died: 16 March 1985 (aged 77); Carlops, Peeblesshire, Scotland
- Education: University of Glasgow

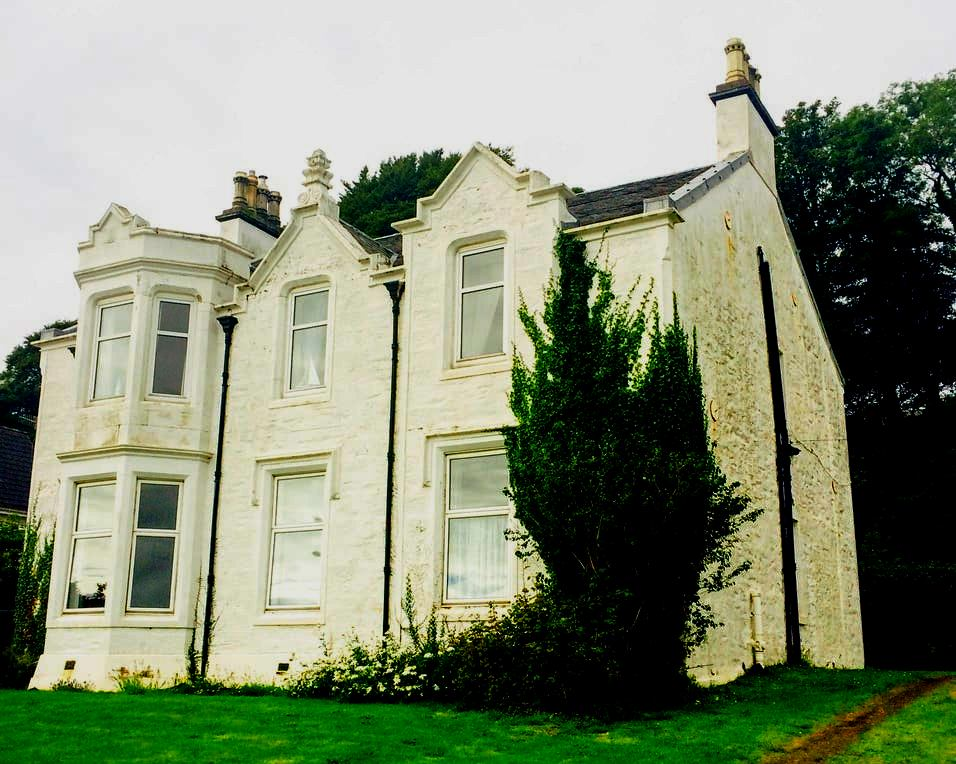
Ardbeg Villa, Rothesay, Bute - birthplace of Lamont.

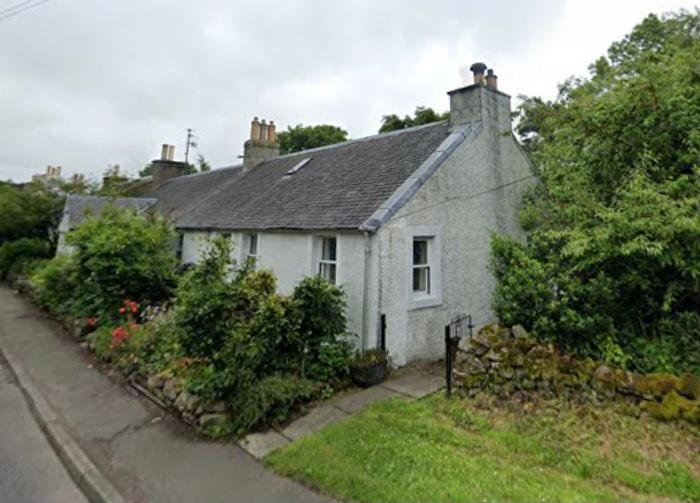
Jess Cottage in Carlops, Scottish Borders

Doctor Archibald "Archie" Lamont FRSE FGS (21 October 1907 – 16 March 1985) was a Scottish geologist, palaeontologist, Scottish Nationalist writer, poet and politician. He named the trilobite genus Wallacia after William Wallace.

== Early life and education ==
Born on 21 October 1907 at Ardbeg Villa, Ardbeg, Rothesay, Bute, the son of Barbara Mathie and lawyer John McNab Lamont OBE. He was educated at Port Bannatyne School and Rothesay Academy (1918–25). He studied science at the University of Glasgow graduating with an MA in 1928, a BSc in 1932 and, specialising in geology at postgraduate level, gained a doctorate (PhD) in 1935. He was active in the Glasgow University Scottish Nationalist Association and wrote extensively for the university magazine, under various pseudonyms. In the 1950s, he was active in the Scottish National Congress.

== Academic career ==
He began his academic career as assistant lecturer in 1936 and during the same year married Rose Bannatyne Mackinlay with whom he fathered a son they named Patrick John Coll Lamont. In 1944 he became lecturer in geology at the University of Birmingham and was then appointed Carnegie Research Fellow at the University of Edinburgh (1945–55).

Lamont was elected a Fellow of the Royal Society of Edinburgh on 6 March 1950, upon the proposal of Sir Edward B Bailey, Arthur Holmes, John G C Anderson and Frederick William Anderson.

He was also a Fellow of the Geological Society of London, and a member of the Edinburgh Geological Society and the Geological Society of Glasgow. Lamont retired from teaching at the age of 38 to live in the small village of Carlops, situated in the Pentland Hills, 15 miles (24 km) south of Edinburgh. He died on 16 March 1985.

== Taxonomic and paleontological work ==
Lamont discovered and named several taxa. For instance, Wallacia Lamont 1978, a monophyletic group of late Llandovery trilobite, was named for the famed Scottish knight, Sir William Wallace. Wallacia is one of the earliest Wenlock encrinurine trilobites from the Baltic area, the British Isles, and Canada. Wallacia is regarded as sister taxon to Encrinurus sensu stricto and includes at least ten named species.

Lamont's discoveries have been criticized for creating a "taxonomic mess", by describing genera based on "the basis of miserable scraps". He also published articles in his own Scottish Journal of Science, which is frowned upon in science as it has led to taxonomic vandalism.
