= Cauldstane Slap =

Mountain pass in West Lothian, Scotland

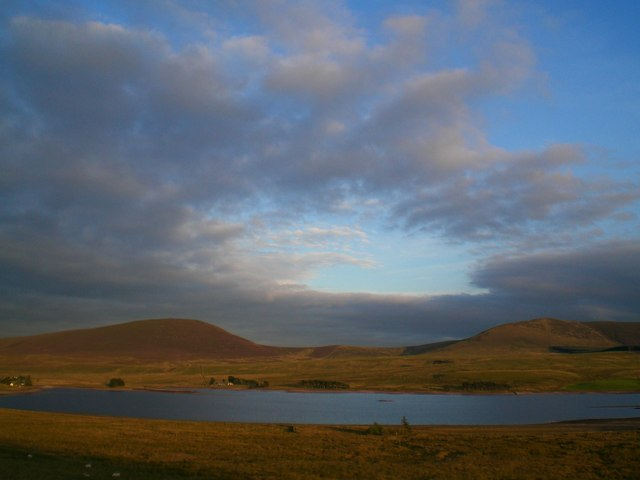
- Cauldstane Slap across Harperrig Reservoir

- Location within Scotland
- Elevation: 441 metres (1,447 ft)

Third Approach
- Location: West Lothian and Scottish Borders, Scotland
- Range: Pentland Hills
- Coordinates: 55°48′58″N 3°24′38″W

Cauldstane Slap is a pass located in the Pentland Hills of Scotland. It marks the border between the neighboring council areas of West Lothian and Scottish Borders and historically the border between Edinburghshire and Peeblesshire.

== Geography ==
About six kilometers southeast of the outskirts of Livingston, the Water of Leith is dammed off the western flank of the Pentland Hills to form the Harperrig Reservoir. From there, a path leads to Coldstane Slap, which marks the saddle point between West Cairn Hill and East Cairn Hill at an altitude of 441 meters. The trail continues in a south-southeast direction and meets the Baddinsgill Reservoir between Byrehope Mount and Mount Maw. The path follows the course of the outflowing Lyne Water to find its southeastern conclusion between Faw Mount and King Seat near West Linton. The entire pass over the Pentland Hills is around eight kilometers long.
