= South Black Hill =

Mountain in the United Kingdom

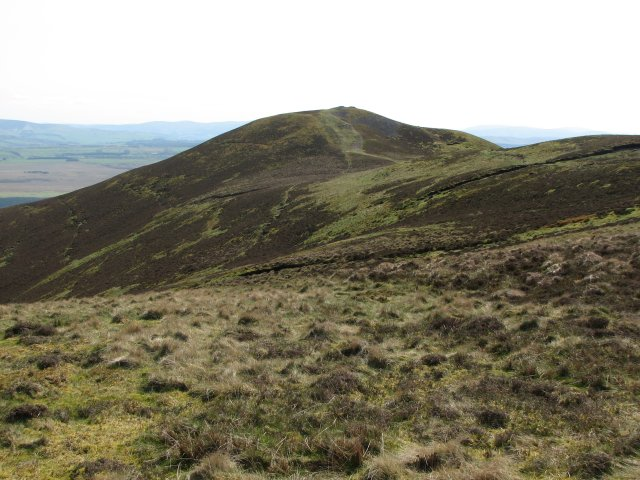

Highest point
- Elevation: 563 m (1,847 ft)
- Coordinates: 55°49′52″N 3°17′36″W

Geography
- Location: Midlothian, Scotland
- Parent range: Pentland Hills

South Black Hill is a hill in the Pentland Hills range of Scotland. It is located in the west of Midlothian on the east flank of the approximately 25 km (16 mi) long chain of hills. At 534m, South Black Hill is the fourth highest point in the Pentlands. It is four kilometers west of the small town of Penicuik and five kilometers north of the hamlet of Carlops. The neighboring hills are East and West Kip to the west and the Scald Law to the north.

== Surroundings ==
In the mid-19th century, bronze guns were reported to have been found between the Kips, Braid Law and South Black Hills near Eastside Farm. However, nothing is known about their whereabouts. A Neolithic ax with a length of 115 cm was found 500 m northeast in 2002.

There was probably a cross along the path between East Kip and Scald Law, on the slopes of South Black Hill. The 90 m × 85 m foundation was removed by a local farmer in the 19th century.

On a flat hill on the south-east flank are the remains of an Iron Age hillfort. It was used and expanded until the time of the Roman occupation of Britain. First, a wooden palisade secured the oval, 230 m × 175 m diameter complex. A second one was added later. A Roman road ran not far from the complex. Their course and destination are not clearly identified. However, it is thought to have been largely overlaid by what is now the A702, which runs along the eastern flank of the Pentland Hills.
