= Carnethy Hill =

Hill in Midlothian, Scotland

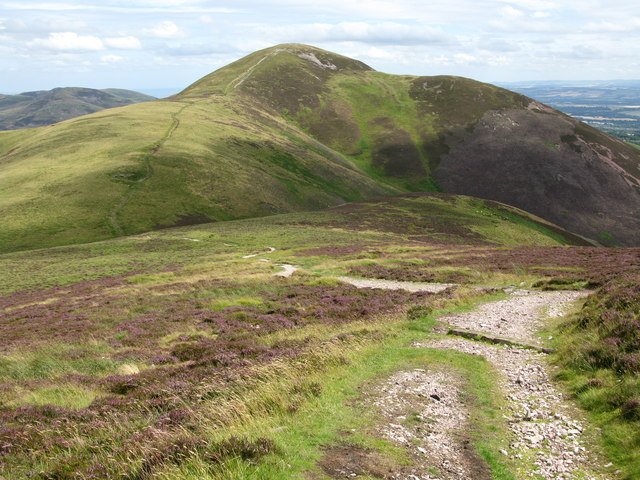
- Carnethy Hill from the path down Scald Law

Highest point
- Elevation: 573 m (1,880 ft)
- Prominence: c. 140 m (459 ft)
- Listing: HuMP
- Coordinates: 55.8437°N 3.2727°W

Geography
- Location within Scotland
- Location: Midlothian, Scotland
- Parent range: Pentland Hills
- OS grid: NT204619
- Topo map: OS Landranger 66

Climbing
- Easiest route: Hike

Carnethy Hill, the second highest of the Pentland Hills, is a hill 3 miles (5 km) north-west of Penicuik, Scotland.

It lends its name to the Carnethy 5 hill race held annually since 1971, and the Carnethy Hill Running Club. Loganlea Reservoir lies on the northwest flank of the hill.

== Etymology ==
Carnethy is probably etymologically a Cumbric name. The main suggestion in past scholarship is that it is cognate with Welsh carneddau, 'cairns'.
