= West Cairn Hill =

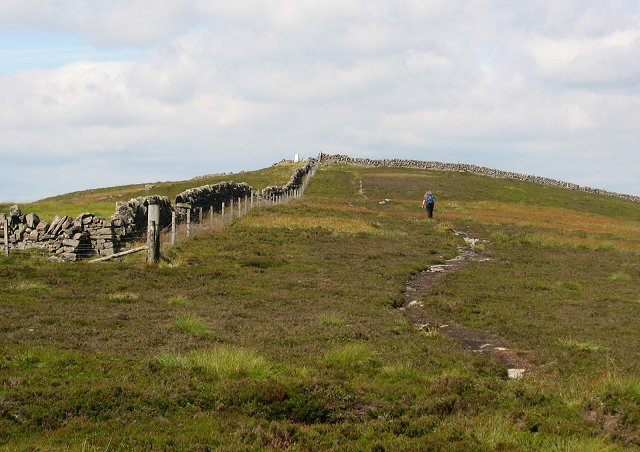

Highest point
- Elevation: 562 m (1,844 ft)
- Prominence: 132 m (433 ft)
- Coordinates: 55°48′38″N 3°25′33″W

Geography
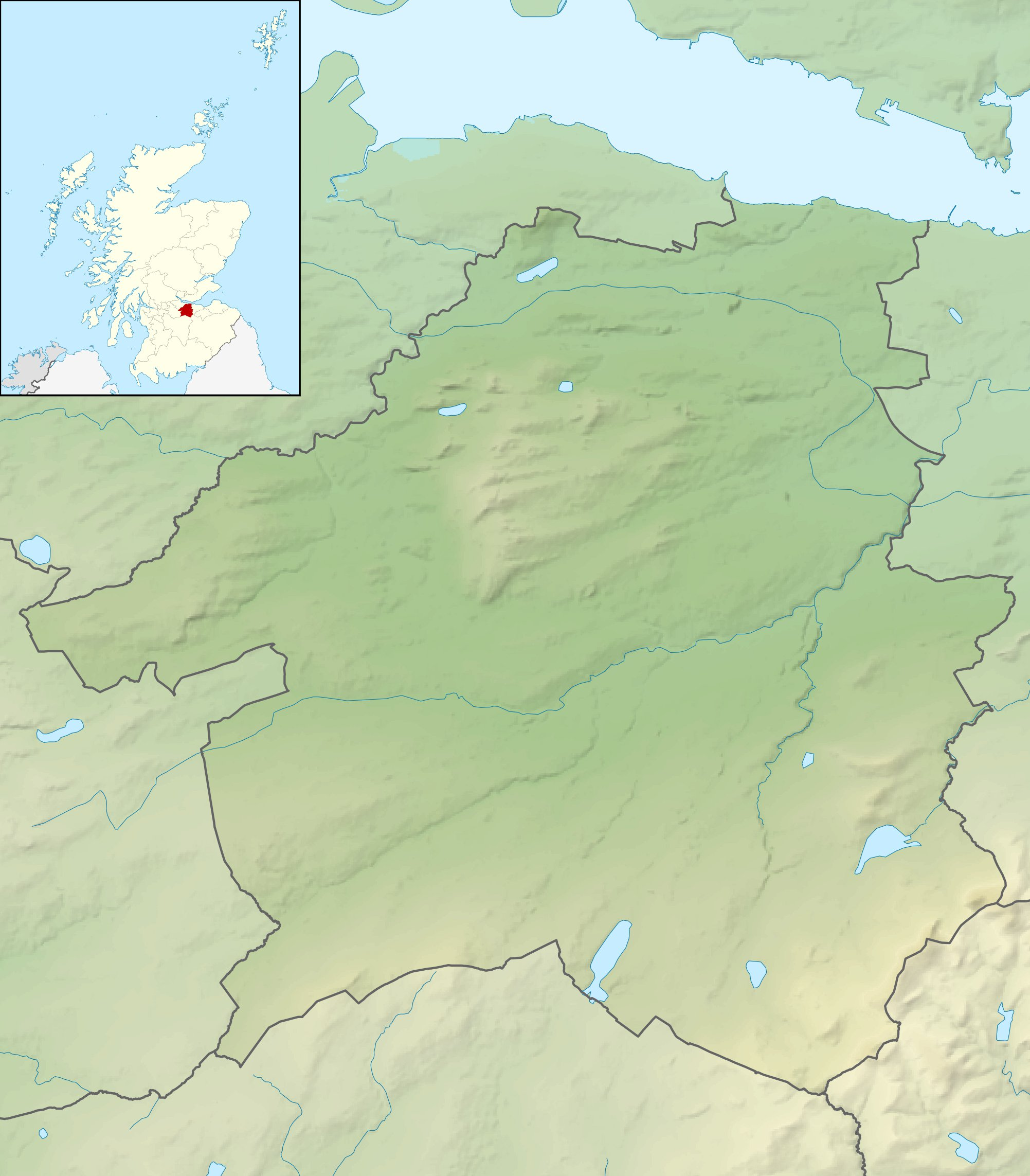
- Location within West Lothian Location within Scotland
- Location: Scottish Borders and West Lothian, Scotland
- Parent range: Pentland Hills

West Cairn Hill is a hill in the Pentland Hills range of Scotland. With a height of 562 m (1,844 ft), it is the fifth highest elevation and lies on the western flank of the approximately 20 mi (32 km) long chain of hills.

The border between the council areas of the Scottish Borders and West Lothian runs over the knoll. The closest settlement is the hamlet of Carlops around six kilometers to the southeast. West Calder is nine kilometers to the northwest and Penicuik is eleven kilometers to the east. The Cauldstane Slap pass runs at the saddle point between West and East Cairn Hill. The surrounding hills include Colzium Hill and Torweaving Hill in the southwest, East Cairn Hill in the northeast, and Wether Law in the east.

== Surroundings ==
The Cauldstane Slap, a formerly important pass route, runs between East and West Cairn Hill. With a maximum height of 441 m (1,447 ft), it connects West Lothian with the Scottish Borders.

There is a cairn on the top of the West Cairn Hills. This was badly disturbed and is still 13.7 m (45 ft) in diameter at a height of 1.1 m (3.6 ft). Border walls run through the cairn.

Upstream of the northwest flank is the Harperrig Reservoir. Established in 1860, the reservoir dams the water of the Water of Leith and serves both to supply Edinburgh with water and to regulate the flow of the Water of Leith.
