= Caerketton Hill =

Hill in City of Edinburgh, Scotland

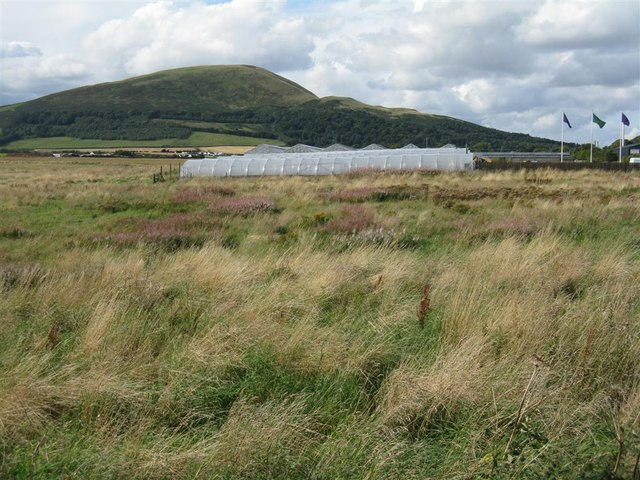

Highest point
- Elevation: 478 m (1,568 ft)
- Prominence: 63 m (207 ft)
- Coordinates: 55°52′59″N 3°13′17″W

Geography
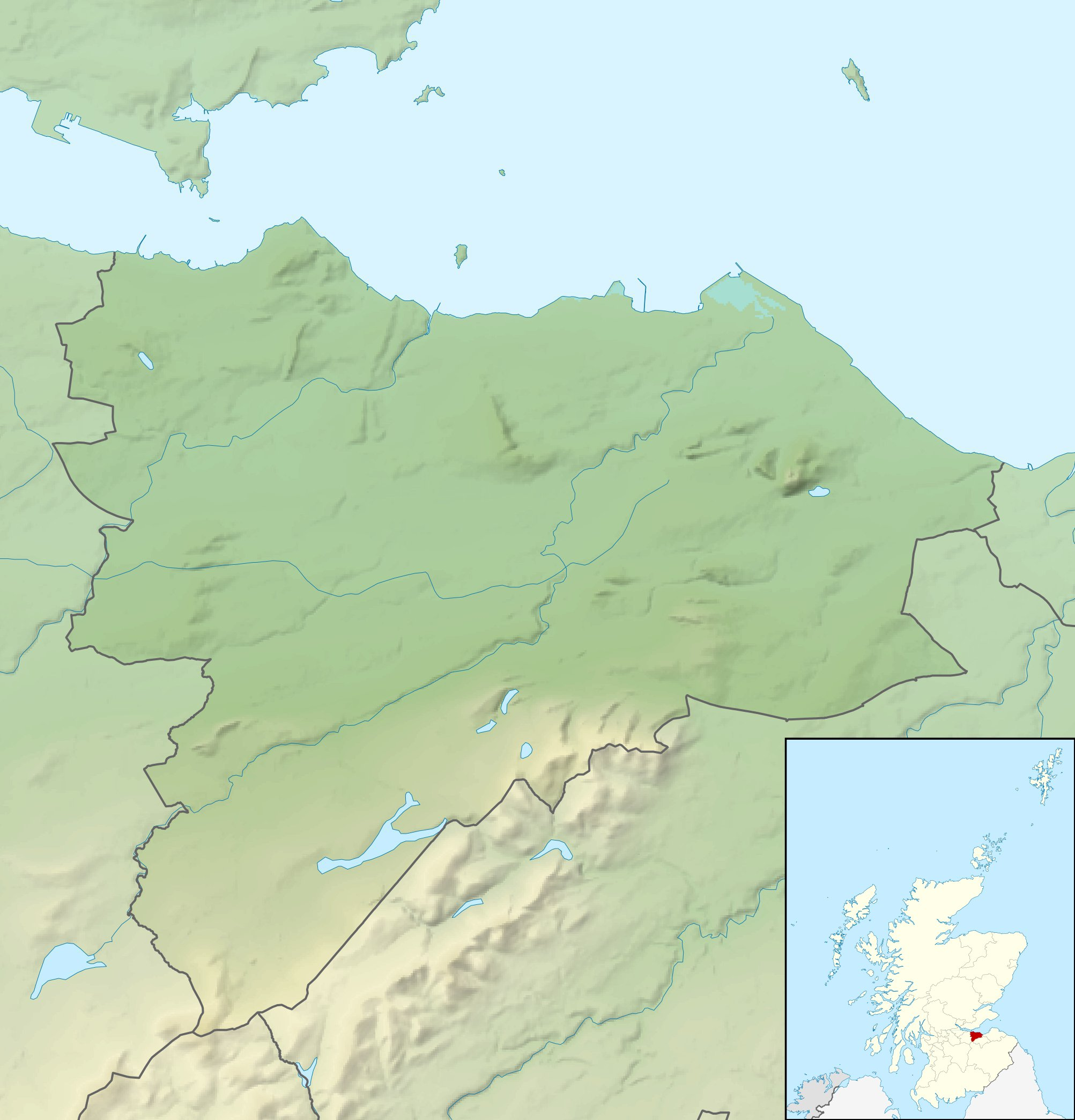
- Location within the City of Edinburgh council area Location within Scotland
- Location: City of Edinburgh council area and Midlothian, Scotland
- Parent range: Pentland Hills

Caerketton Hill (/kərˈkɛtən/ kər-KET-ən) is a hill in the Pentland Hills range of Scotland. Standing at 478 m, it is at the northeast end of the approximately 25 km (16 mi) long chain of hills on the border between the council areas of the City of Edinburgh and Midlothian. The nearest town is Loanhead, 2 kilometers to the east while Edinburgh's southern suburbs start about a kilometer to the north. The nearest hills are Allermuir Hill to the west and Woodhouselee Hill to the south. The Swanston Burn and Lothian Burn rise on the northern slopes while the Boghall Burn receives water from the southern slopes. Their waters meet in the Burdiehouse Burn and, eventually, as the Brunstane Burn, drain into the Firth of Forth at Eastfield, Edinburgh.

On the crest of the hill are the scattered remains of a cairn now consisting of small stones, 16 meters in diameter and 1.5 meter high. The cairn is protected as a scheduled monument.

== Surroundings ==
A flint arrowhead was discovered on the western flank of Caerketton Hill in 1970.

The remains of a hill fort can be found on a rocky outcrop almost ten meters high on the east flank. Located in a well-defended position, the facility was surrounded by at least one wall. There was a rampart on the west side. The fort is classified as a Scheduled Monument.

A dry ski run was installed on the north flank of the Caerketton Hill.
