= East Cairn Hill =

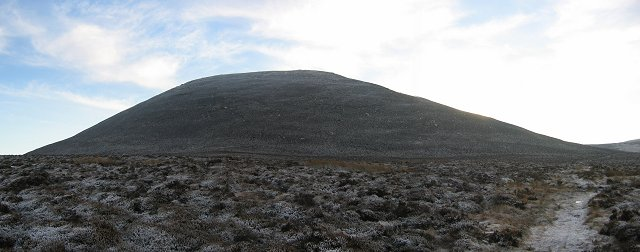

Highest point
- Elevation: 567 m (1,860 ft)
- Prominence: 169 m (554 ft)
- Listing: Ma
- Coordinates: 55°49′9″N 3°23′35″W

Geography
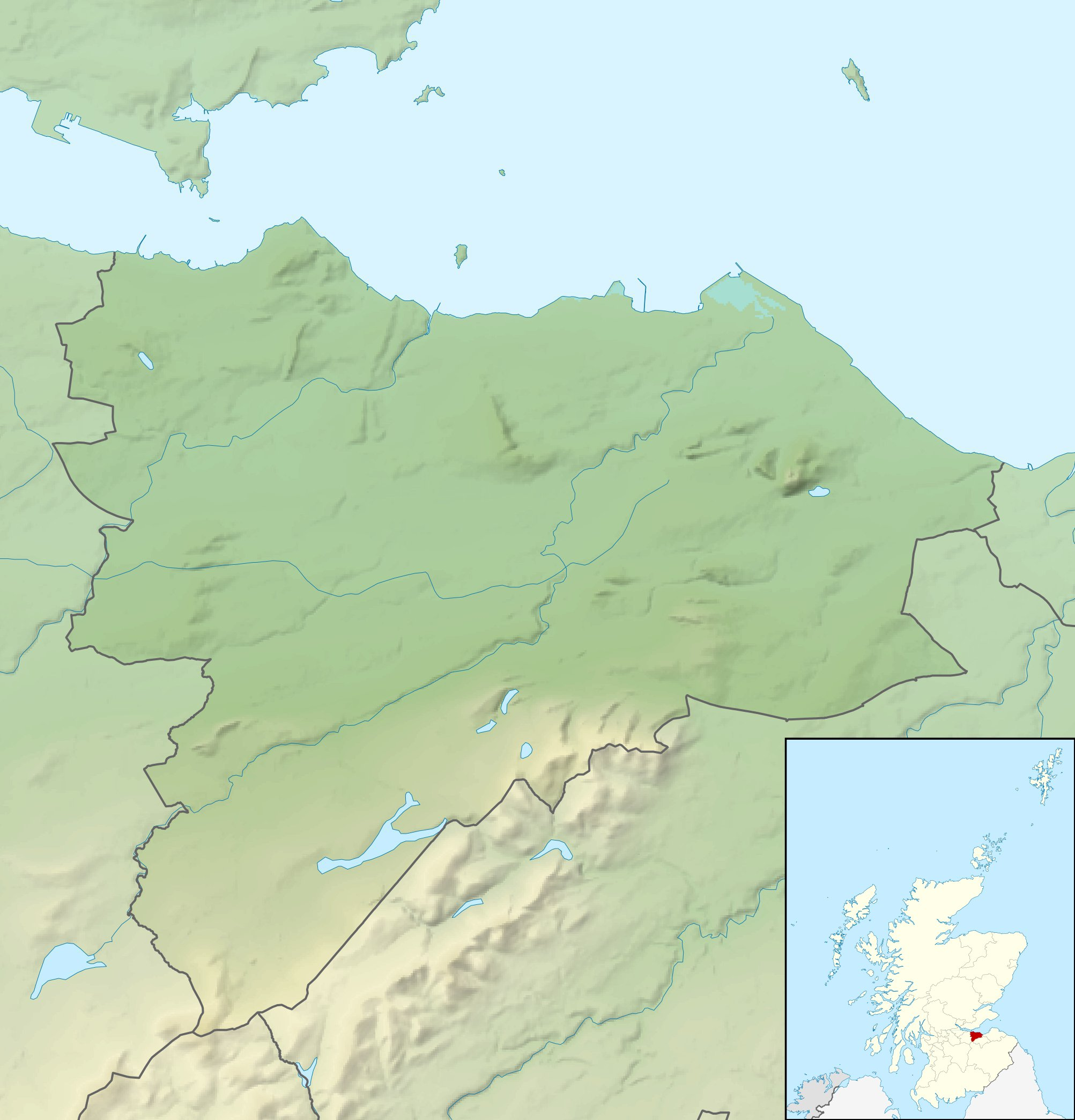
- Location within the City of Edinburgh council area Location within Scotland
- Location: Scottish Borders, City of Edinburgh council area and West Lothian
- Parent range: Pentland Hills

East Cairn Hill is a hill in the Pentland Hills range of Scotland. With a height of 567 m (1,860 ft), it is the highest hill in the City of Edinburgh council area and is located on the western flank of the approximately 20 mi (32 km) long chain of hills. The East Cairn Hill has two knolls, of which the higher one is on the east side and the 561 m (1,841 ft) high side knoll is 800 m (2,600 ft) to the west.

The borders of three council areas, Scottish Borders, West Lothian and City of Edinburgh meet at the top. The East Cairn Hill marks both the southernmost extension of the Edinburgh region and the easternmost point of West Lothian. The closest settlement is the hamlet of Carlops around six kilometers to the southeast. West Calder is nine kilometers to the northwest and Penicuik is eleven kilometers to the east. The Cauldstane Slap pass runs at the saddle point between West and East Cairn Hill. The surrounding hills include Wether Law in the southeast and West Cairn Hill in the southwest

== Surroundings ==
The Cauldstane Slap, a formerly important pass route, runs between East and West Cairn Hill. With a maximum height of 441 m (1,447 ft), it connects West Lothian with the Scottish Borders.

There is a cairn near the eastern crest of the East Cairn Hills. This measures 16.7 m (55 ft) at a height of two meters. The cairn was disturbed by a build-up. When it was opened again in the early 20th century, bone fragments and flint ax tips were found.

In front of the western flank is the Harperrig Reservoir. Established in 1860, the reservoir dams the water of the Water of Leith and serves both to supply Edinburgh with water and to regulate the flow of the Water of Leith.
