= Lanark Group =

- Stratigraphic range: Silurian to early Devonian epoch
- Type: Group
- Unit of: Old Red Sandstone Supergroup
- Sub-units: Greywacke Conglomerate Formation, Swanshaw Sandstone Formation, Pentland Hills Volcanic Formation
- Underlies: Strathclyde Group, Inverclyde Group
- Overlies: North Esk Group
- Thickness: up to around 2,500 m (8,200 ft)

Lithology
- Primary: sandstone
- Other: conglomerates, calc-alkaline volcanic extrusive rocks

Location
- Region: Midland Valley
- Country: Scotland
- Extent: southern part of the Scottish Midland Valley

Type section
- Named for: Lanark

The Lanark Group is a late Silurian to early Devonian lithostratigraphic group (a sequence of rock strata) in southern Scotland. The name is derived from the town of Lanark. It consists of sandstones and conglomerates within the Greywacke Conglomerate and Swanshaw Sandstone formations together with a wide range of igneous lithologies within the overlying Pentland Hills Volcanic Formation. The group is itself a division of the Old Red Sandstone Supergroup.

== Pentland Hills Volcanic Formation ==
The northern and eastern parts of the Pentland Hills, south of Edinburgh, are formed by a variety of rocks brought together within this formation. In stratigraphic order, i.e. youngest at top, they comprise the following 'volcanic members':

- Blackford Hill Volc. Mem.
- Braid Hills Volc. Mem.
- Fairmilehead Volc. Mem.
- Carnethy Hill Volc. Mem.
- Woodhouselee Volc. Mem.
- Caerketton Volc. Mem.
- Allermuir Volc. Mem.
- Capelaw Volc. Mem.
- Bell's Hill Volc. Mem.
- Bonaly Volc. Mem.
- Warklaw Hill Volc. Mem.
- Torduff Hill Volc. Mem.

Each is named from a locality where it is to be found within the Pentland range or within the city of Edinburgh.
