= Hillend, Midlothian =

Coordinates: 55.886°N 3.198°W

Hillend: Scottish Gaelic: Ceann a' Chnuic
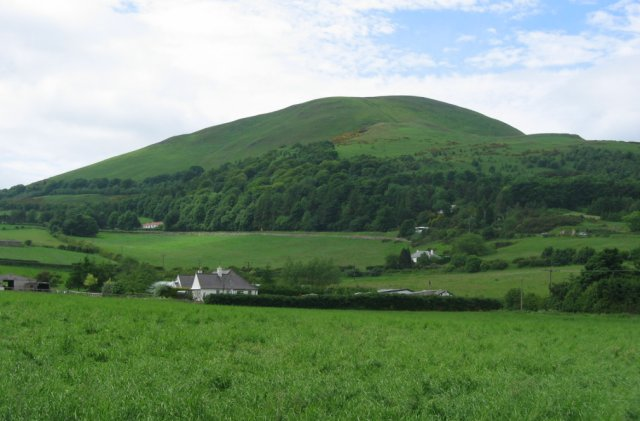
- Looking towards the Pentland Hills from Hillend

- Location within Midlothian Location indicating proximity to the City of Edinburgh council area
- OS grid reference: NT251665
- Council area: Midlothian
- Lieutenancy area: Midlothian
- Country: Scotland
- Sovereign state: United Kingdom
- Post town: EDINBURGH
- Postcode district: EH10
- Dialling code: 0131
- Police: Scotland
- Fire: Scottish
- Ambulance: Scottish
- UK Parliament: Midlothian
- Scottish Parliament: Midlothian North and Musselburgh

Hillend is a small hamlet in Midlothian, Scotland. Lying just south of Edinburgh, it is close to the boundary between Midlothian and the City of Edinburgh council area (partly denoted by the A720 Edinburgh City Bypass road) and takes its name from being situated at the end of the Pentland Hills.

It was the site of a fort, but all the stone has been removed and the land is now cultivated.

Today, Hillend is best known for the Midlothian Snowsports Centre (formerly the Hillend Ski Centre), an artificial ski slope. Swanston Golf Course and Lothianburn Golf Course are located nearby. The terrain is well suited to paragliding and is flyable in NE and SE winds, although care needs to be taken when landing in the relatively small landing field. It is also a well known camping spot among teenagers from Edinburgh.
