= Midlothian Snowsports Centre =

Dry ski slope in Scotland

Midlothian Snow Sports Centre, Hillend
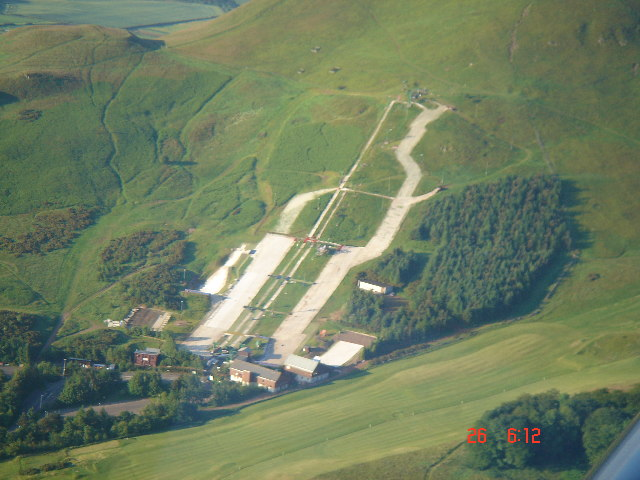
- Midlothian Snow Sports Centre
- Interactive map of Midlothian Snow Sports Centre, Hillend
- Former names: Hillend Ski Centre
- Address: Biggar Road, Edinburgh, EH10 7DU
- Location: Hillend, Midlothian, Scotland
- Coordinates: 55°53′14.36″N 3°12′40.42″W
- Owner: Midlothian Council
- Type: Dry ski-slope and snowsports centre

Construction
- Opened: 1960s
- Renovated: 2008

Website
- http://ski.midlothian.gov.uk/

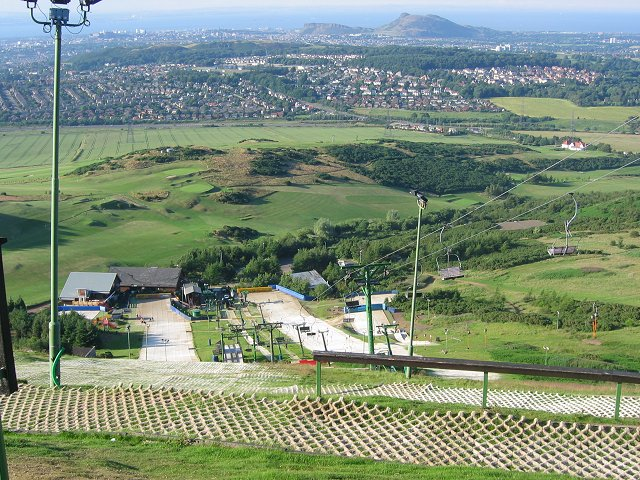
Downhill view, with Edinburgh and Arthur's Seat in the distance

The Midlothian Snowsports Centre, formerly the Hillend Ski Centre and still often referred to as simply Hillend, is the second longest dry ski slope in Europe, situated near Hillend near Edinburgh, Scotland.

Lying in the Pentland Hills just outside the Edinburgh city limits, the centre is operated by Midlothian Council. Used for skiing, snowboarding and snowblading, it is a national training centre for Scottish Olympians; 29 have been trained there as of 2010 including Finlay Mickel, a former British number one downhill skier. Additionally, the centre provides both lessons and recreational use for adults and children all year round.

An outdoor facility, all runs are made of matting that is suitable for year-long use, and floodlighting allows the slopes to be used in the evenings. A misting system ensures the slopes remain lubricated to increase speed and to create a more realistic surface.

It has two main slopes, both of which are accessed from the top of the long tow and chairlift. It also houses a 20m nursery slope next to the café 360, two combined 20m nursery slopes positioned next to a premium tubing set-up which both include magic carpet style uplifts, and also a jump slope. Uplift to the main slopes is provided by a chairlift and two button lifts.

== History ==
In October 1966, plans were announced to use the artificial ski slope at Hillend for a scheme to select candidates for ski instructor courses.

In 2010, the centre faced closure due operating at a loss and with Midlothian Council facing funding shortages. In March 2010, with losses of half a million pounds a year, and with fewer than 20% of the centre's users coming from Midlothian, a five-month cost-cutting plan was implemented, with the council due to consider either sale or lease by August 2010. A Facebook group campaigning to save the centre attracted 26,000 members. The council duly agreed a plan to keep the centre open, involving £600,000 of investment being spent on it by Sportscotland, and the sale of green belt land near the site to developers.

In 2019, Midlothian Council applied for planning permission to extend use of the site, hoping to add leisure facilities such as a zipline, alpine coaster and soft play, as well as tourist accommodation, retail and restaurants. This work began in 2023.
