= Brimmond Hill =

Coordinates: 57.172335°N 2.238501°W

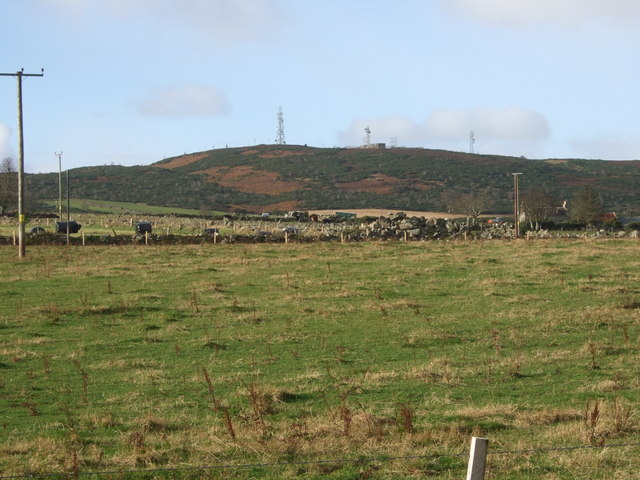
- Brimmond Hill

Highest point
- Elevation: 266 m (873 ft)
- Prominence: 159 m (522 ft)
- Listing: Marilyn

Geography
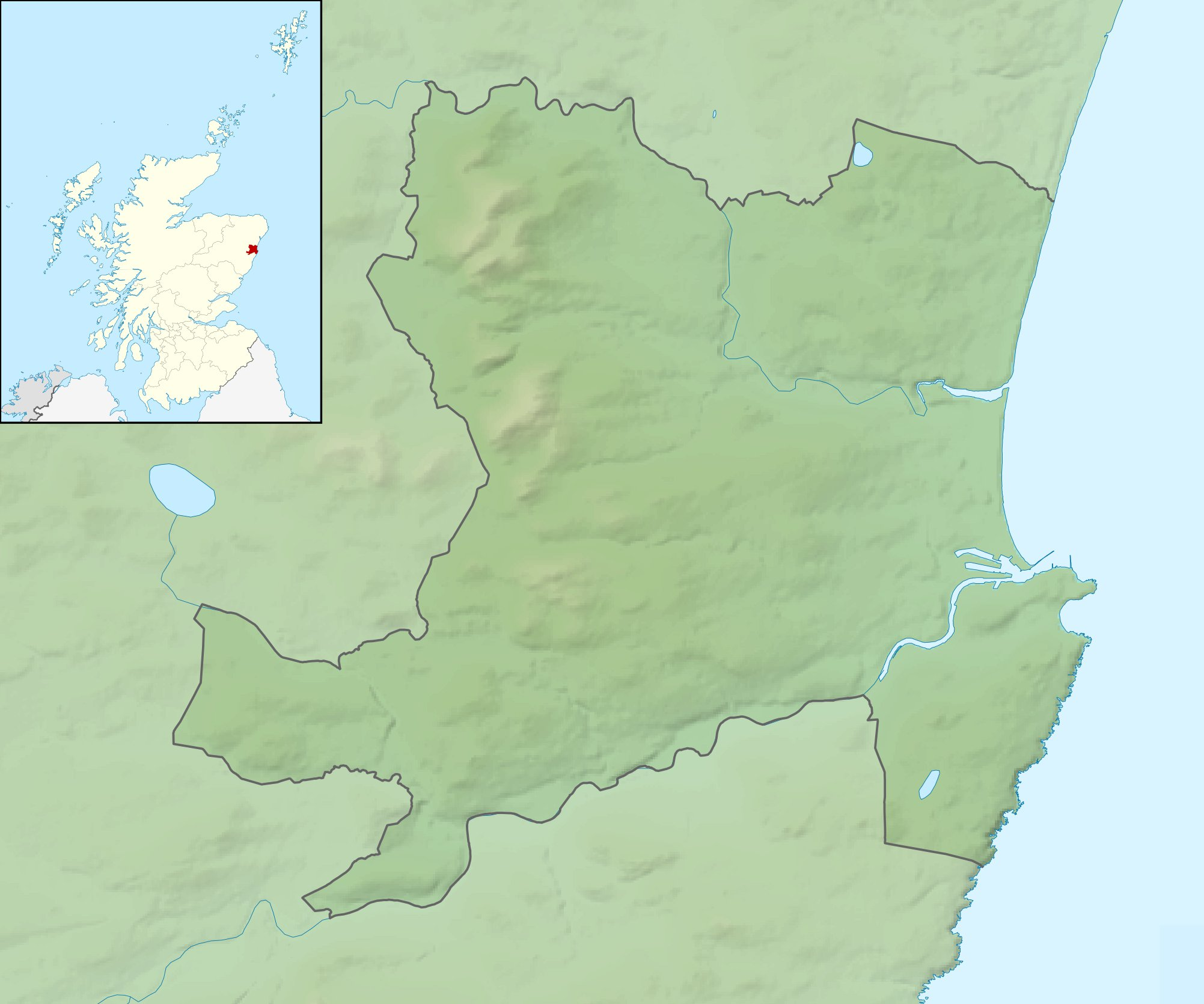
- Location within Aberdeen City council area
- Location: Aberdeen, Scotland
- OS grid: NJ856091
- Topo map: OS Landranger 38, Explorer 406

Brimmond Hill is a hill in Aberdeen, Scotland. The summit is the highest point within the Aberdeen City council area, at an elevation of 266 m (873 ft).

The hill itself is situated in the area between Kingswells, Westhill, Blackburn and Dyce. There is a transmitter on the top of the hill, and there are also paths and a road to the top of the hill. The hill can be reached directly from paths that connect to Kingswells, and at the summit a view across the city of Aberdeen is available.

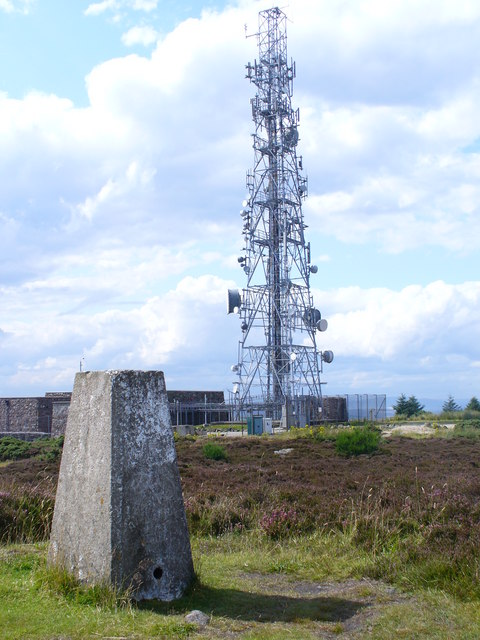
Transmitter on top of the hill

== Transmitter site ==
The top of the hill has a collection of transmitter sites for microwave transmission, by line-of-sight communication. The communication sites from here have direct links between North Sea Oil platforms and their headquarters in Aberdeen.

== See also ==
- List of Scottish council areas by highest point
- British Telecom microwave network
