= Castle Law =

Iron Age hill fort in Midlothian, Scotland

Coordinates: 55°51′42.62″N 3°14′0.37″W

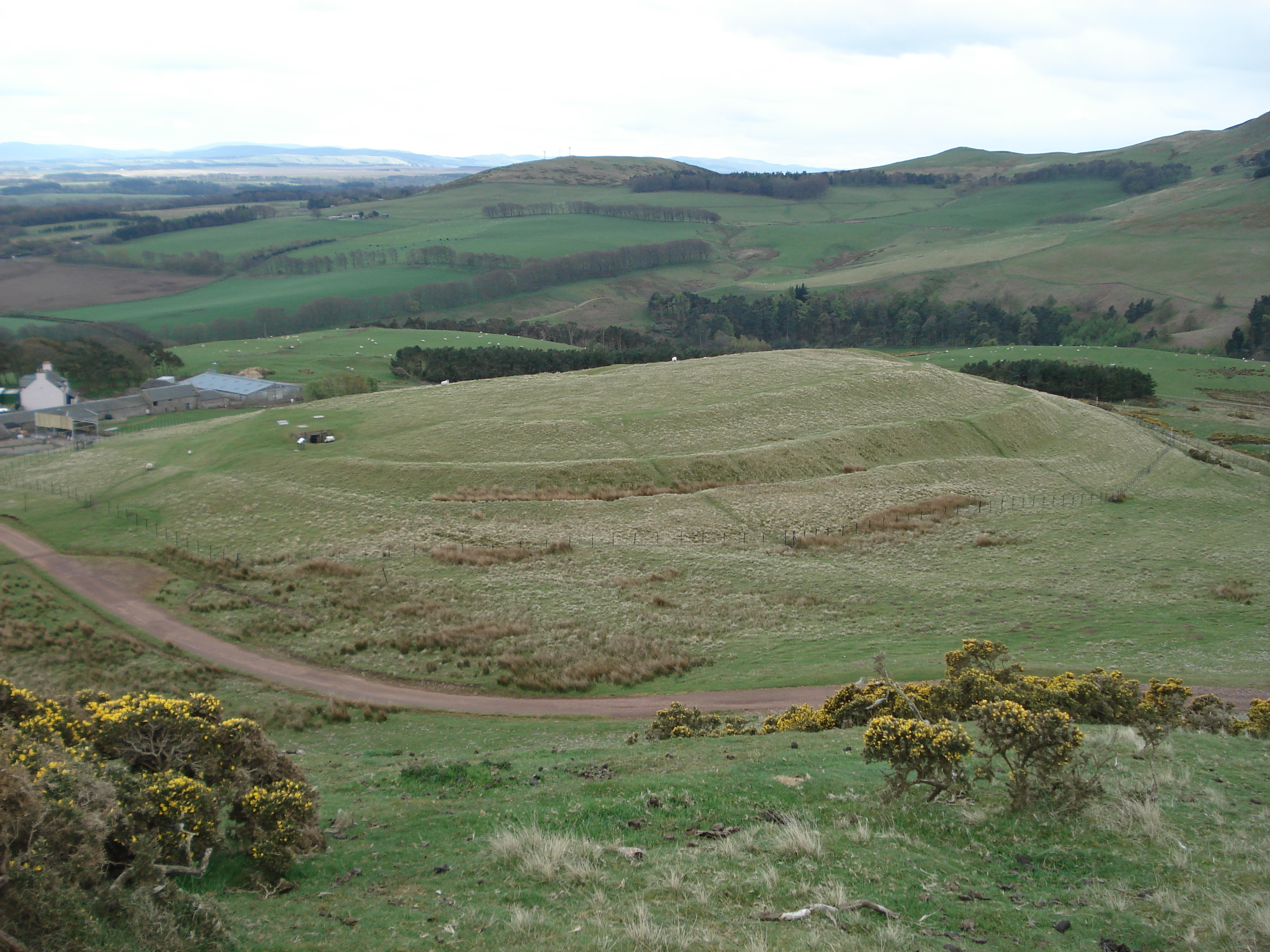
- The Hillfort of Castlelaw

Highest point
- Elevation: 1,601 ft (488 m)

Geography
- Location within Scotland
- Location: Midlothian, Scotland, United Kingdom
- Parent range: Pentland Hills

Castle Law is a hill south west of Fairmilehead in the Pentland Hills in Midlothian, Scotland.

It is best known for the Iron Age hill fort on its slopes.

== The Castlelaw Hill Fort ==
The Castlelaw Hill Fort is the remnant of a stronghold of the Iron Age. When it was occupied the site consisted of three earthwork ramparts, ditches and timber palisades. The fort contained a Souterrain for the storage of agricultural produce. V. Gordon Childe undertook excavations at Castlelaw in 1932–33. The work focused on the rampart, and showed that it consisted of a clay and timber filling, faced by stone.

The fort commands views over the Forth and Lothian. Traprain Law and Berwick Law, both significant centres of power in the Iron Age, are visible from the site.

The fort is maintained by Historic Environment Scotland as a scheduled monument.

Access to the site is free but, since the area is an active sheep pasture, dogs should be kept under control. The site also neighbours an army firing range and so care should be taken not to pass into the area marked by red flags.
