= Nine Mile Burn =

Coordinates: 55.805°N 3.313°W

Nine Mile Burn: Scottish Gaelic: Allt nan Naoi Mìle
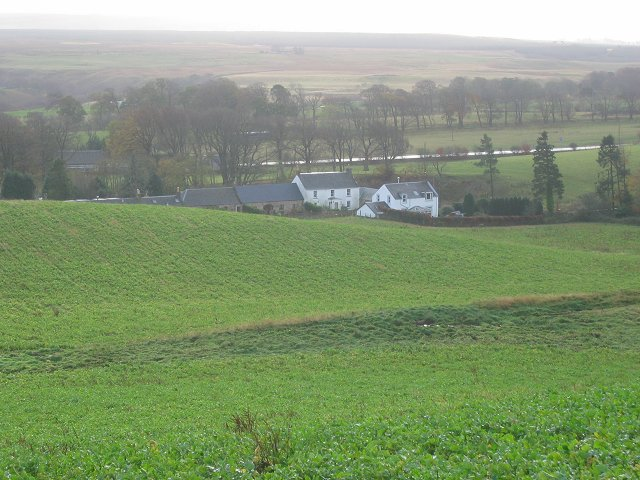
- Nine Mile Burn

- Location within Midlothian
- OS grid reference: NT175576
- Council area: Midlothian
- Lieutenancy area: Midlothian
- Country: Scotland
- Sovereign state: United Kingdom
- Post town: PENICUIK
- Postcode district: EH26
- Dialling code: 01968
- Police: Scotland
- Fire: Scottish
- Ambulance: Scottish
- UK Parliament: Midlothian
- Scottish Parliament: Midlothian South, Tweeddale and Lauderdale

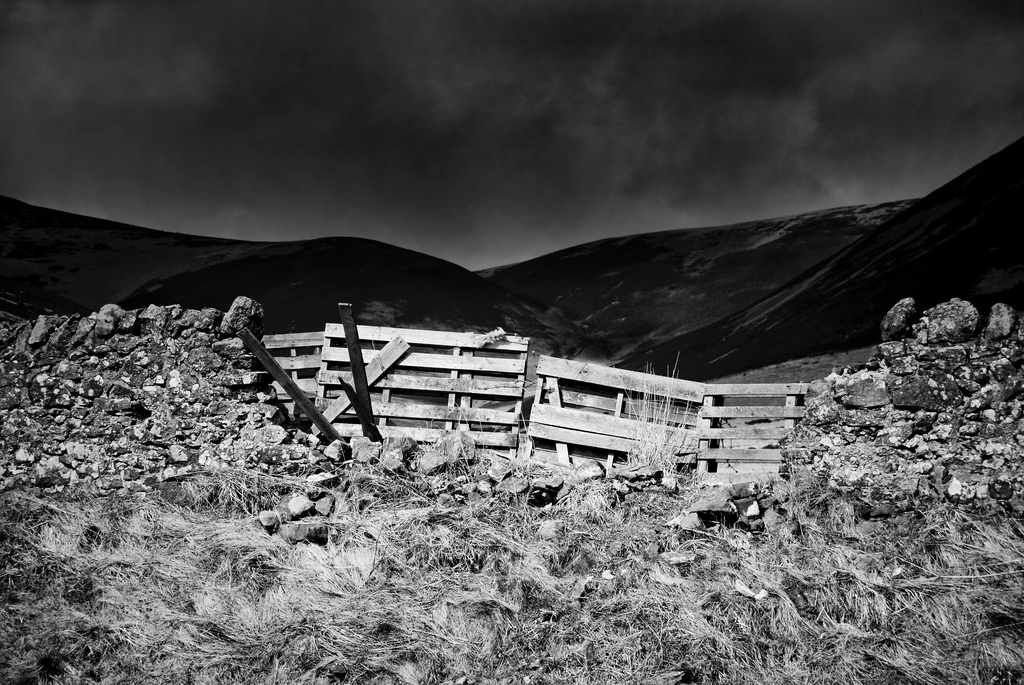
Pentland hills near Nine Mile Burn on the A702

Nine Mile Burn is a hamlet in Midlothian, Scotland, the last in Midlothian when heading south on the A702 road.

It is located at the foot of the Pentland Hills, near Penicuik and about 2 km north-east of the village of Carlops.
