= Corse Hill =

Hill in Scotland

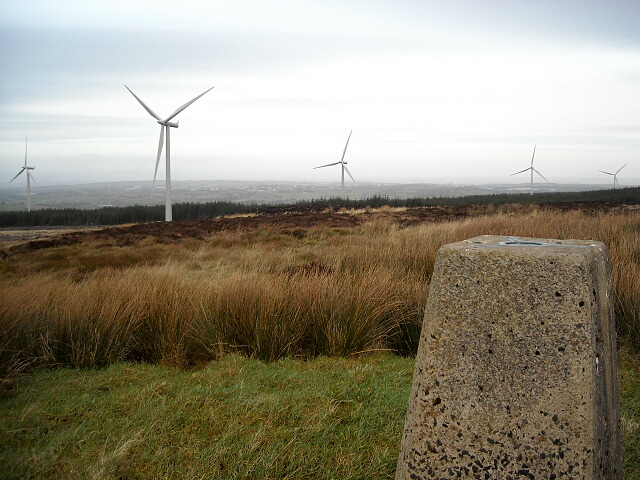

Highest point
- Elevation: 376 m (1,234 ft)
- Prominence: 173 m (568 ft)
- Listing: Ma
- Coordinates: 55°41′28.50″N 4°13′52.93″W

Geography
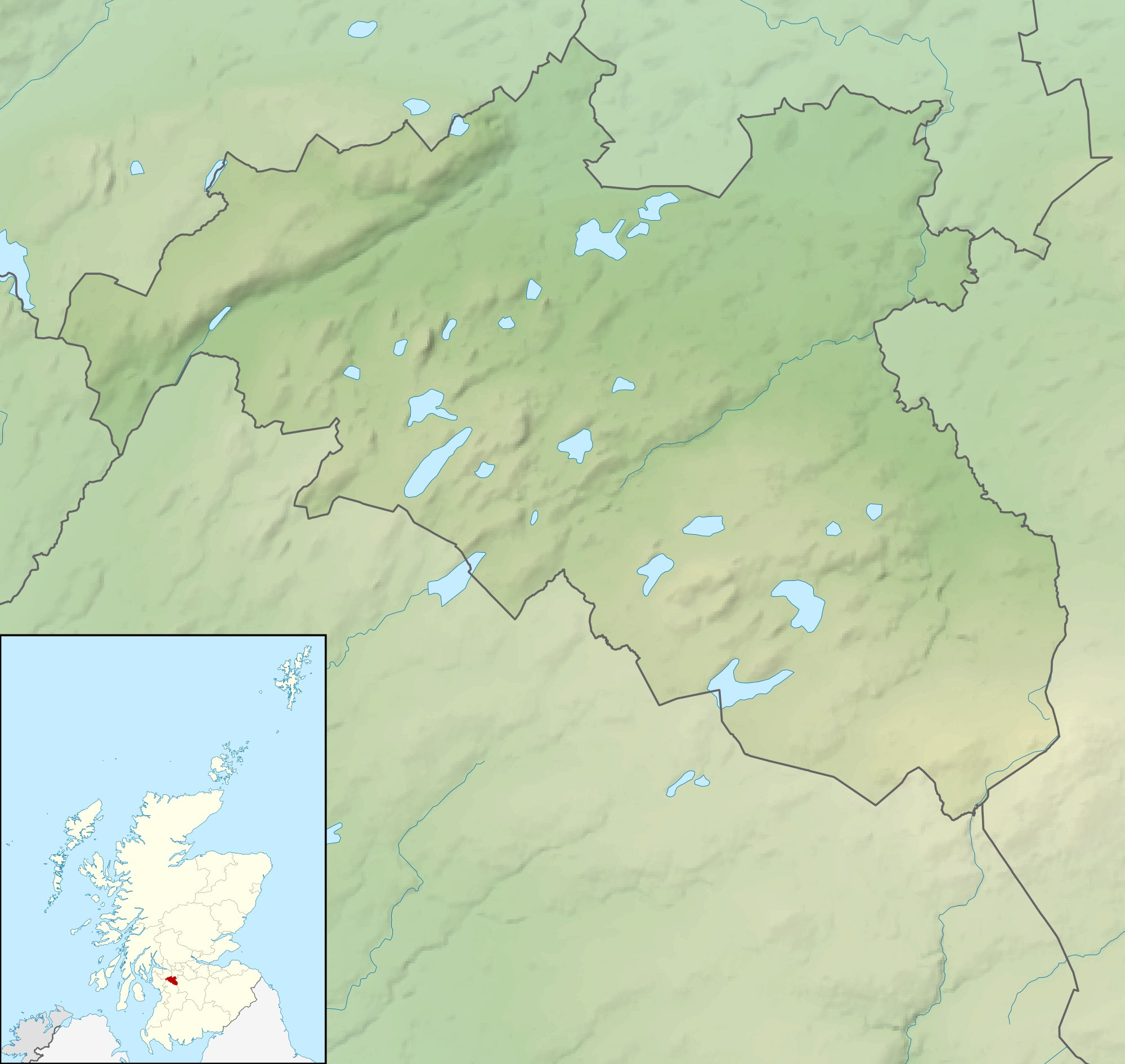
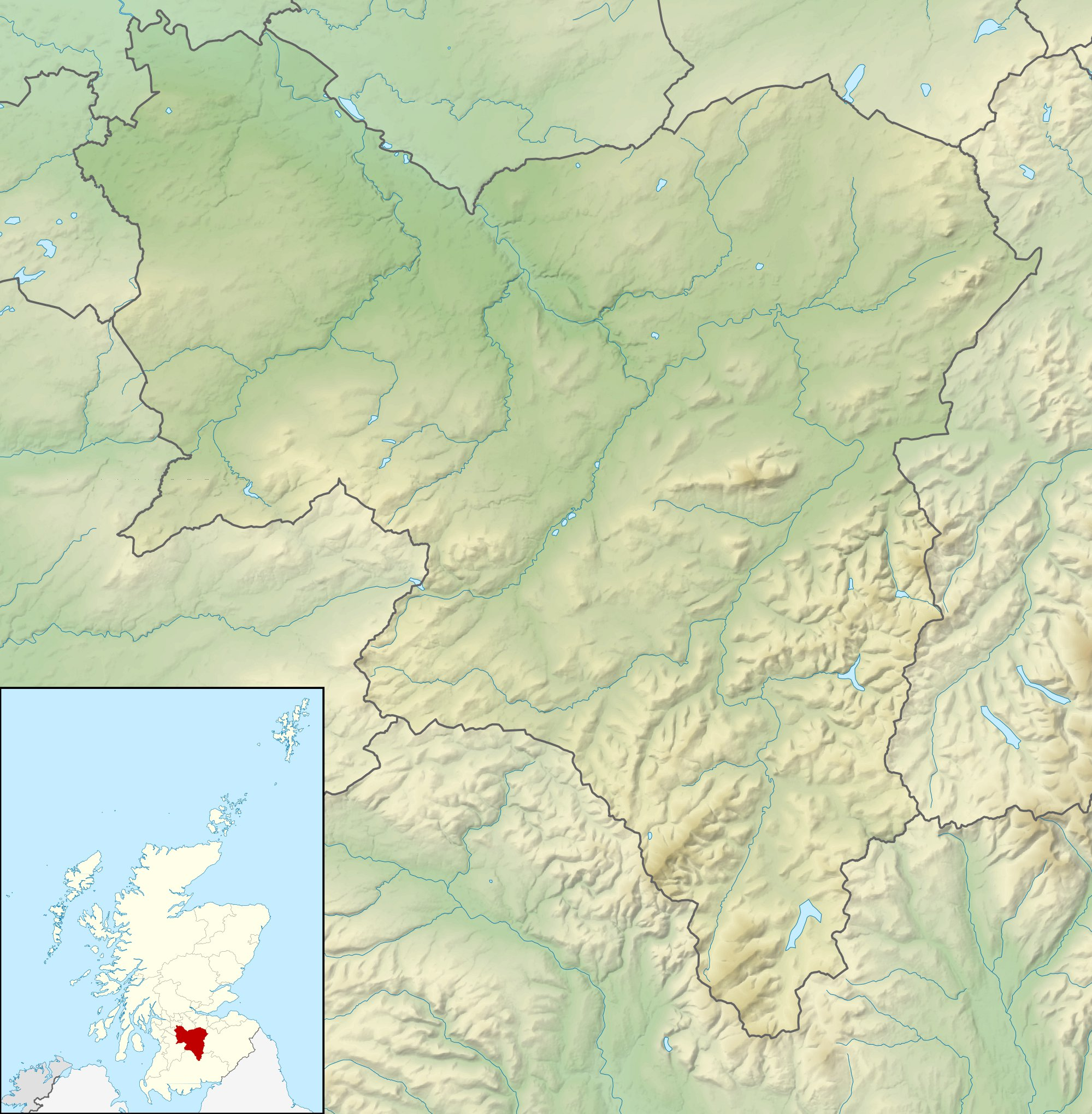
- Location within East Renfrewshire Location within South Lanarkshire Location within Scotland
- Location: East Renfrewshire and South Lanarkshire, Scotland

Corse Hill is a hill located between East Renfrewshire and South Lanarkshire of Scotland. With a height of 376 m (1,234 ft), it is the highest point in East Renfrewshire.
