= Silverburn, Midlothian =

Coordinates: 55.829°N 3.273°W

Silverburn: Scottish Gaelic: Allt an Airgid; Scots: Sillerburn
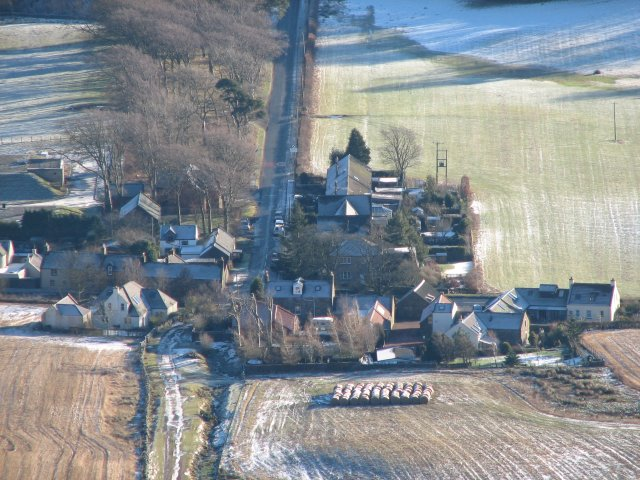
- An aerial view of Silverburn

- Location within Midlothian
- OS grid reference: NT202602
- Council area: Midlothian
- Lieutenancy area: Midlothian
- Country: Scotland
- Sovereign state: United Kingdom
- Post town: PENICUIK
- Postcode district: EH26
- Dialling code: 01968
- Police: Scotland
- Fire: Scottish
- Ambulance: Scottish
- UK Parliament: Midlothian
- Scottish Parliament: Midlothian South, Tweeddale and Lauderdale

Silverburn is a small hamlet near Penicuik, in Midlothian, south-east Scotland. It has a small community centre, with a garden surrounding the hall, which featured on the BBC Television programme The Beechgrove Garden in June 2008. It has a small population of just over 60 and is about 8 miles south of Edinburgh.
