= Scald Law =

Hill in Midlothian, Scotland

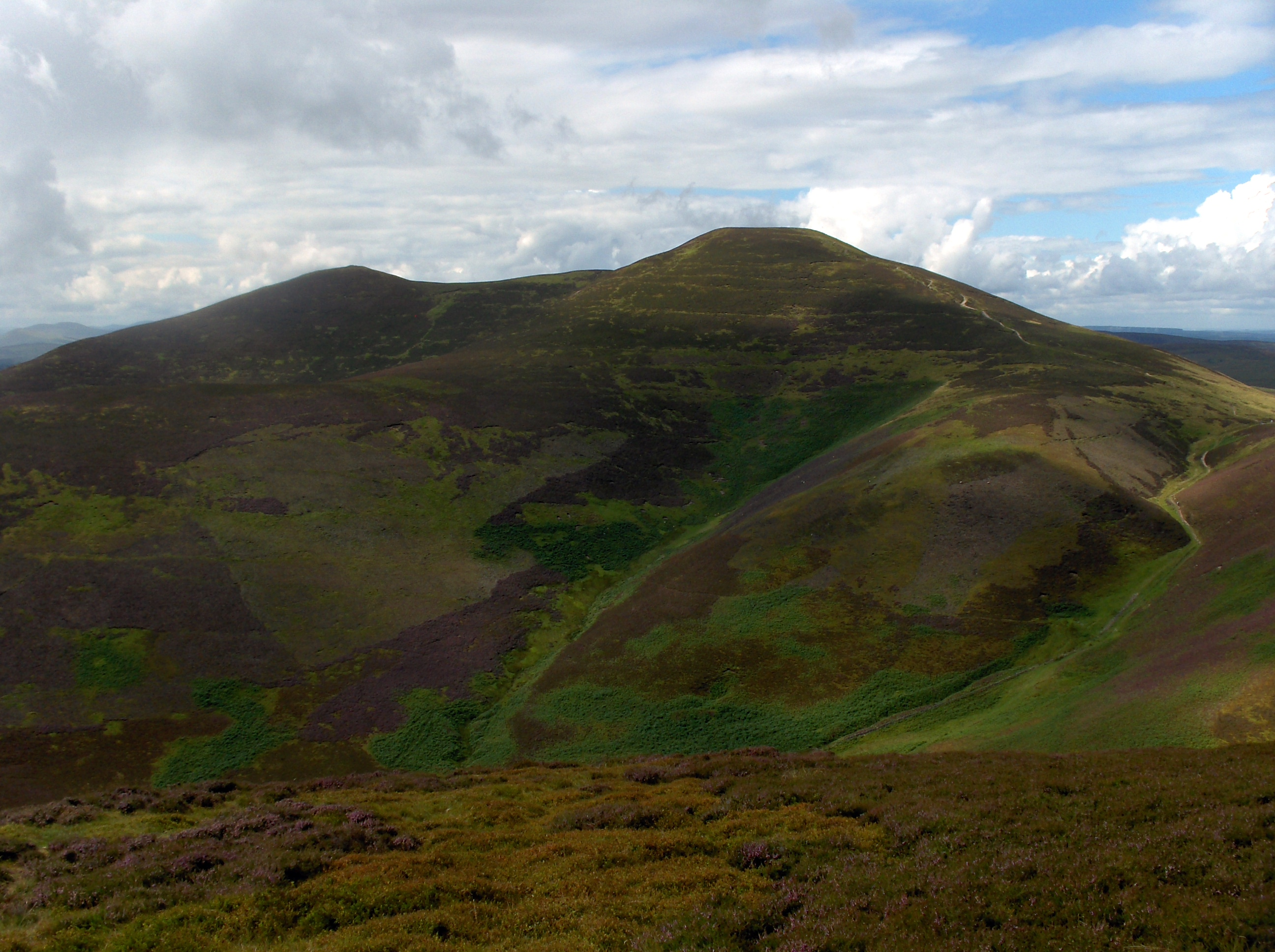
- Scald Law as seen from the northeast

Highest point
- Elevation: 579 m (1,900 ft)
- Prominence: c. 312 metres (1,024 ft)
- Listing: Marilyn, Hardy
- Coordinates: 55.8357°N 3.2901°W

Geography
- Location: Midlothian, Scotland
- OS grid: NT191610
- Topo map: OS Landranger 65

Climbing
- Easiest route: Hike

Scald Law is a hill in Midlothian, Scotland. At 579 metres (1,900 ft) it is the highest of the Pentland Hills. The hill is composed of Devonian volcanic rock.

== Etymology ==
The origin of the name is uncertain. Some sources say it derives from the Scots word scawed, meaning "bare." Another explanation is that it derives from scaldberry, an old name for blackberry. The word law is derived from the Old English for hill.
