= Pentland Hills =

Scottish hill range and regional park

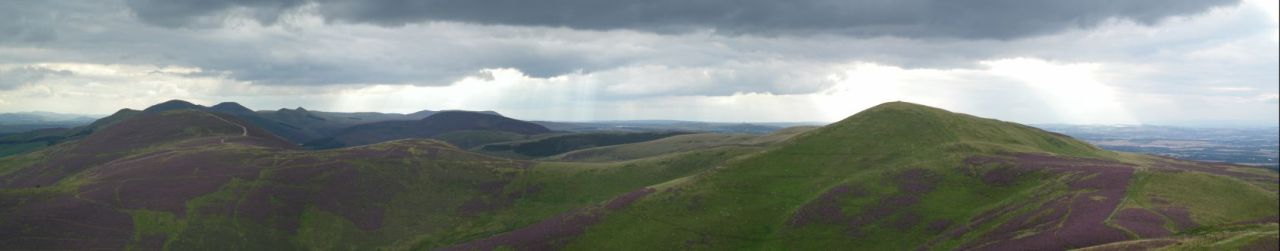
- The Pentland Hills seen from Caerketton Hill

Highest point
- Peak: Scald Law
- Elevation: 579 m (1,900 ft)
- Prominence: 312
- Coordinates: 55°48.5′N 03°22.5′W

Dimensions
- Length: 32 km (20 mi)

Geography
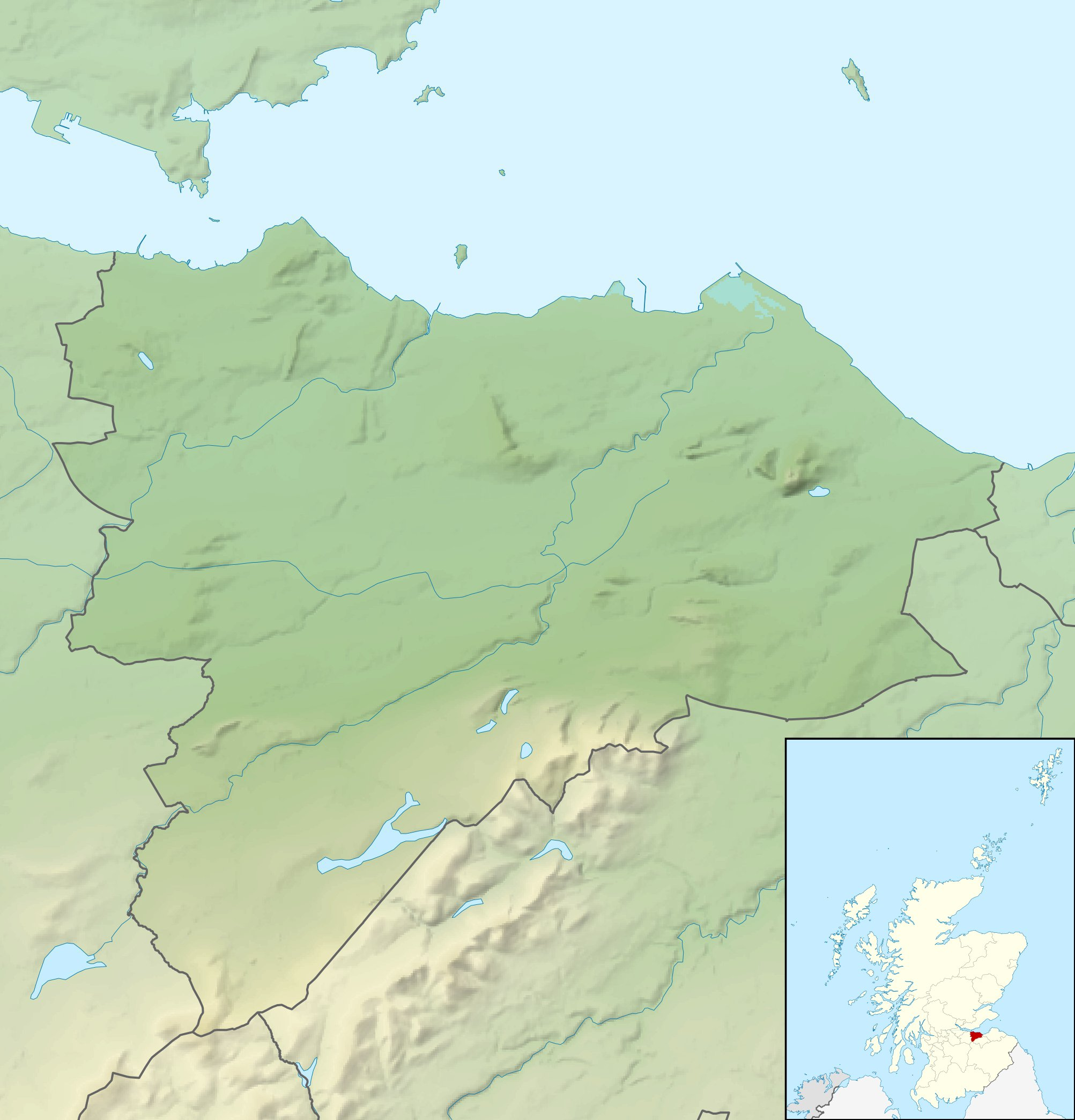
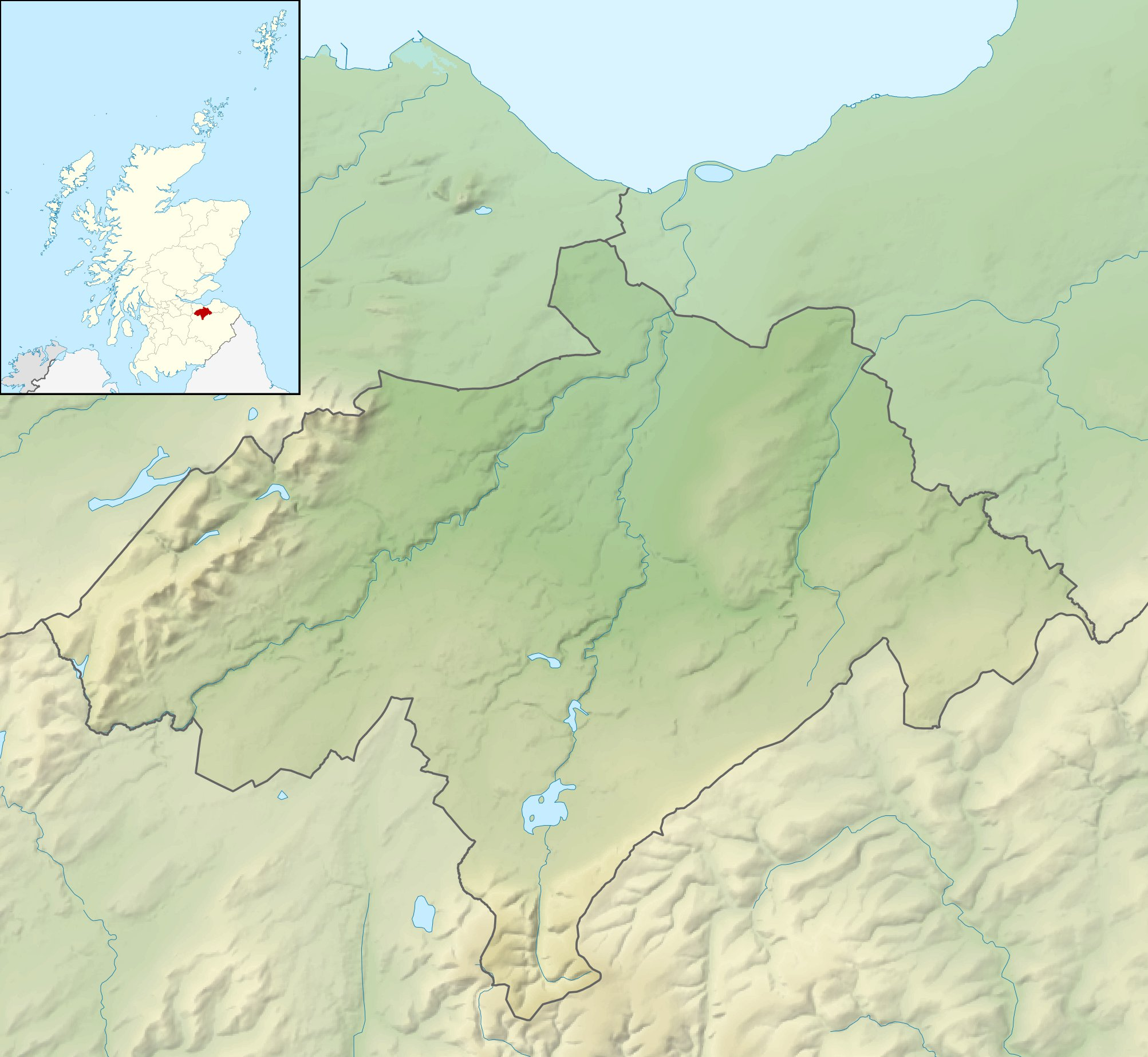
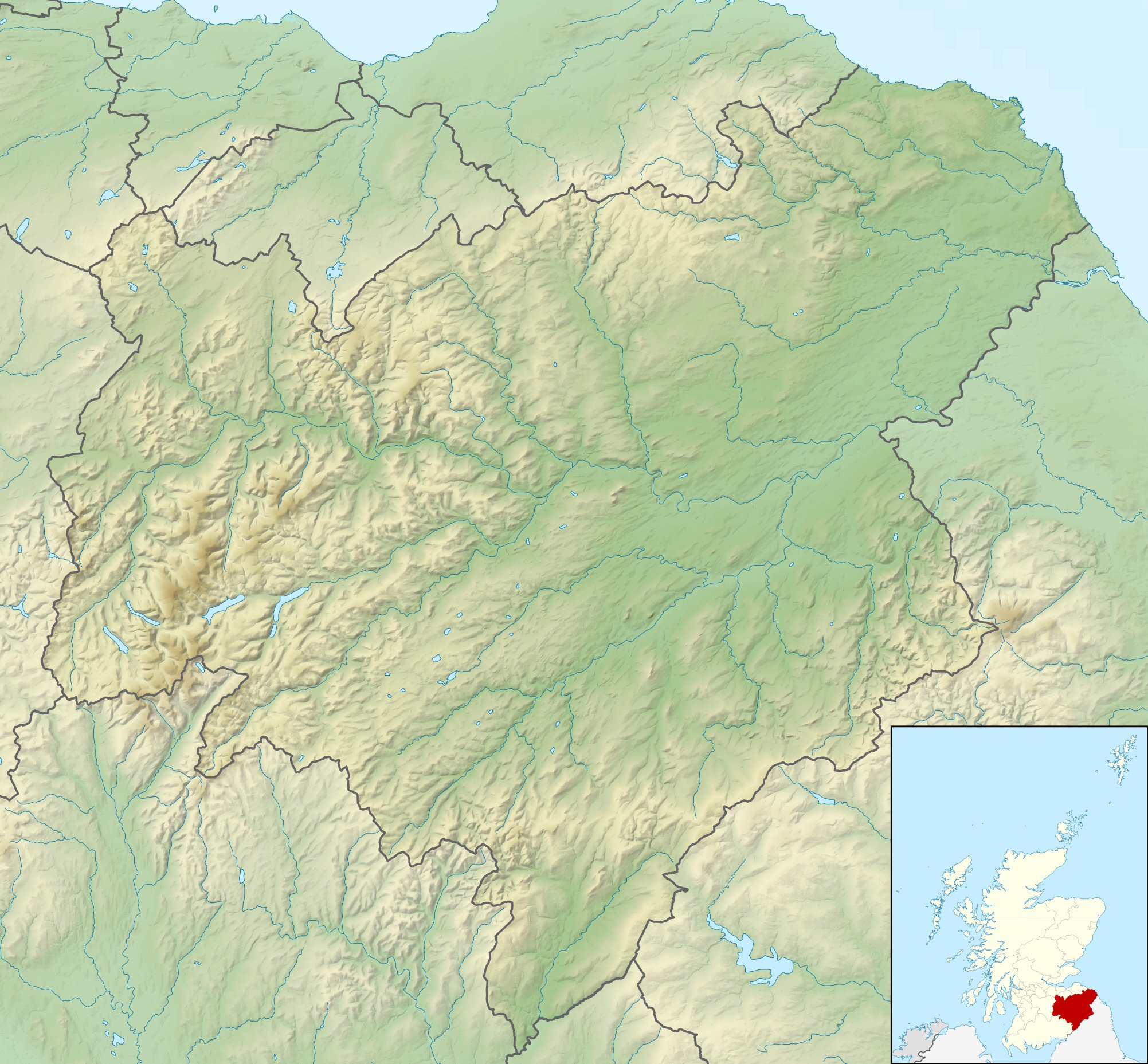
- Location within the City of Edinburgh council area Location within Midlothian Location within Scottish Borders Location within Scotland
- Country: United Kingdom
- Region: Scotland

The Pentland Hills are a range of hills southwest of Edinburgh, Scotland. The range is around 20 miles (30 kilometres) in length, covers an area of 35 square miles (91 km^{2}), and runs southwest from Edinburgh towards Biggar and the upper Clydesdale. The hills have been designated a Scottish regional park.

== Toponymy ==
The hills take their name from the hamlet of Pentland, which lies a short distance beyond the eastern end of the range. The hamlet's name, which was first recorded in the 12th century, probably comes from the Cumbric pen llan, meaning "head or top end of the church or enclosure". It was applied to the nearby hills from the 16th century onwards. The name of the Pentland Firth, the strait separating Orkney from Caithness, is unrelated.

== Geology ==
The southern and western parts of the Pentland Hills are formed from sandstones together with some conglomerates, all of Devonian age and assigned to the Old Red Sandstone. Within the sedimentary sequence are extrusive igneous rocks, principally of basaltic and andesitic composition. The sedimentary rocks are also intruded by dykes of porphyrite.

The oldest rocks are a sequence of Silurian mudstones, siltstones and sandstones collected together as the North Esk Group. From oldest to youngest they comprise the Llandovery age Reservoir Formation (named for North Esk Reservoir where these rocks are to be found), the Deerhope Formation, the Cock Rig Formation and the Wether Law Linn Formation overlain by the Wenlockian age Henshaw Formation. These are in turn unconformably overlain by the late Silurian to early Devonian age sandstones and conglomerates of the Greywacke Conglomerate and Swanshaw Sandstone formations. A further unconformity separates these from the overlying Pentland Hills Volcanic Formation though all three formations are collected together within the Lanark Group. The Volcanic Formation forms such summits as East and West Kip.

The southeastern edge of the range is defined by the Pentland Fault with a substantial downthrow to the southeast. Running NE-SW through the middle of the range is the Cairnmuir Fault which downthrows to the northwest. West Cairn Hill and East Cairn Hill are formed by the sandstones of the Kinnesswood Formation which reach as far north as Hare Hill (though also underlie much of the southeastern part of Edinburgh) and which terminate to the southeast at the Cairnmuir Fault. The Kinnesswood sandstones together with rocks of the Ballaggan Formation, which form the lower ground immediately northwest of the Pentlands, constitute the early Carboniferous age Inverclyde Group.

Black Hill stands out as being an intrusion of microgranite or felsite, as in part is nearby Harbour Hill. South Black Hill on the other hand, together with Scald Hill and Carnethy hill are formed from various lithologies of the Pentland Hills Volcanic Formation, as too are Allermuir, Caerketton and Castlelaw hills. The Volcanic Formation gives rise to generally steeper and craggier hillsides as these rocks are more resistant to erosion than the sedimentary rocks.

Much of the lower ground is covered by glacial till from the last ice age. Glacial meltwater channels are identified in places as at Deer Hope and the deep cleft of Green Cleugh between Hare Hill and Black Hill.

== List of peaks ==
The peaks include:

- Scald Law – 579 m (1,900 ft)
- Carnethy Hill – 573 m (1,880 ft)
- East Cairn Hill – 567 m (1,860 ft)
- South Black Hill – 563 m (1,847 ft)
- West Cairn Hill – 562 m (1,844 ft)
- West Kip – 551 m (1,808 ft)
- Byrehope Mount – 536 m (1,759 ft)
- Mount Maw – 536 m (1,759 ft)
- East Kip – 534 m (1,752 ft)
- Turnhouse Hill (1660 ft)
- Black Hill – 501 m (1,644 ft)
- Allermuir Hill – 493 m (1,617 ft)
- Castlelaw Hill – 488 m (1,601 ft)
- Caerketton Hill – 478 m (1,568 ft)

The hills span a number of council regions: from the City of Edinburgh council area and Midlothian in the north, south-west through West Lothian to the Scottish Borders and South Lanarkshire.

== Use ==
The hills cover an area of 35 square miles (91 km^{2}), and were designated as a regional park in 1986. The hills are used for a variety of recreational activities including hillwalking, mountain biking, horse riding, golf, and an artificial ski slope at the Midlothian Snowsports Centre.

Today most of the land is upland pasture, along with a few forestry plantations. The Ministry of Defence has a rifle range at Castlelaw. A number of rivers rise in the hills, including the Water of Leith and the North Esk, and there are several reservoirs, including Threipmuir, Harlaw, Glencorse and Loganlea.

In the southern part of the hills is Little Sparta, the garden of the late artist and poet Ian Hamilton Finlay.

Settlements in or near the Pentlands include:

- Edinburgh suburbs – Balerno (with Malleny Mills), Juniper Green, Colinton, Currie, Oxgangs, Fairmilehead, Swanston
- Midlothian – Glencorse, Hillend, Nine Mile Burn, Eight Mile Burn, Penicuik, Silverburn
- West Lothian – Kirknewton (Livingston is also nearby)
- Scottish Borders (traditional Peeblesshire) – Carlops, West Linton
- South Lanarkshire – Biggar, Auchengray, Carnwath, Dolphinton, Dunsyre, Garvald, Tarbrax

== History ==
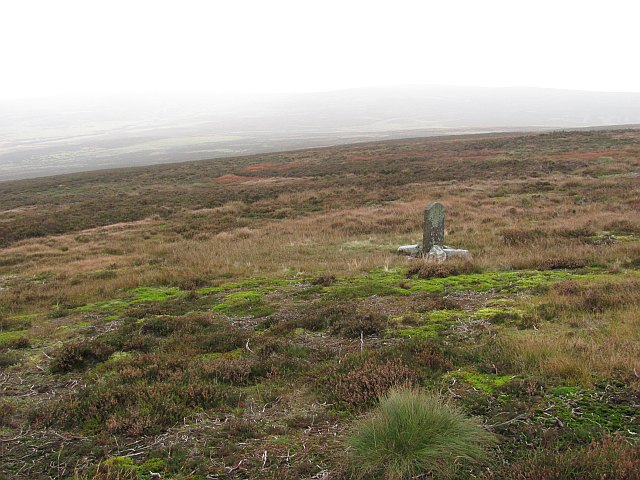
The Covananter's Grave

There is evidence of prehistoric settlement in the area, e.g. the hillfort and souterrain at Castle Law, and another at Caerketton. The hills were most likely settled, farmed and defended in the pre-Roman and Roman era by the local Celtic people known to the Romans as the Votadini.

About 20 m (66 ft) into Glencorse Reservoir lie the submerged ruins of the chapel of St Katherine's in the Hope. The founding of the chapel is connected with the story of a mediaeval royal deer hunt. According to the story, King Robert the Bruce staked the Pentland Estate against the life of Sir William St Clair, with the outcome of the hunt of a white deer by the knight and his two hounds, 'Help' and 'Hold', being the deciding factor. The dogs managed to bring down the deer, and in gratitude, and to mark the spot, Sir William had a chapel built in the glen.

The hills were the scene of an incident in 1666 following the Restoration of King Charles II when an outbreak of armed rebellion amongst Covenanters led to a small force of badly armed conventiclers being defeated at the battle of Rullion Green. Afterwards the whole episode was (incorrectly) named the Pentland Rising. The incident is commemorated by the "Covananter's Grave", a cairn after which one of the drove roads across the hills is known (OS Grid Reference NT078521).

In January 1985, the hills were the scene of a triple murder. Andrew Walker, a corporal at Glencorse Barracks, robbed three colleagues of £19,000 in cash which they had just collected from a bank in Penicuik for the barracks' payroll. He forced them to drive along a track to the Loganlea Reservoir. He shot and killed all three and dumped their bodies at the bottom of some steps next to a derelict cottage. Walker was subsequently arrested, convicted of the robbery and murders and sentenced to life imprisonment. He was released in 2011 and died in 2021. The payroll money was never recovered.

== Gallery ==
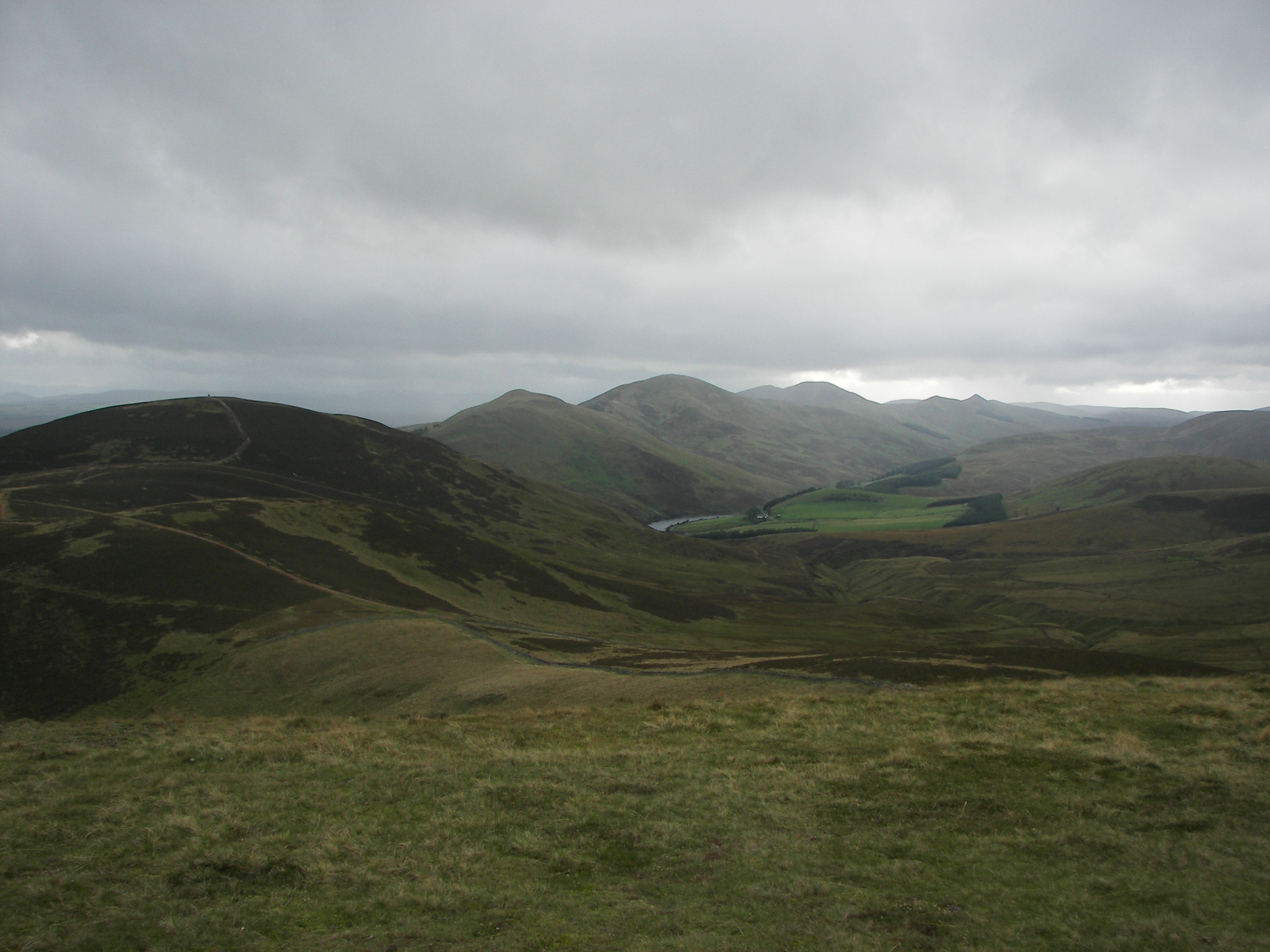
The Pentland Hills seen from Allermuir Hill

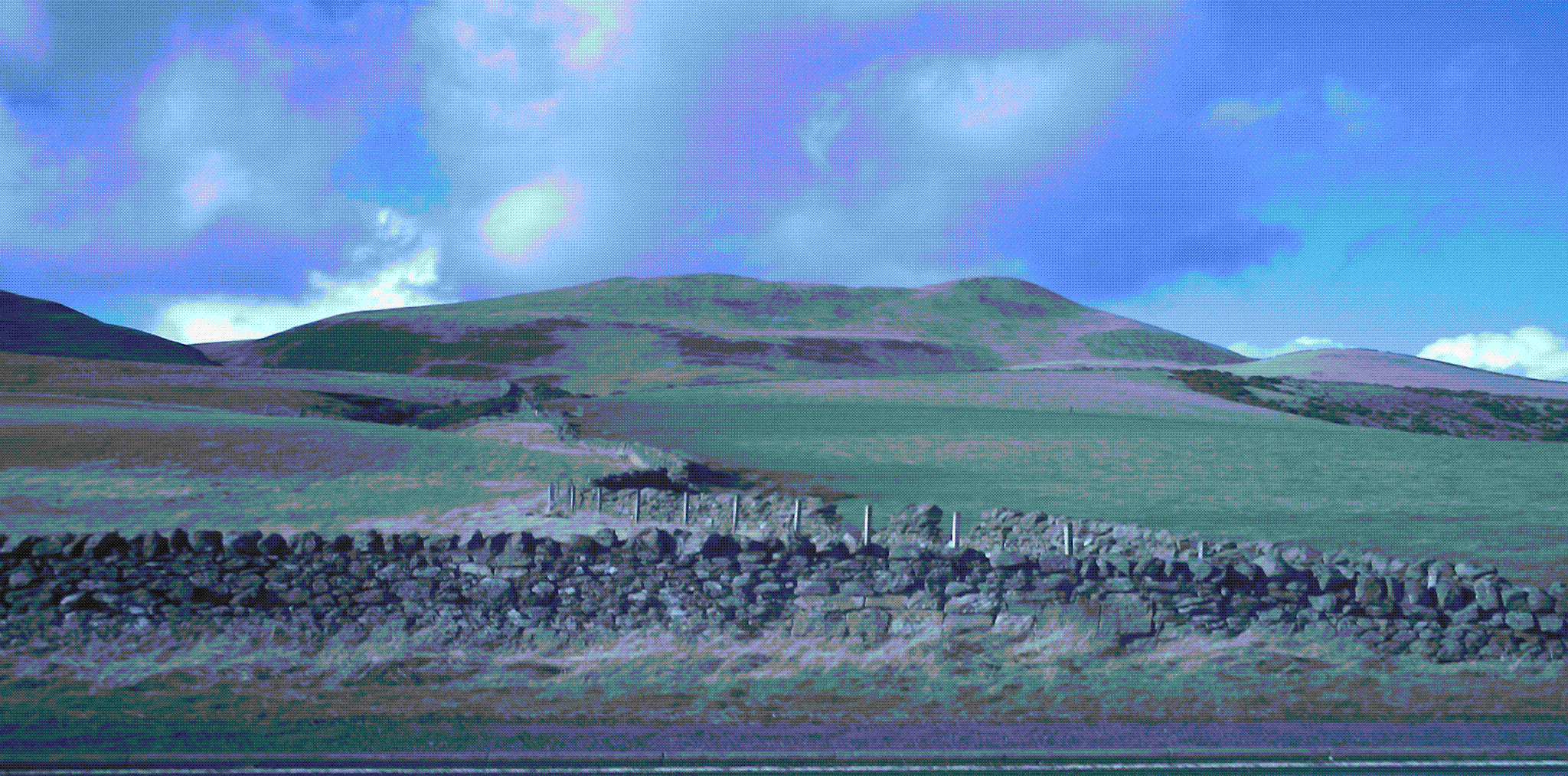
Pentland Hills looking west from the A702

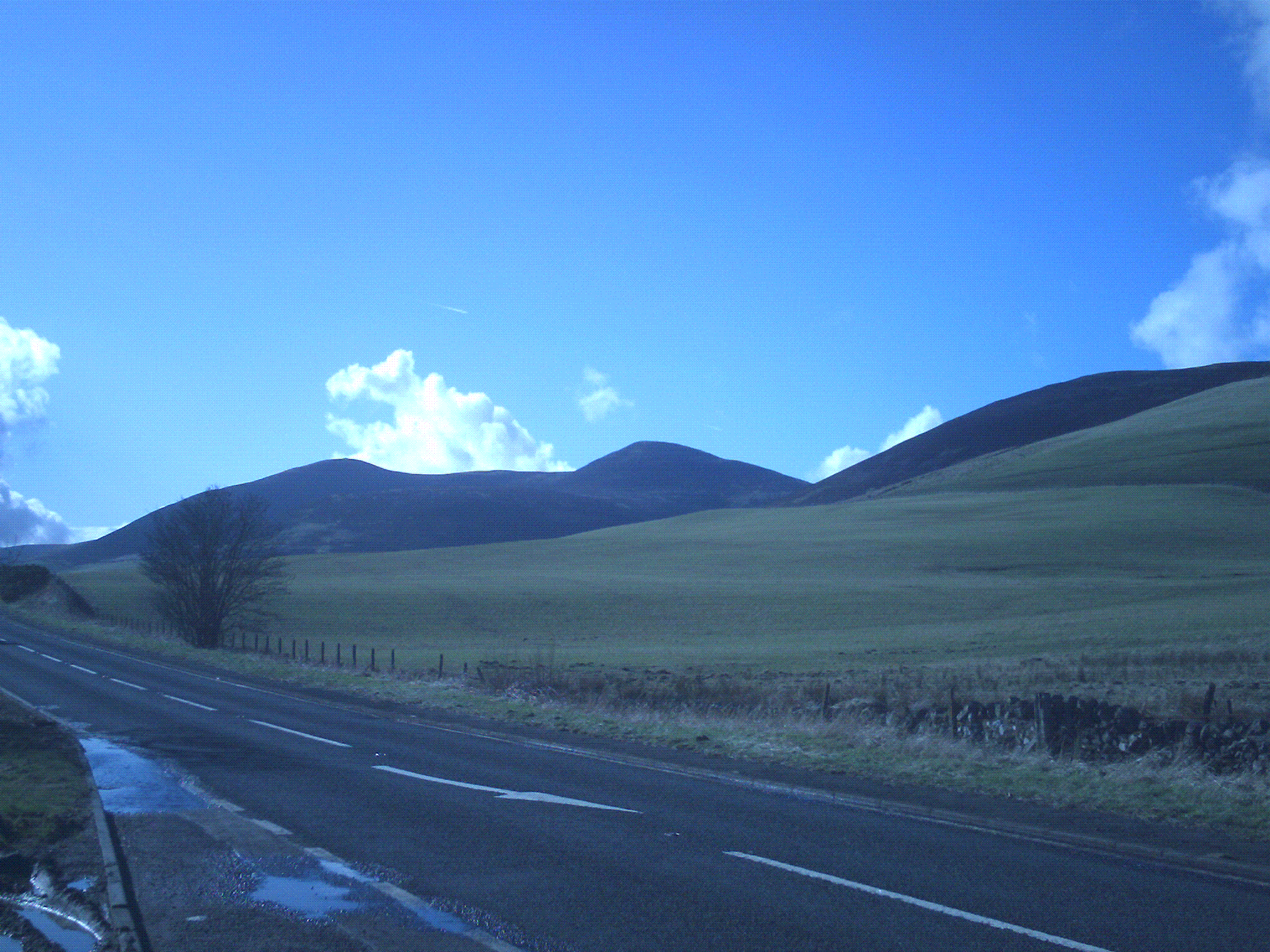
Pentland Hills looking south west from the A702

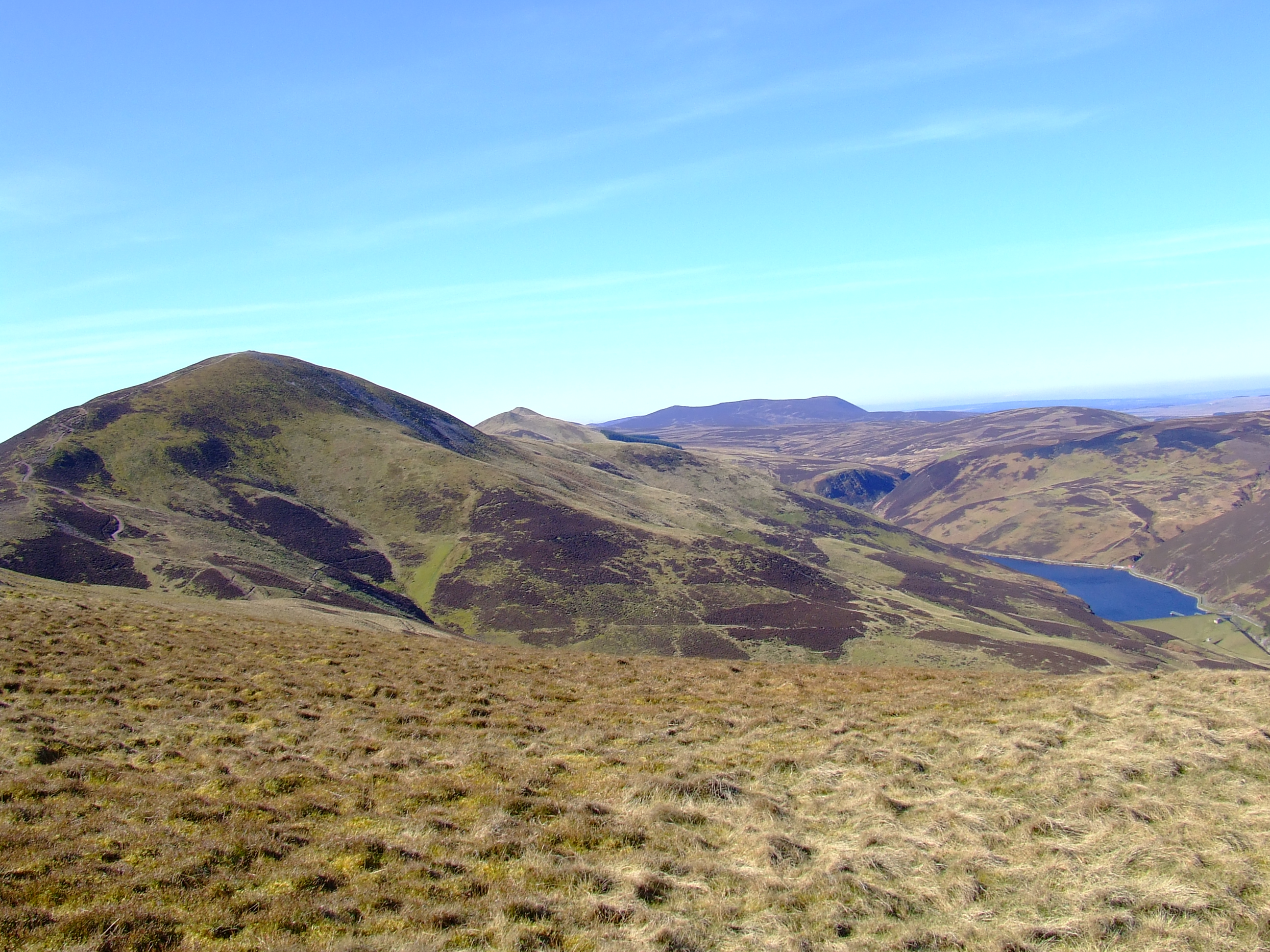
Southern part of the range seen from Turnhouse Hill

== See also ==
- List of places in the Scottish Borders
- List of places in South Lanarkshire
- List of places in Edinburgh
- List of places in Midlothian
- List of places in West Lothian
