= Carlops =

Coordinates: 55.79°N 3.34°W

Carlops: Scottish Gaelic: Leum na Caillich
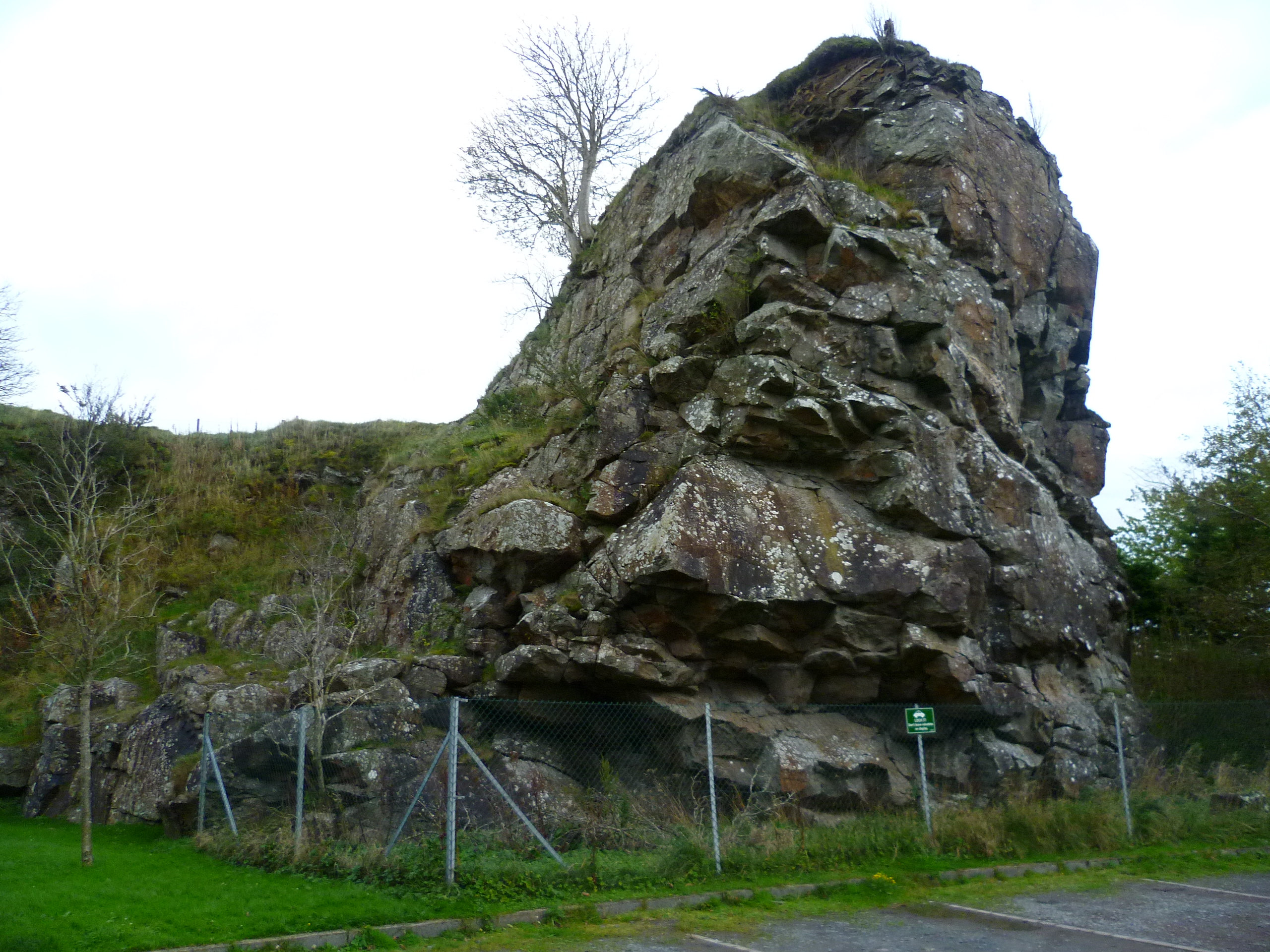
- The Carlins Lowp

- Location within the Scottish Borders
- OS grid reference: NT162561
- Council area: Scottish Borders
- Lieutenancy area: Tweeddale
- Country: Scotland
- Sovereign state: United Kingdom
- Post town: PENICUIK
- Postcode district: EH26
- Dialling code: 01968
- Police: Scotland
- Fire: Scottish
- Ambulance: Scottish
- UK Parliament: Dumfriesshire, Clydesdale and Tweeddale
- Scottish Parliament: Midlothian South, Tweeddale and Lauderdale.

Carlops (Scottish Gaelic: Leum na Caillich) is a small village in the Pentland Hills, within the Scottish Borders area of Scotland, close to the boundary with Midlothian. It lies between West Linton and Penicuik.

The village was founded in 1784 and developed cotton weaving, coalmining and limestone mining.

The name derives from the Scots "Carlins Lowp" (English: "Witches' Leap"), since near the south of the village there are two exposed rock faces about 20 m (66 ft) high facing each other, with a similar distance between them. Folklore maintained that witches would leap from one face to the other, over the chasm, for entertainment of an evening.

== The Village ==
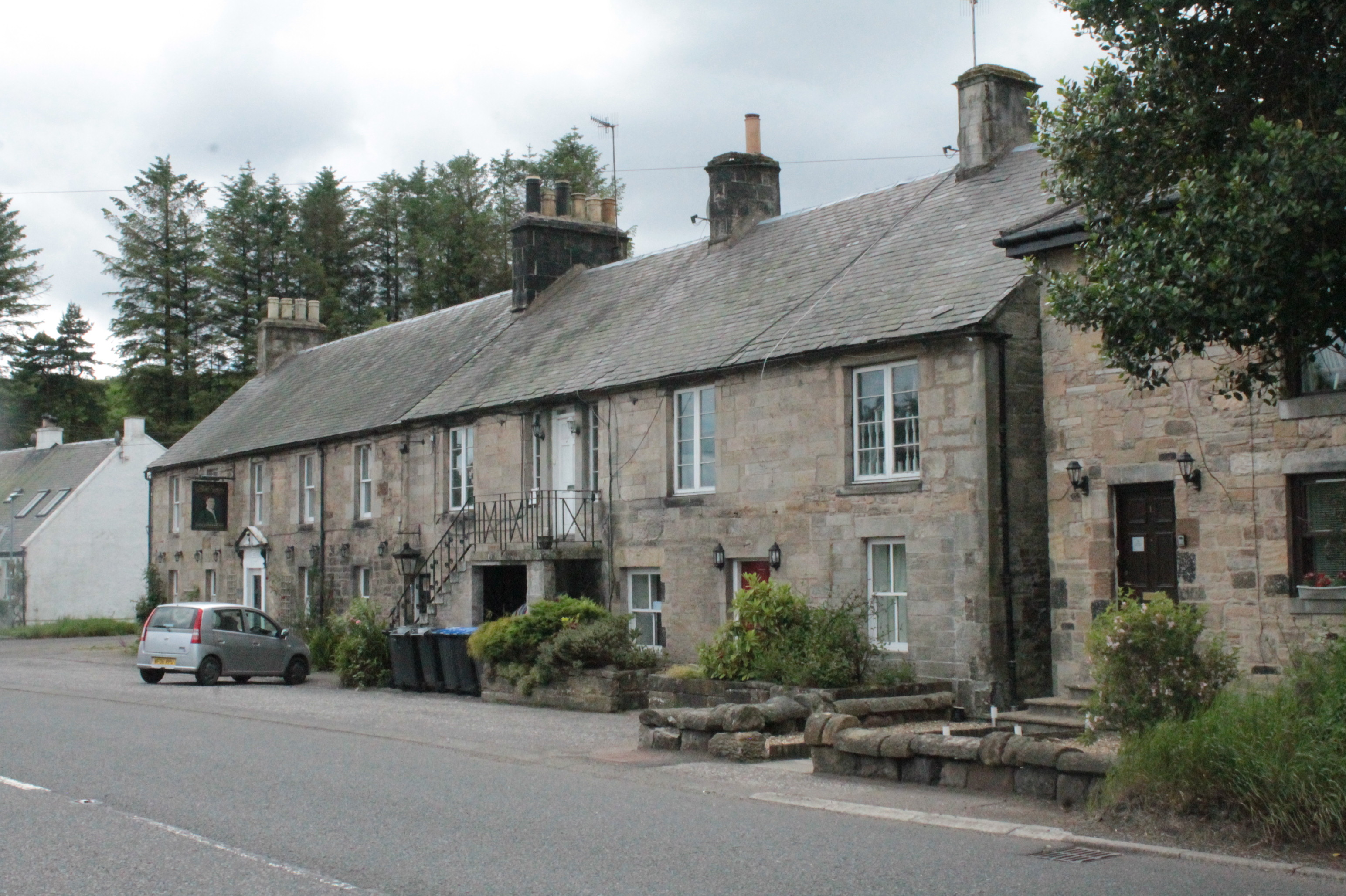
Allan Ramsay Hotel, Carlops

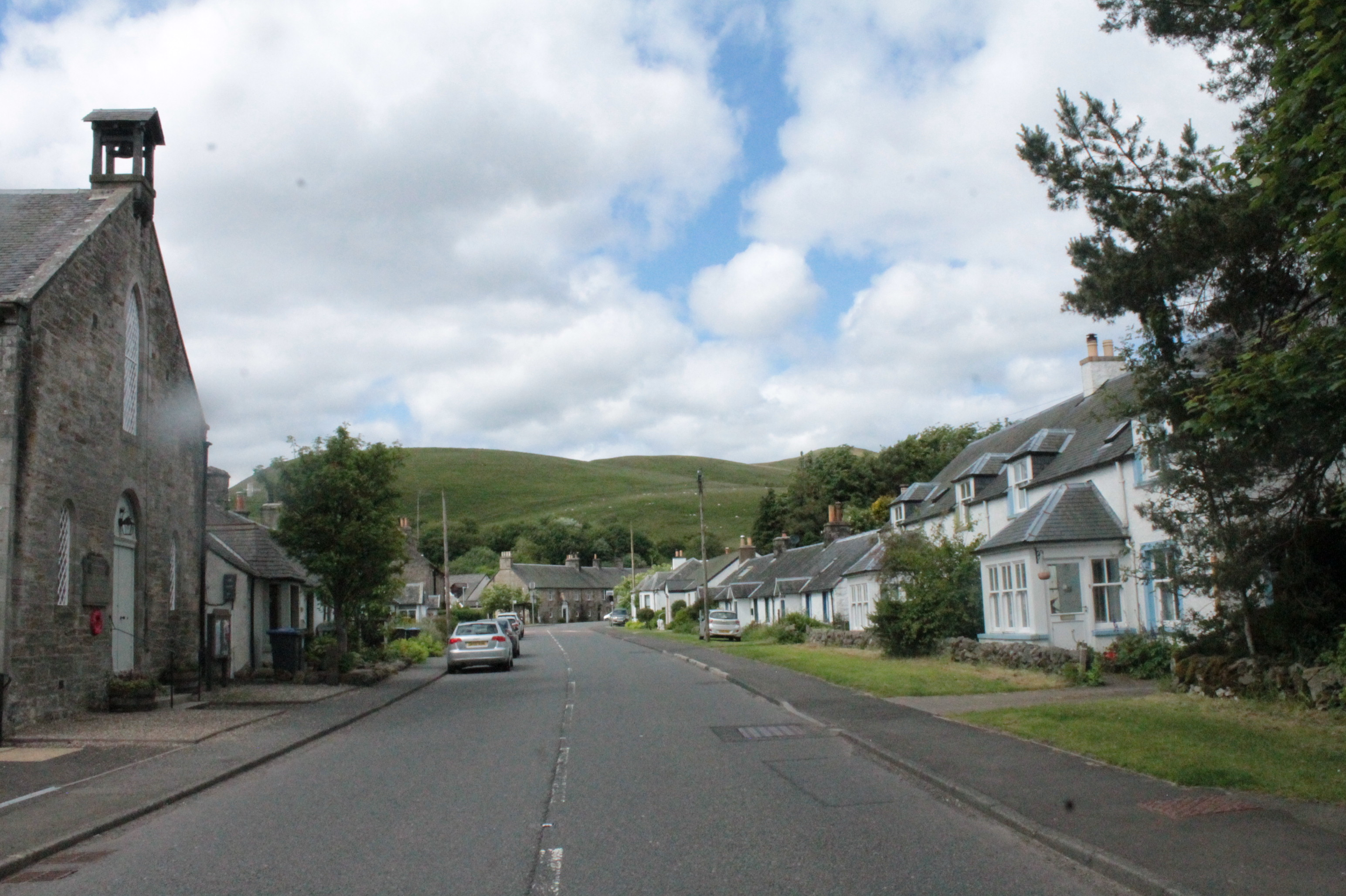
Main road, Carlops

The current village was planned and laid out in 1784 by Robert Brown, advocate and laird of Newhall, as two rows of single-storey cottages facing each other across the A702 road. These housed weavers linked to mills just to the north. In 1800, Alexander Alexander of West Linton set up a watermill to create felts for use in the nearby paper mills in Penicuik.

The Allan Ramsay Hotel was built as a wool warehouse in 1792 and converted to an inn in the mid-19th century, honing in on the local connections to Allan Ramsay. It was run by the granddaughter of Alexander Alexander, Mrs Veitch, known as Mother Veitch.

== Notable residents ==
- C. T. R. Wilson (1869–1959), winner of the Nobel Prize for Physics in 1927, retired to Carlops and died there in 1959.
- Dr Archibald "Archie" Lamont FRSE FGS (21 October 1907 – 16 March 1985), Scottish geologist, palaeontologist, Scottish Nationalist, writer, poet and politician, retired to Carlops and lived in Jess Cottage.

== See also ==
- List of places in the Scottish Borders
- List of places in Scotland
