= List of Category A listed buildings in Midlothian =

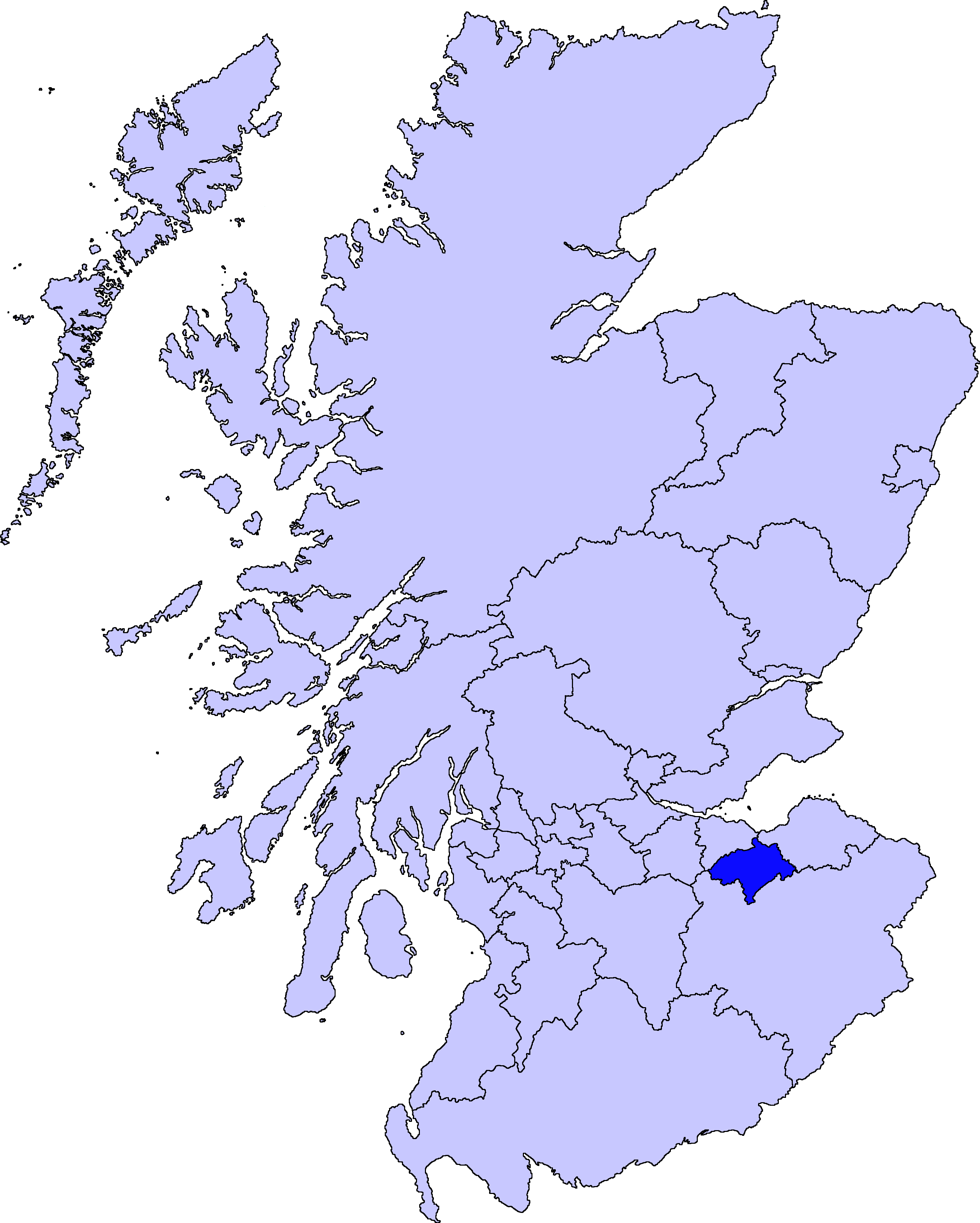
Midlothian shown within Scotland

This is a list of Category A listed buildings in Midlothian, Scotland.

In Scotland, the term listed building refers to a building or other structure officially designated as being of "special architectural or historic interest". Category A structures are those considered to be "buildings of national or international importance, either architectural or historic, or fine little-altered examples of some particular period, style or building type." Listing was begun by a provision in the Town and Country Planning (Scotland) Act 1947, and the current legislative basis for listing is the Planning (Listed Buildings and Conservation Areas) (Scotland) Act 1997. The authority for listing rests with Historic Scotland, an executive agency of the Scottish Government, which inherited this role from the Scottish Development Department in 1991. Once listed, severe restrictions are imposed on the modifications allowed to a building's structure or its fittings. Listed building consent must be obtained from local authorities prior to any alteration to such a structure. There are approximately 47,400 listed buildings in Scotland, of which around 8% (some 3,800) are Category A.

The council area of Midlothian covers 354 square kilometres (137 sq mi), and has a population of around 80,600. There are 71 Category A listed buildings in the area.

== Listed buildings ==
Name	Location	Date listed	Geo-coordinates	Notes	LB number	Image
Preston Hall Stables	Preston Hall Policies, Pathhead		55°52′58″N 2°58′00″W	Late-18th-century stable block including kennels, piggery, pheasantry and cottages	113	Upload Photo
Whitehill House	Rosewell		55°50′46″N 3°07′31″W	19th-century country house by William Burn, later St Joseph's Institution	687	Upload Photo
Preston Hall, North Gate	Preston Hall Policies, Pathhead		55°53′38″N 2°57′24″W	18th-century estate gateway	745	Upload Photo
Preston Hall, The Lion's Gate	Preston Hall Policies, Pathhead		55°52′34″N 2°58′21″W	Late-18th-century gates and lodges	746	Upload another image See more images
Crichton Parish Church	Crichton		55°50′37″N 2°59′25″W	15th-century former collegiate church of S.S. Mary and Kentigern, including graveyard	753	Upload another image See more images
Ford House	Ford, Pathhead		55°52′07″N 2°58′39″W	17th-century laird's house	756	Upload another image See more images
Crichton House	Crichton		55°51′06″N 2°57′34″W	17th-century laird's house	757	Upload another image
Oxenfoord Castle	Pathhead		55°52′44″N 2°58′46″W	18th-century country house by Robert Adam	768	Upload another image See more images
Oxenfoord Viaduct	Pathhead		55°52′46″N 2°58′46″W	18th-century bridge accessing Oxenfoord Castle	769	Upload another image See more images
Preston Hall	Pathhead		55°52′52″N 2°58′11″W	Late-18th-century country house by Robert Mitchell	775	Upload another image See more images
Preston Hall, Walled Garden	Preston Hall Policies, Pathhead		55°52′58″N 2°58′22″W	Walled garden including sheds, gazebos, glass houses, sundial and gardener's house	777	Upload Photo
Preston Hall, The Temple	Preston Hall Policies, Pathhead		55°53′14″N 2°58′07″W	Classical temple folly	779	Upload another image
Cockpen and Carrington Parish Church	Bonnyrigg		55°51′58″N 3°05′21″W	19th-century church by Archibald Elliot	780	Upload another image See more images
Dalhousie Castle	Bonnyrigg		55°51′39″N 3°04′57″W	15th-century castle, extended in the 19th century by William Burn	784	Upload another image See more images
Vogrie House	Newlandrig, Pathhead		55°51′30″N 2°59′26″W	19th-century country house	799	Upload another image See more images
Borthwick Castle	Borthwick		55°49′36″N 3°00′26″W	15th-century tower house	805	Upload another image See more images
Middleton Hall	North Middleton		55°48′48″N 3°00′36″W	Early-18th-century country house	806	Upload Photo
Arniston House	Temple		55°49′25″N 3°04′39″W		808	Upload another image See more images
Arniston House, Grotto	Temple		55°49′16″N 3°04′50″W	18th-century country house by William Adam	811	Upload Photo
Arniston House, North Gate-Lodge and Elephant Gates	Temple		55°50′22″N 3°03′39″W	18th-century gates and lodges	814	Upload Photo
Dalkeith House, Conservatory	Dalkeith		55°54′08″N 3°03′36″W	19th-century conservatory by William Burn	1410	Upload another image See more images
Dalkeith House	Dalkeith		55°53′59″N 3°04′04″W	Early-18th-century country house by James Smith	1411	Upload another image See more images
Dalkeith House, Dark Walk Gateway	Dalkeith		55°53′51″N 3°03′34″W	18th-century gateway	1412	Upload another image See more images
Dalkeith House, King's Gate	Dalkeith		55°53′51″N 3°05′09″W	19th-century gateway and lodge by David Bryce and William Burn	1437	Upload another image
Dalkeith House, Montagu Bridge	Dalkeith		55°54′06″N 3°04′02″W	18th-century bridge by Robert Adam	1440	Upload another image See more images
St Mary's Episcopal Church, Dalkeith	Musselburgh Road, Dalkeith		55°53′53″N 3°03′55″W	19th-century Gothic church by David Bryce and William Burn	1441	Upload another image See more images
Dalkeith House, Stables and Coach House	Dalkeith		55°54′06″N 3°03′38″W	18th-century stable block by William Adam	1442	Upload Photo
Glenesk Railway Viaduct	Eskbank		55°53′33″N 3°04′58″W	19th-century bridge carrying the Edinburgh and Dalkeith Railway over the River North Esk	1445	Upload Photo
Lothian Bridge	Pathhead		55°52′12″N 2°58′29″W	19th-century bridge by Thomas Telford, carrying the A68 road over the Tyne Water	5090	Upload another image See more images
Mavisbank House, Dovecot	Loanhead		55°52′47″N 3°07′49″W	18th-century circular doocot	7386	Upload another image
Mavisbank House, Gazebo	Loanhead		55°52′20″N 3°08′18″W	18th-century garden building	7387	Upload Photo
Melville Castle	Lasswade		55°53′28″N 3°06′16″W	18th-century Gothic house by James Playfair	7394	Upload another image See more images
Barony House	Wadingburn Road, Lasswade		55°52′52″N 3°07′31″W	Late-18th-century cottage, remodelled by John Clerk of Eldin	7398	Upload Photo
Mavisbank House	Loanhead		55°52′27″N 3°08′22″W	18th-century country house by William Adam and Sir John Clerk of Penicuik	7404	Upload another image See more images
Glencorse Old Parish Church	Glencorse, Penicuik		55°51′17″N 3°12′26″W	17th-century church, now roofless	7454	Upload another image See more images
Glencorse Parish Church	Glencorse, Penicuik		55°51′03″N 3°12′17″W	19th-century church by Robert Rowand Anderson	7456	Upload another image See more images
Bush House	Bush, Penicuik		55°51′33″N 3°12′23″W	18th-century house by the Adam Brothers	7462	Upload another image See more images
Melville Castle, Willie's Temple	Lasswade		55°53′23″N 3°06′44″W	18th-century folly	12940	Upload Photo
Hawthornden Castle	Rosewell, Midlothian		55°51′39″N 3°08′31″W	Castle, largely of the 17th century, partly restored	13023	Upload another image See more images
Roslin Castle	Roslin		55°51′09″N 3°09′36″W	Ruined 15th-century defences, with 17th-century house	13026	Upload another image See more images
Rosslyn Chapel	Roslin		55°51′19″N 3°09′36″W	15th-century collegiate chapel	13028	Upload another image See more images
Auchendinny House	Auchendinny		55°50′22″N 3°11′47″W	Early-18th-century house by Sir William Bruce	13034	Upload Photo
Bilston Viaduct	Loanhead		55°52′17″N 3°09′04″W	19th-century viaduct for the Edinburgh, Loanhead and Roslin Railway, over the Bilston Burn	13035	Upload another image See more images
Woolmet House, Gateway	Danderhall		55°55′02″N 3°06′36″W	17th-century gateway of demolished Woolmet House, now part of Danderhall Miners' Club	14184	Upload another image
Newbattle Abbey	Newbattle		55°52′58″N 3°04′01″W	16th-century house, later extended, on site of a 12th-century Cistercian monastery	14561	Upload another image See more images
Newbattle Abbey, North Sundial	Newbattle		55°53′00″N 3°03′58″W	17th-century sundial, one of a pair with the South Sundial	14562	Upload another image
Newbattle Abbey, South Sundial	Newbattle		55°52′58″N 3°03′56″W	17th-century sundial, one of a pair with the North Sundial	14563	Upload another image
Newbattle Abbey, Maiden Bridge	Newbattle		55°53′16″N 3°03′43″W	15th-century bridge over the River South Esk	14564	Upload another image See more images
Newbattle Abbey, Monkland Wall	Newbattle		55°52′52″N 3°04′15″W	Medieval boundary wall	14566	Upload another image
Newbattle Abbey, Port Gate-Lodges and Gates	Newbattle		55°52′53″N 3°04′15″W	Early-18th-century gateway and lodges	14567	Upload another image
Newbattle Old Bridge	Newbattle Road, Newbattle		55°52′48″N 3°04′13″W	16th-century road bridge	14568	Upload another image
Lady Victoria Colliery	Newtongrange		55°51′42″N 3°04′04″W	Late 19th to mid-20th century, now the Scottish Mining Museum	14604	Upload another image See more images
Arniston House, Walled Garden	Gorebridge		55°49′14″N 3°04′42″W	18th-century walled garden	14625	Upload Photo
Rosebery Home Farm	Temple		55°48′19″N 3°06′51″W	Early-19th-century Gothic farm	14630	Upload another image See more images
Penicuik House	Penicuik		55°49′11″N 3°15′03″W	Shell of 18th-century country house by Sir James Clerk, 3rd Baronet, burned out in 1899, currently under major restoration	14634	Upload another image See more images
New Penicuik House	Penicuik		55°49′16″N 3°15′05″W	Former stable block, converted after the main house burned out in 1899	14635	Upload another image See more images
Fairfield House hot house	Croft Street, Dalkeith		55°53′31″N 3°04′10″W	Early- to mid-19th-century glasshouse	24339	Upload Photo
St David's RC Church	Eskbank Road, Dalkeith		55°53′27″N 3°04′32″W	Mid-19th-century gothic church	24355	Upload another image See more images
Eskbank House	14 Glenesk Crescent, Dalkeith		55°53′25″N 3°04′47″W	18th-century villa	24375	Upload Photo
Dalkeith Old Kirk	High Street, Dalkeith		55°53′44″N 3°04′08″W	15th century, remodelled by David Bryce, includes watch house in graveyard	24377	Upload another image See more images
Dalkeith Tolbooth	176-180 High Street, Dalkeith		55°53′43″N 3°04′04″W	18th-century town hall	24417	Upload another image See more images
Dalkeith Corn Exchange	200 High Street And 61 St Andrew Street, Dalkeith		55°53′46″N 3°04′00″W	Mid-19th-century hall by David Cousin	24422	Upload another image See more images
Linsandel House	12 Melville Road, Dalkeith		55°53′22″N 3°04′53″W	19th-century Italianate villa	24443	Upload Photo
Dalkeith Lodge (Newbattle Abbey West Lodge)	Newmills Road, Dalkeith		55°53′31″N 3°04′00″W	Mid-19th-century Gothic gateway and lodge	24452	Upload Photo
22-34 Bridge Street and 1-7 Park End	Penicuik		55°49′29″N 3°13′18″W	19th-century Gothic shops and tenements by F T Pilkington	39294	Upload another image
Penicuik South Church	Peebles Road, Penicuik		55°49′22″N 3°13′17″W	19th-century Gothic church by F T Pilkington	39295	Upload another image See more images
Mavisbank House, Walled Garden	Loanhead		55°52′25″N 3°08′14″W	18th-century walled garden	44166	Upload Photo
Glencorse Barracks Clock Tower	Glencorse, Penicuik		55°50′43″N 3°12′12″W	Early-19th-century clock tower and prison	44614	Upload Photo

== See also ==
- Scheduled monuments in Midlothian
