= Scheduled monuments in Midlothian =

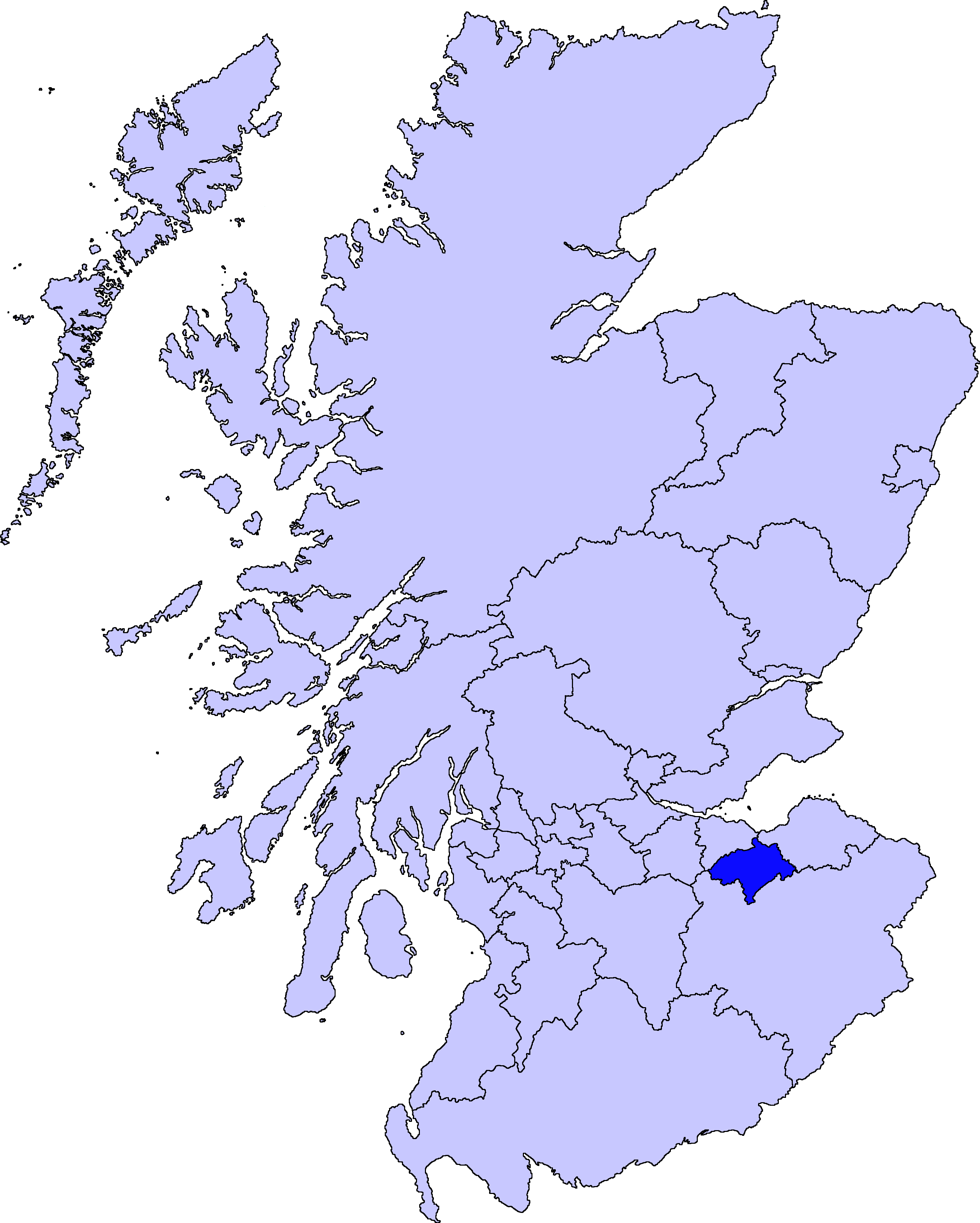
Midlothian shown within Scotland

A scheduled monument in Scotland is a nationally important archaeological site or monument which is given legal protection by being placed on a list (or "schedule") maintained by Historic Environment Scotland. The aim of scheduling is to preserve the country's most significant sites and monuments as far as possible in the form in which they have been inherited.

The process of scheduling is governed by the Ancient Monuments and Archaeological Areas Act 1979, which aims "to make provision for the investigation, preservation and recording of matters of archaeological or historical interest". The term "scheduled monument" can apply to the whole range of archaeological sites which have been deliberately constructed by human activity but are not always visible above ground. They range from prehistoric standing stones and burial sites, through Roman remains and medieval structures such as castles and monasteries, to later structures such as industrial sites and buildings constructed for the World Wars. Some buildings or structures which were both scheduled and listed have had their listing designations removed to reduce the duplication.

In 2017 there were 8238 scheduled monuments in Scotland.

== Notable Scheduled Monuments in Midlothian ==
Name	Location	Description	Ref No	Image
Choir of St Nicholas Church	Dalkeith	Ruined choir of St Nicholas parish church	SM1188	
Brunstane Castle	Penicuik	Ruined 16th-century L-plan tower-house	SM1192	
Rosslyn Castle	Lasswade	Remains of great 15th-century castle	SM1208	
St Kentigern's Church and the Clerk Mausoleum	Penicuik	Ruined 17th-century church and mausoleum	SM2145	
Newbyres Castle	Borthwick	Ruined 16th-century tower house	SM5652	
Rosslyn Chapel nave and St Matthew's church	Roslin	Burial ground and buried remains of chapel nave and of St Matthew's church	SM6458	
Crichton Castle	Crichton	Ruined 14th-century tower house	SM13585	
Castle Law hillfort	Glencorse	Iron Age hillfort and souterrain	SM90064	

== See also ==
- List of Category A listed buildings in Midlothian
