= Dalkeith Tolbooth =

Municipal building in Dalkeith, Scotland

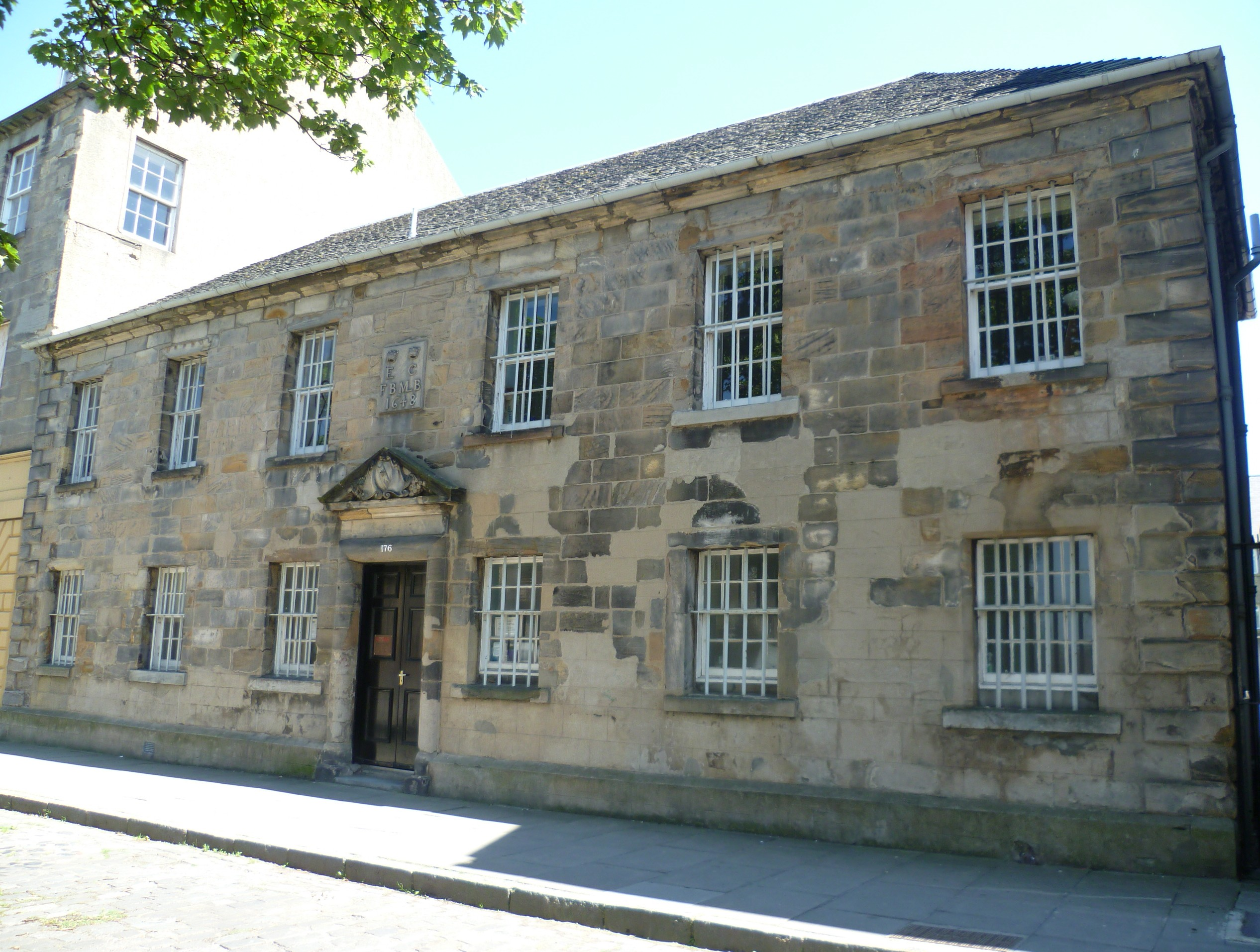
- The building in 2011

- Shown in Midlothian
- 55.8954°N 3.0678°W
- Location: High Street, Dalkeith

History
- Built: 1648

Site notes
- Architectural style: Neoclassical style

Listed Building – Category A
- Official name: 176–180 (Even Nos) High Street, Dalkeith Tolbooth
- Designated: 22 January 1971
- Reference no.: LB24417

Dalkeith Tolbooth is a historic building on the High Street in Dalkeith, Scotland. The building, which was previously the meeting place of the burgh council, is a Category A listed building.

== History ==
A tolbooth has existed on the east side of the High Street at least as far back as the 16th century. The current structure was commissioned by Francis Scott, 2nd Earl of Buccleuch. It was designed in the neoclassical style, built in ashlar stone and completed in around 1648. Scott died just three years later in 1651.

The design involved a symmetrical main frontage of seven bays facing onto the High Street. The central bay featured a doorway with a moulded surround surmounted by an entablature and a pediment with a cartouche, bearing the arms of the Earls of Buccleuch, in the tympanum. A stone inscribed "EFB CMLB 1648" was installed above the doorway at first floor level. The initials referred to Scott (Earl Francis of Buccleuch) and his wife (Countess Margaret Leslie of Buccleugh). Historians believe that the current stone is not original: it was probably recovered from another building, with the inscription being carved and the stone installed at least a century later. The building was fenestrated by sash windows on both floors. There were quoins at the corners and there was a cornice at roof level. Internally, the principal room was the courtroom on the first floor: there were also prison cells in the basement, a weigh house on the ground floor and a courtroom on the first floor.

In 1661, around 30 women were tried for witchcraft in the courtroom at Dalkeith Tolbooth. Issobell Fergussone and Beatrix Leslie were among at least six women who were found guilty and subsequently strangled and burnt. In the mid-18th century, when the building was remodelled again, it was described as having been the "property of the family of BuccIeuch...past all memory" confirming its mid-17th century origins.

One of the last people to face a public execution in Scotland, William Thomson, was tried at the High Court of Justiciary in Edinburgh for the murder of a farmer from Cousland, George Dickson, found guilty and then hanged from the gallows outside the tolbooth in Dalkeith in March 1827. The prison cells in the building continued to be used until 1841.

Following significant population growth, largely associated with the status of Dalkeith as a market town, the area became a police burgh in 1878. In this context, the new burgh commissioners decided to procure a purpose-built municipal structure: the burgh council duly relocated to the new Municipal Buildings in Buccleuch Street in 1882. After the council left the tolbooth, it continued to be used as a meeting place by the Dalkeith Scientific Association until 1929. It was then converted for use as a Baptist church and remained in that use until it was refurbished to a design by Armstrong and Thomas of Kirkcaldy and given to St. Mary's Episcopal Church for use as their church hall in January 1966.

Since the early 21st century it has served as a base for staff employed by the Midlothian's Young People Advice Service (MYPAS). An extensive programme of repairs to the external fabric of the building, involving the replacement of cement, was carried out at a cost of £220,000 in 2012. Following completion of the works, the building was re-opened by Richard Scott, 10th Duke of Buccleuch in February 2013.

== See also ==
- List of Category A listed buildings in Midlothian
- List of listed buildings in Dalkeith, Midlothian
