= Arniston House =

Historic house in Midlothian, Scotland

Coordinates: 55°49′25.27″N 3°4′39.03″W

Designations

Inventory of Gardens and Designed Landscapes in Scotland
- Official name: Arniston
- Designated: 30 June 1987
- Reference no.: GDL00029

Arniston House

Arniston House is a historic house in Midlothian, Scotland, near the village of Temple. This Georgian mansion was designed by William Adam in 1726 for Robert Dundas, of Arniston, the elder, the Lord President of the Court of Session. The western third of the house was added by John Adam, son of William and brother of Robert Adam, in 1753.

== History ==
The Arniston Estate lands were a royal hunting park in the Middle Ages, and were later owned by the Knights Templar, who gave the nearby village of Temple its name. The estate came into the Dundas family in 1571, when it was bought by George Dundas of Dundas Castle. He left the estate to a younger son, James, who built a house and a walled garden here around 1620. The estate was expanded, and improvements were made by James' grandson Robert Dundas (died 1726) in the late 17th century. His son Robert, later the Lord President, continued the improvements, and built the present house.

Robert Dundas (1685–1753) was a lawyer and politician. He served as Solicitor General for Scotland from 1717 to 1720 and as Lord Advocate from 1720 to 1725. He was also a Member of Parliament from 1722 to 1737. In 1726, he commissioned the architect William Adam to design a new house at Arniston. Adam was then working on Sir John Clerk's nearby house at Mavisbank, but Arniston was to be a somewhat larger house. It was built over the foundations of the original 17th-century house, but Dundas ran out of money during the building works, which were only completed after 1753. By this time, William Adam was dead, and the design for the western part of the house was provided by his eldest son John Adam (1721–1792), for Robert Dundas' son Robert Dundas, of Arniston, the younger (1713–1787).

In 1872, a new entrance hall was added to the north front by the architects Wardrop and Brown. The house is still occupied by members of the Dundas family who, in the summer months, open the house to the public and lead guided tours.

== Architecture ==
The house is of three storeys over a basement. The entrance front of the house faces north, and comprises nine bays. The central bays have a colossal order of Ionic columns, topped by a pediment, while the outer two bays at each end stand slightly forward. Pavilions, connected by diagonal corridors, flank a forecourt to the north, into which the 19th-century entrance hall projects. The south, garden front, is plainer, having a pediment but no columns. The Royal coat of arms of Scotland in the pediment may have come from Parliament House in Edinburgh, which was refaced at the beginning of the 19th century, around the same time that the porch and stair were added. Overall, the design of the house shows the influence of James Gibbs, and particularly his Down Hall, Essex.

The most significant interiors are William Adam's two-storey, galleried saloon, with decorative plasterwork by Joseph Enzer, and the Rococo dining room and drawing room, by the Adam brothers. There are family portraits by Sir Henry Raeburn and Allan Ramsay.

== Park ==
William Adam designed a semi-formal park around the house, building on the late-17th century formal landscape. This was gradually changed during the 18th century to a more informal layout. The landscape gardener Thomas White (1736–1811) planned a new park in 1791, in the informal style of Capability Brown, and planting continued into the 19th century. A 19th-century formal garden occupies the site of the 18th-century wilderness.
