= List of listed buildings in Dalkeith, Midlothian =

This is a list of listed buildings in the parish of Dalkeith in Midlothian, Scotland.

== List ==
Name	Location	Date Listed	Grid Ref. (Note: Sometimes known as OSGB36, the grid reference (where provided) is based on the British national grid reference system used by the Ordnance Survey. • "Guide to National Grid". Ordnance Survey. • "Get-a-map". Ordnance Survey.)	Geo-coordinates	Notes	LB Number (Note: Historic Environment Scotland assign a unique alphanumeric identifier to each designated site in Scotland, for listed buildings this always begins with "LB", for example "LB12345".)	Image
72-76 (Even Nos) St Andrew Street				55°53′47″N 3°03′56″W	Category C(S)	24467	Upload Photo
1 Eskbank Terrace, Tor Lodge				55°53′17″N 3°04′34″W	Category C(S)	24372	Upload Photo
10-14 (Even Nos) Glebe Street, Lanfine And Glebe Lodge With Boundary Wall				55°53′42″N 3°04′18″W	Category C(S)	24374	Upload Photo
High Street, Duke's Gate, Town Lodge And Estate Walls				55°53′52″N 3°03′58″W	Category B	24376	Upload another image
89 And 91 High Street				55°53′41″N 3°04′11″W	Category C(S)	24391	Upload another image
93 High Street And 1 Edinburgh Road				55°53′41″N 3°04′11″W	Category B	24392	Upload another image
105-111 (Odd Nos) High Street				55°53′42″N 3°04′09″W	Category B	24395	Upload Photo
115 And 117 High Street, And 3-6 (Inclusive Nos) Brunton's Close				55°53′42″N 3°04′09″W	Category C(S)	24397	Upload another image
131 And 133 High Street				55°53′45″N 3°04′06″W	Category C(S)	24400	Upload another image
116-120 (Even Nos) High Street				55°53′39″N 3°04′07″W	Category B	24412	Upload Photo
8-11 (Inclusive Nos) London Road				55°53′32″N 3°04′04″W	Category C(S)	24436	Upload Photo
2 Lothian Street, With Outbuildings				55°53′32″N 3°04′08″W	Category B	24439	Upload Photo
4 Lothian Street And 2-6 (Even Nos) Newmills Road, Former Co-Operative Buildings				55°53′34″N 3°04′07″W	Category C(S)	24442	Upload Photo
Old Edinburgh Road, West Church (Church Of Scotland), With Boundary Walls				55°53′39″N 3°04′24″W	Category B	24457	Upload another image
18 Park Road, Meadowbank, With Boundary Walls And Gatepiers				55°53′22″N 3°04′29″W	Category C(S)	24463	Upload Photo
19 Abbey Road, Hobart House, With Boundary Walls, Gatepiers And Gates				55°53′12″N 3°04′29″W	Category B	24321	Upload Photo
71 And 73 Bonnyrigg Road, Cragdale And Fernlea				55°53′01″N 3°05′14″W	Category C(S)	24329	Upload Photo
Cemetery Road, Water Tower				55°53′29″N 3°04′37″W	Category B	24338	Upload another image
8 Lothian Road, Fairfield House, With Boundary Walls And Outbuildings				55°53′30″N 3°04′10″W	Category B	24340	Upload Photo
5 Edinburgh Road				55°53′41″N 3°04′12″W	Category B	24351	Upload Photo
3 And 5 Eskbank Road				55°53′34″N 3°04′20″W	Category B	24357	Upload Photo
7 And 9 Eskbank Road				55°53′34″N 3°04′20″W	Category B	24358	Upload Photo
Dalkeith Park, Montagu Bridge Including Cauld		9 March 1992		55°54′06″N 3°04′02″W	Category A	1440	Upload another image
Dalkeith Park, Stables And Coach House		9 March 1992		55°54′05″N 3°03′41″W	Category A	1442	Upload Photo
Lugton Walled Gardens, Head Gardener's House		9 March 1992		55°53′55″N 3°04′32″W	Category B	1433	Upload Photo
1-9 (Inclusive Nos) Thornybank Cottages And Gateway To Thornybank Steading		9 March 1992		55°53′52″N 3°03′12″W	Category C(S)	1434	Upload Photo
Thornybank House		9 March 1992		55°53′52″N 3°03′08″W	Category C(S)	1435	Upload Photo
Dalkeith Park, Laundry House		9 March 1992		55°54′10″N 3°03′39″W	Category B	1439	Upload another image
23, 25 And 27 South Street				55°53′37″N 3°04′09″W	Category B	24472	Upload Photo
Station Road, Former Eskbank And Dalkeith Station, Foot Bridge, Road Bridge And Platforms				55°53′18″N 3°04′57″W	Category B	24473	Upload Photo
44 Eskbank Road, Woodville				55°53′22″N 3°04′46″W	Category B	24369	Upload Photo
13 And 15 Glebe Street, Glebe Bank House, With Garden And Boundary Walls				55°53′43″N 3°04′20″W	Category B	24373	Upload Photo
9-13 (Odd Nos) High Street				55°53′36″N 3°04′20″W	Category C(S)	24380	Upload another image
165-169 (Odd Nos) High Street				55°53′49″N 3°04′02″W	Category B	24404	Upload another image
100 And 102 High Street, Clydesdale Bank				55°53′40″N 3°04′11″W	Category B	24408	Upload another image
168-172 (Even Nos) High Street				55°53′43″N 3°04′05″W	Category B	24416	Upload another image
196 And 198 High Street				55°53′46″N 3°04′02″W	Category B	24421	Upload another image
212 And 214 High Street				55°53′48″N 3°04′01″W	Category B	24423	Upload another image
9 Lasswade Road, Bernafay				55°53′18″N 3°04′54″W	Category B	24432	Upload Photo
1-5 (Inclusive Nos) London Road				55°53′31″N 3°04′07″W	Category B	24434	Upload Photo
6 London Road				55°53′31″N 3°04′06″W	Category B	24435	Upload Photo
Old Edinburgh Road, New Burial Ground, Watch Tower				55°53′38″N 3°04′21″W	Category B	24456	Upload another image
12 Old Edinburgh Road, West Church Manse				55°53′37″N 3°04′24″W	Category B	24458	Upload Photo
2 Bridgend, The Neuk, With Outbuildings				55°53′49″N 3°04′24″W	Category C(S)	24330	Upload Photo
4 Bridgend, Craigievar				55°53′49″N 3°04′24″W	Category C(S)	24331	Upload Photo
25 Croft Street				55°53′32″N 3°04′17″W	Category C(S)	24344	Upload Photo
Edinburgh Road, Grannies Park, Dalkeith Mills				55°53′46″N 3°04′24″W	Category B	24347	Upload Photo
Elmfield Court, Former Barracks				55°53′35″N 3°04′02″W	Category C(S)	24354	Upload Photo
Eskbank Road, St David's Church, With Boundary Walls And Gatepiers				55°53′27″N 3°04′32″W	Category A	24355	Upload another image See more images
Dalkeith Park, Conservatory		9 March 1992		55°54′08″N 3°03′36″W	Category A	1410	Upload another image See more images
22 Ironmills Road, Lade Cottage				55°53′42″N 3°04′40″W	Category C(S)	49659	Upload Photo
2 And 4 St Andrew Street, The Old Mealmarket Inn				55°53′36″N 3°04′09″W	Category C(S)	24465	Upload Photo
64-70 (Even Nos) St Andrew Street				55°53′46″N 3°03′56″W	Category C(S)	24466	Upload Photo
5 And 7 Station Road				55°53′17″N 3°04′56″W	Category C(S)	24474	Upload Photo
Woodburn Road Gatepiers To Former Woodburn House Opposite Post Office				55°53′36″N 3°03′28″W	Category B	24478	Upload Photo
5 And 7 High Street				55°53′36″N 3°04′20″W	Category C(S)	24379	Upload another image
67-71 (Odd Nos) High Street				55°53′40″N 3°04′14″W	Category B	24385	Upload another image
153 And 155 High Street				55°53′47″N 3°04′03″W	Category C(S)	24402	Upload Photo
122-126 High Street				55°53′40″N 3°04′09″W	Category B	24413	Upload another image
Ironmills Park, Ironmills, Miller's House				55°53′31″N 3°04′45″W	Category B	24428	Upload Photo
2B Lothian Street				55°53′33″N 3°04′08″W	Category C(S)	24440	Upload Photo
6 Newbattle Road, Appin Lodge				55°53′16″N 3°04′46″W	Category B	24448	Upload Photo
14 Newbattle Road, Greenend				55°53′15″N 3°04′42″W	Category C(S)	24450	Upload Photo
Newmills Road, Dalkeith High School				55°53′36″N 3°03′50″W	Category B	24451	Upload Photo
9 Park Road, Roseneuk				55°53′19″N 3°04′38″W	Category C(S)	24459	Upload Photo
11 Park Road, Hollybush				55°53′20″N 3°04′38″W	Category C(S)	24460	Upload Photo
18 Ancrum Road, Dalriada House, With Boundary Walls And Gatepiers				55°53′12″N 3°04′41″W	Category B	24324	Upload Photo
51 And 53 Bonnyrigg Road				55°53′04″N 3°05′09″W	Category C(S)	24327	Upload Photo
Cemetery Road, New Cemetery, Lodge, Gatepiers And Gates				55°53′29″N 3°04′37″W	Category C(S)	24337	Upload Photo
21 And 23 Croft Street				55°53′33″N 3°04′18″W	Category C(S)	24343	Upload Photo
27-35 (Odd Nos) Croft Street, Former Tannery				55°53′32″N 3°04′16″W	Category B	24345	Upload Photo
Dalkeith Park, Dark Walk, Gateway And Walls		9 March 1992		55°53′51″N 3°03′34″W	Category A	1412	Upload Photo
Dalkeith Park, Gamekeeper's House		9 March 1992		55°54′06″N 3°03′22″W	Category B	1413	Upload Photo
Dalkeith Park, King's Gate, Walls And Lodge		9 March 1992		55°53′51″N 3°05′09″W	Category A	1437	Upload another image
Dalkeith Park, Laundry Bridge		9 March 1992		55°54′10″N 3°03′36″W	Category B	1438	Upload Photo
14 Park Road, Waverley Cottage, Including Boundary Walls, Gates, Gatepiers, Forecourt And Outbuilding				55°53′19″N 3°04′35″W	Category C(S)	49690	Upload Photo
4 Edinburgh Road				55°53′41″N 3°04′10″W	Category C(S)	24477	Upload Photo
53 Eskbank Road, Gilston Lodge, With Boundary Walls And Gatepiers				55°53′22″N 3°04′42″W	Category C(S)	24364	Upload Photo
40 Eskbank Road, Elm Lodge, With Boundary Walls And Gatepiers				55°53′24″N 3°04′44″W	Category B	24367	Upload Photo
46 Eskbank Road, Beechmohr, And 1 Avenue Road, Dunmohr, With Boundary Walls And Gatepiers				55°53′21″N 3°04′48″W	Category C(S)	24370	Upload Photo
High Street, Old Kirk (Church Of Scotland, Formerly East Church (St Nicholas)), With Graveyard Walls And Watch House				55°53′44″N 3°04′08″W	Category A	24377	Upload another image
77 And 79 High Street				55°53′40″N 3°04′13″W	Category C(S)	24387	Upload another image
95-99 (Odd Nos) High Street				55°53′41″N 3°04′10″W	Category C(S)	24393	Upload another image
128-134 (Even Nos) High Street				55°53′41″N 3°04′08″W	Category B	24414	Upload Photo
Ironmills Park, Pavilion				55°53′38″N 3°04′44″W	Category B	24430	Upload Photo
13 And 15 Lasswade Road, With Boundary Walls				55°53′19″N 3°05′00″W	Category C(S)	24433	Upload Photo
2-6 (Even Nos) Lothian Road				55°53′31″N 3°04′10″W	Category B	24438	Upload Photo
23 Newbattle Road				55°53′14″N 3°04′33″W	Category C(S)	24447	Upload Photo
8 Newbattle Road, Hazelbank				55°53′16″N 3°04′45″W	Category B	24449	Upload Photo
13 And 15 Park Road, The Lilacs And Ellon Cottage				55°53′20″N 3°04′36″W	Category C(S)	24461	Upload Photo
20 Ancrum Road And 24 Newbattle Road, Dunallan, With Boundary Walls, Gatepiers And Gates				55°53′13″N 3°04′39″W	Category B	24322	Upload Photo
55 And 57 Bonnyrigg Road, Pentland View And Beulah				55°53′04″N 3°05′10″W	Category C(S)	24328	Upload Photo
2-8 (Even Nos) Buccleuch Street, Municipal Buildings				55°53′34″N 3°04′19″W	Category B	24334	Upload another image
20 Edinburgh Road, Airdene With Boundary Walls And Gatepiers				55°53′45″N 3°04′14″W	Category B	24353	Upload Photo
49 Eskbank Road, The Birks, With Boundary Walls And Gatepiers				55°53′23″N 3°04′41″W	Category B	24362	Upload Photo
2 And 4 Eskbank Road, Harrow Hotel				55°53′35″N 3°04′22″W	Category C(S)	24365	Upload Photo
14 Glenesk Crescent, Eskbank House, With Boundary Walls And Gatepiers				55°53′25″N 3°04′47″W	Category A	24375	Upload Photo
1 And 3 High Street, And 1 Old Edinburgh Road				55°53′36″N 3°04′20″W	Category C(S)	24378	Upload another image
15 And 17 High Street				55°53′37″N 3°04′20″W	Category C(S)	24381	Upload another image
119 High Street				55°53′43″N 3°04′09″W	Category C(S)	24398	Upload another image
135 And 137 High Street				55°53′45″N 3°04′06″W	Category B	24401	Upload Photo
177 High Street, Dalkeith Park House				55°53′51″N 3°04′01″W	Category B	24406	Upload another image
10 And 12 High Street				55°53′36″N 3°04′18″W	Category B	24407	Upload Photo
112 And 114 High Street				55°53′40″N 3°04′09″W	Category B	24411	Upload another image
182 High Street, Cross Keys Hotel				55°53′44″N 3°04′04″W	Category B	24418	Upload Photo
200 High Street And 61 St Andrew Street, Corn Exchange				55°53′46″N 3°04′00″W	Category A	24422	Upload another image
4A And 4B Lothian Street Including Courtyard And Range To E				55°53′33″N 3°04′08″W	Category C(S)	24441	Upload Photo
1 And 3 Musselburgh Road, With Outbuildings				55°53′50″N 3°03′55″W	Category C(S)	24445	Upload Photo
21 Newbattle Road, Orwell Bank				55°53′14″N 3°04′34″W	Category C(S)	24446	Upload Photo
2 Avenue Road, Strathesk, With Boundary Walls And Gatepiers				55°53′22″N 3°04′48″W	Category B	24325	Upload Photo
17 And 19 Croft Street				55°53′33″N 3°04′18″W	Category C(S)	24342	Upload Photo
10 Dalhousie Road, Parkend House				55°53′16″N 3°04′52″W	Category C(S)	24346	Upload Photo
Edinburgh Road, Lugton Bridge				55°53′48″N 3°04′25″W	Category B	24349	Upload Photo
17 And 19 Eskbank Road				55°53′34″N 3°04′21″W	Category C(S)	24359	Upload Photo
Gilmerton Road, Glenarch, Summerhouse		9 March 1992		55°53′33″N 3°05′02″W	Category C(S)	1443	Upload Photo
Dalkeith Park, Hermitage		9 March 1992		55°54′16″N 3°04′21″W	Category B	1414	Upload Photo
129 High Street, Lodge Dalkeith Kilwinning No 10 (Masonic Lodge)				55°53′46″N 3°04′09″W	Category B	47371	Upload Photo
12 Park Road, Ardchattan Including Boundary Walls And Gatepiers				55°53′19″N 3°04′35″W	Category C(S)	49619	Upload Photo
84-90 (Even Nos) St Andrew Street				55°53′48″N 3°03′55″W	Category C(S)	24469	Upload another image
13 Waverley Road, Glencairn				55°53′20″N 3°04′26″W	Category B	24475	Upload Photo
48 Eskbank Road, Langlands Lodge, With Boundary Walls And Gatepiers				55°53′21″N 3°04′49″W	Category B	24371	Upload Photo
41 High Street				55°53′38″N 3°04′17″W	Category C(S)	24383	Upload Photo
75 High Street				55°53′40″N 3°04′13″W	Category B	24386	Upload another image
113 High Street, And 1A, 1B Brunton's Close				55°53′42″N 3°04′08″W	Category B	24396	Upload Photo
161 And 163 High Street				55°53′47″N 3°04′03″W	Category B	24403	Upload Photo
104 And 106 High Street				55°53′39″N 3°04′09″W	Category B	24409	Upload another image
12 Melville Road, Linsandel House, With Outbuildings, Boundary Walls, Gates And Gatepiers				55°53′22″N 3°04′53″W	Category A	24443	Upload Photo
Newmills Road, Dalkeith Lodge (Newbattle Abbey West Lodge), With Gateway And Adjoining Wall				55°53′31″N 3°04′00″W	Category A	24452	Upload another image
Newmills Road, Newmills Bridge				55°53′32″N 3°03′46″W	Category B	24453	Upload Photo
22 Park Road, Stonefield With Boundary Wall And Gatepiers				55°53′24″N 3°04′27″W	Category C(S)	24464	Upload Photo
8 Bridgend, Rosecot, With Railings				55°53′49″N 3°04′26″W	Category C(S)	24333	Upload Photo
45 Buccleuch Street, Black Bull				55°53′33″N 3°04′10″W	Category B	24335	Upload Photo
Cemetery Road, Bridge				55°53′28″N 3°04′35″W	Category B	24336	Upload Photo
Croft Street, Fairfield House, Hot House				55°53′31″N 3°04′10″W	Category A	24339	Upload Photo
3 Edinburgh Road, Full Gospel Church				55°53′41″N 3°04′11″W	Category C(S)	24350	Upload Photo
Eskbank Road, St John's And King's Park Church (Church Of Scotland), With Boundary Walls				55°53′31″N 3°04′23″W	Category B	24356	Upload another image
Glenesk Railway Viaduct		9 March 1992		55°53′33″N 3°04′58″W	Category A	1445	Upload Photo
Cowden Cleugh Cottage		9 March 1992		55°53′59″N 3°02′20″W	Category B	1409	Upload Photo
Dalkeith Park, Dalkeith House, With Retaining Wall And Lamp Standards		9 March 1992		55°53′59″N 3°04′04″W	Category A	1411	Upload another image
Dalkeith Park, Icehouse		9 March 1992		55°53′54″N 3°04′03″W	Category B	1415	Upload another image
Lugton Walled Gardens (Formerly To Dalkeith House) Including Upper Walled Garden, Lower Walled Garden, Boundary Wall To E And Lugton Brae Retaining Wall To E Of Main Entrance				55°53′54″N 3°04′26″W	Category C(S)	49624	Upload Photo
78-82 (Even Nos) St Andrew Street				55°53′47″N 3°03′55″W	Category C(S)	24468	Upload Photo
11 South Street				55°53′38″N 3°04′11″W	Category B	24470	Upload Photo
2 Edinburgh Road				55°53′41″N 3°04′10″W	Category C(S)	24476	Upload Photo
51 Eskbank Road, With Boundary Walls And Gatepiers				55°53′23″N 3°04′42″W	Category C(S)	24363	Upload Photo
38 Eskbank Road, With Boundary Walls And Gatepiers				55°53′26″N 3°04′42″W	Category C(S)	24366	Upload Photo
37 And 39 High Street				55°53′38″N 3°04′18″W	Category C(S)	24382	Upload another image
43 High Street				55°53′39″N 3°04′17″W	Category C(S)	24384	Upload another image
81 High Street				55°53′41″N 3°04′13″W	Category C(S)	24388	Upload another image
83 And 85 High Street				55°53′40″N 3°04′12″W	Category B	24389	Upload another image
87 High Street				55°53′41″N 3°04′12″W	Category C(S)	24390	Upload another image
101 And 103 High Street				55°53′41″N 3°04′10″W	Category B	24394	Upload Photo
175 High Street, Militia House				55°53′50″N 3°04′01″W	Category C(S)	24405	Upload another image
108 And 110 High Street				55°53′40″N 3°04′09″W	Category C(S)	24410	Upload another image
140 And 142 High Street				55°53′42″N 3°04′07″W	Category B	24415	Upload another image
176-180 (Even Nos) High Street, Dalkeith Tolbooth				55°53′43″N 3°04′04″W	Category A	24417	Upload another image See more images
216 And 218 High Street				55°53′48″N 3°04′01″W	Category C(S)	24424	Upload another image
Ironmills Park, Ironmills, Cartshed Range				55°53′32″N 3°04′43″W	Category B	24426	Upload Photo
Ironmills Park, Ironmills, Iron Mill				55°53′30″N 3°04′45″W	Category B	24427	Upload Photo
Ironmills Park, Memorial Bridge				55°53′30″N 3°04′41″W	Category B	24429	Upload Photo
9 Lothian Bank, Mount Lothian, With Boundary Walls, Gatepiers And Lamp Standards				55°53′09″N 3°04′45″W	Category C(S)	24437	Upload Photo
Musselburgh Road, New Cow Bridge				55°53′49″N 3°03′30″W	Category B	24444	Upload another image
Newmills Road, The Old Mill House (Formerly Newmills House)				55°53′29″N 3°03′50″W	Category B	24454	Upload Photo
27 Park Road				55°53′26″N 3°04′30″W	Category C(S)	24462	Upload Photo
6 Bridgend, Tower House				55°53′49″N 3°04′25″W	Category C(S)	24332	Upload Photo
Croft Street, King's Park Primary School				55°53′29″N 3°04′14″W	Category B	24341	Upload Photo
Edinburgh Road, Grannies Park, Former Skinnery				55°53′45″N 3°04′20″W	Category C(S)	24348	Upload Photo
47 Eskbank Road, Belmont, With Boundary Walls, Gates And Gatepiers And Former Coach House				55°53′24″N 3°04′38″W	Category B	24361	Upload Photo
Dalkeith Park, St Mary's Episcopal Chapel, With Lamp Standard		9 March 1992		55°53′53″N 3°03′55″W	Category A	1441	Upload another image See more images
Gilmerton Road, Glenarch, Lodge And Gatepiers		9 March 1992		55°53′29″N 3°05′02″W	Category C(S)	1444	Upload Photo
1 Lugton Brae, Greenacres		9 March 1992		55°53′50″N 3°04′31″W	Category B	1446	Upload Photo
17 Lugton Brae		9 March 1992		55°53′51″N 3°04′40″W	Category C(S)	1447	Upload Photo
6 Lugton Brae, Lugton House, With Boundary Walls And Railings		9 March 1992		55°53′52″N 3°04′35″W	Category C(S)	1432	Upload Photo
Wester Cowden Farmhouse		9 March 1992		55°53′36″N 3°02′22″W	Category C(S)	1436	Upload Photo
21 South Street				55°53′37″N 3°04′10″W	Category B	24471	Upload Photo
42 Eskbank Road, Mayfield Lodge				55°53′23″N 3°04′45″W	Category C(S)	24368	Upload Photo
127 High Street, Birchlea				55°53′45″N 3°04′10″W	Category B	24399	Upload Photo
186 And 188 High Street, Masons Arms				55°53′45″N 3°04′02″W	Category C(S)	24419	Upload Photo
190-194 High Street				55°53′45″N 3°04′02″W	Category C(S)	24420	Upload another image
228 And 230 High Street				55°53′49″N 3°04′00″W	Category B	24425	Upload another image
King's Park, War Memorial				55°53′29″N 3°04′27″W	Category C(S)	24431	Upload another image See more images
28 Newmills Road, Eskside House, With Outbuilding And Boundary Walls				55°53′31″N 3°03′58″W	Category C(S)	24455	Upload Photo
2 Ancrum Road, Greenore				55°53′11″N 3°04′41″W	Category B	24323	Upload Photo
Bonnyrigg Road, Westfield Park, With Gates, Railings, Gatepiers And Boundary Walls				55°53′15″N 3°04′53″W	Category B	24326	Upload Photo
19 Edinburgh Road, With Boundary Walls And Gatepiers				55°53′42″N 3°04′15″W	Category B	24352	Upload Photo
19 Lugton Brae Old Parsonage, With Boundary Wall And Gatepiers		9 March 1992		55°53′50″N 3°04′41″W	Category B	1431	Upload Photo

== Key ==
The scheme for classifying buildings in Scotland is:

- Category A: "buildings of national or international importance, either architectural or historic; or fine, little-altered examples of some particular period, style or building type."
- Category B: "buildings of regional or more than local importance; or major examples of some particular period, style or building type, which may have been altered."
- Category C: "buildings of local importance; lesser examples of any period, style, or building type, as originally constructed or moderately altered; and simple traditional buildings which group well with other listed buildings."

In March 2016 there were 47,288 listed buildings in Scotland. Of these, 8% were Category A, and 50% were Category B, with the remaining 42% being Category C.

== See also ==
- List of listed buildings in Midlothian
