= Corn Exchange, Dalkeith =

Commercial building in Dalkeith, Midlothian, Scotland

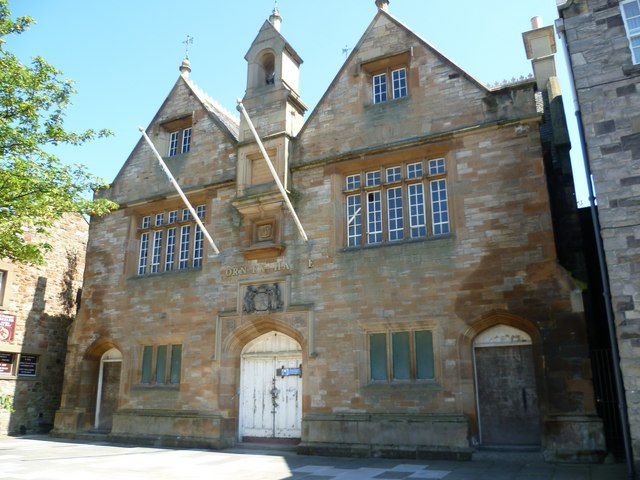
- Corn Exchange, Dalkeith

- Shown in Midlothian
- 55.8962°N 3.0668°W
- Location: High Street, Dalkeith

History
- Built: 1854

Site notes
- Architect: David Cousin
- Architectural style: Jacobethan style

Listed Building – Category A
- Official name: Corn Exchange, 200 High Street And 61 St Andrew Street, Dalkeith
- Designated: 18 October 1972
- Reference no.: LB24422

The Corn Exchange is a commercial building in the High Street, Dalkeith, Midlothian, Scotland. The structure, which is now used as a museum, is a Category A listed building.

== History ==
In the mid-18th century, Walter Montagu Douglas Scott, 5th Duke of Buccleuch launched an initiative to raise enough money, through public subscription, to commission a purpose-built corn exchange for the town. The site he selected had been occupied by the local flesh market.

The building was designed by David Cousin in the Jacobethan style, built in rubble masonry with ashlar stone dressings at a cost of £3,800 and was officially opened on 10 August 1854. The design involved a symmetrical main frontage of three bays facing onto the High Street. The central bay contained an arched doorway with an archivolt and a hood mould which enclosed two small shields and a large stone panel carved with the coat of arms of the Buccleuch family. There was a date stone on the first floor which was surmounted by another panel carved with the words "The Earth is the Lord's and the fulness thereof, Thou crownest the year with Thy goodness" and, above that, there was a central stone bellcote, a finial and a weather vane. The outer bays contained smaller doorways with archivolts on the outside and tri-partite mullioned windows on the inside; the outer bays were fenestrated by mullioned and transomed windows on the first floor and by bi-partite mullioned windows with hood moulds in the gables above. Internally, the principal room was a narrow and long main hall which featured a gallery and a hammerbeam roof.

When it opened, the building was the largest corn exchange in Scotland. The former and future Prime Minister, William Ewart Gladstone, addressed a large audience there as part of his Midlothian campaign in November 1879 and the future Prime Minister, Winston Churchill, spoke there in November 1904.

The use of the building as a corn exchange declined significantly in the wake of the Great Depression of British Agriculture in the late 19th century. It was used by the Scottish Command School of Signalling and Telephony during the First World War and was requisitioned for military use again during the Second World War. After serving as the "Empress Dance Hall" from 1946 until 1961, it was acquired by Ferranti and converted for use as a factory and then as a storage facility.

The building fell vacant in 1986, with its condition deteriorating, until it was acquired by Melville Housing Association in 2013. A major programme of refurbishment works, financed by grants from the Heritage Lottery Fund and Historic Environment Scotland, was then carried out to a design by Michael Laird Architects. The works, which cost £3.5 million, involved the conversion of the building for use as the headquarters of Melville Housing Association and for exhibition space for the Dalkeith Museum. It was officially re-opened by Prince Richard, Duke of Gloucester on 29 June 2016. The refurbishment was the recipient of the Historic Environment Scotland Award for Conservation and Climate Change at the RIAS Awards in 2017. The museum collection includes various local artifacts associated with the First World War including a uniform worn by a soldier of the 8th Battalion, Royal Scots.

== See also ==
- List of listed buildings in Dalkeith, Midlothian
- List of Category A listed buildings in Midlothian
