= Municipal Buildings, Dalkeith =

Municipal Building in Dalkeith, Scotland

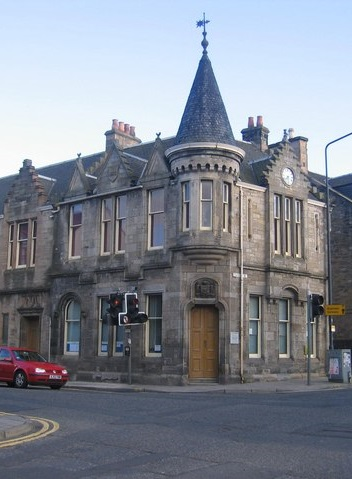
- Municipal Buildings, Dalkeith

- Shown in Midlothian
- 55.8930°N 3.0721°W
- Location: Buccleuch Street, Dalkeith

History
- Built: 1882

Site notes
- Architect: James Pearson Alison
- Architectural style: Scottish baronial style

Listed Building – Category B
- Official name: Municipal Buildings, 2-8 Buccleuch Street, Dalkeith
- Designated: 30 June 1983
- Reference no.: LB24334

The Municipal Buildings are based in Buccleuch Street in Dalkeith, Scotland. The structure, which served as the meeting place of Dalkeith Burgh Council, is a Category B listed building.

== History ==
The first municipal building in the town was Dalkeith Tolbooth in the High Street which was completed in 1648. Following significant population growth, largely associated with the status of Dalkeith as a market town, the area became a police burgh in 1878. In this context, the new burgh commissioners decided to procure a purpose-built municipal structure: the site they selected was occupied by a local reservoir. The old reservoir was demolished and replaced by a water tower in Cemetery Road.

The new building was designed by James Alison (1862–1932) in the Scottish baronial style, built in ashlar stone at a cost of £592 and was used for the first time on 9 October 1882. The design involved a symmetrical rounded frontage at the junction of Buccleuch Street and Eskbank Road; it featured a doorway in a concave moulding with a coat of arms above all surrounded by a stone carving in the form of a rope, and there was a corbelled turret with a conical roof on the first floor. The design for the Eskbank Road elevation involved three bays; the centre bay, which slightly projected on the first floor, featured a three-light window on that floor surmounted by a stepped gable containing a clock. The design for the Buccleuch Street elevation also involved three bays; the left hand bay featured a round headed window on the ground floor, the centre bay was fenestrated with two-light sash windows on both floors and the other bays contained single light sash windows. Internally, the principal room was the council chamber.

The fire service started to store a fire hose in the municipal buildings in order to protect that part of the town in 1885, and the structure was extended by five extra bays along Buccleuch Street to a design by Charles Henry Greig at a cost of £2,000 in 1908. The municipal buildings continued to serve as the headquarters of the burgh council for much of the 20th century but ceased to be local seat of government after the enlarged Midlothian District Council was formed at new offices in White Hart Street in 1975. The complex was subsequently used as the local registration office and also as the local Citizens Advice office.

== See also ==
- List of listed buildings in Dalkeith, Midlothian
