= Beetty Dick =

Scottish town crier (1693–1773)

- engraving by John Kay
- Born: 1693
- Died: 1773 (aged 79–80)
- Occupation: Town crier

Beetty Dick (1693-1773) was an elderly town crier for Dalkeith, a town in Midlothian, Scotland in the mid-18th century.

Instead of using a bell, Dick would beat a wooden plate with a spoon making a loud din to draw attention to announcements, working for just a penny per announcement. She was known for wearing a distinctive long gown, cap and cloak. Dick never married and died in 1773, her remains were interred at the east side of the old Churchyard, Dalkeith.

Dick was drawn by artist John Kay in his published work A Series of Original Portraits and the portrait hangs in an exhibition in a collection at the Dalkeith Museum.
