= Issobell Fergussone =

- Died: 6 August 1661; Dalkeith
- Cause of death: Execution
- Known for: Being accused of witchcraft

Issobell Fergussone or Isobel Ferguson (died 6 August 1661) was a Scottish woman who confessed to witchcraft in Dalkeith, Edinburgh during the year 1661.

Fergussone denied all the accusations against her and asked to be pricked, to try prove her innocence. However, whilst pricking her on 5 July 1661 they were successful in finding the "devil's mark", which led her to confess. The result of this trial led to her execution (strangled and her corpse burnt) on 6 August 1661.

== Early life ==
Not much is known about her before her trial, however she lived in Liberton Parish then moved to Newbattle, Dalkeith and was married to a man named Baxter and had a son named Robert Baxter.

== Accusations ==
The accusations made against her included verbal threats against her neighbours and son. It seems she threatened her neighbours telling them they would become poor, then their horse became ill and they were reduced to poverty. She also had a dispute with her son and told his wife that he would have a bad homecoming, on his return he fell ill and died. She was also accused of adultery and fornication.

== Trials ==
Fergussone's trial took place on 3 July 1661 and she was found guilty. Not only was she charged with witchcraft, she had other charges of adultery and fornication due to a meeting with the devil she described whilst under questioning.

She described the devil as a man named William Twedie, in a black gown who gave her a pair of black gloves. She denied that the devil laid with her. There was 2 William Twedies known to her, her landlord and his half brother. This caused some confusion. She confessed to having an affair with the half brother who later fled. She was believed to have met the devil at either her or William Tweedie's home (between Skloutford and Liberton Road), at her farm yard, or near the bridge at the bank of John Ballingtyne's shore. William Tweedie was always present at her meetings with the devil.
