= Newbyres Castle =

16th-century tower house in Gorebridge, Midlothian, Scotland

Coordinates: 55.8418°N 3.048°W

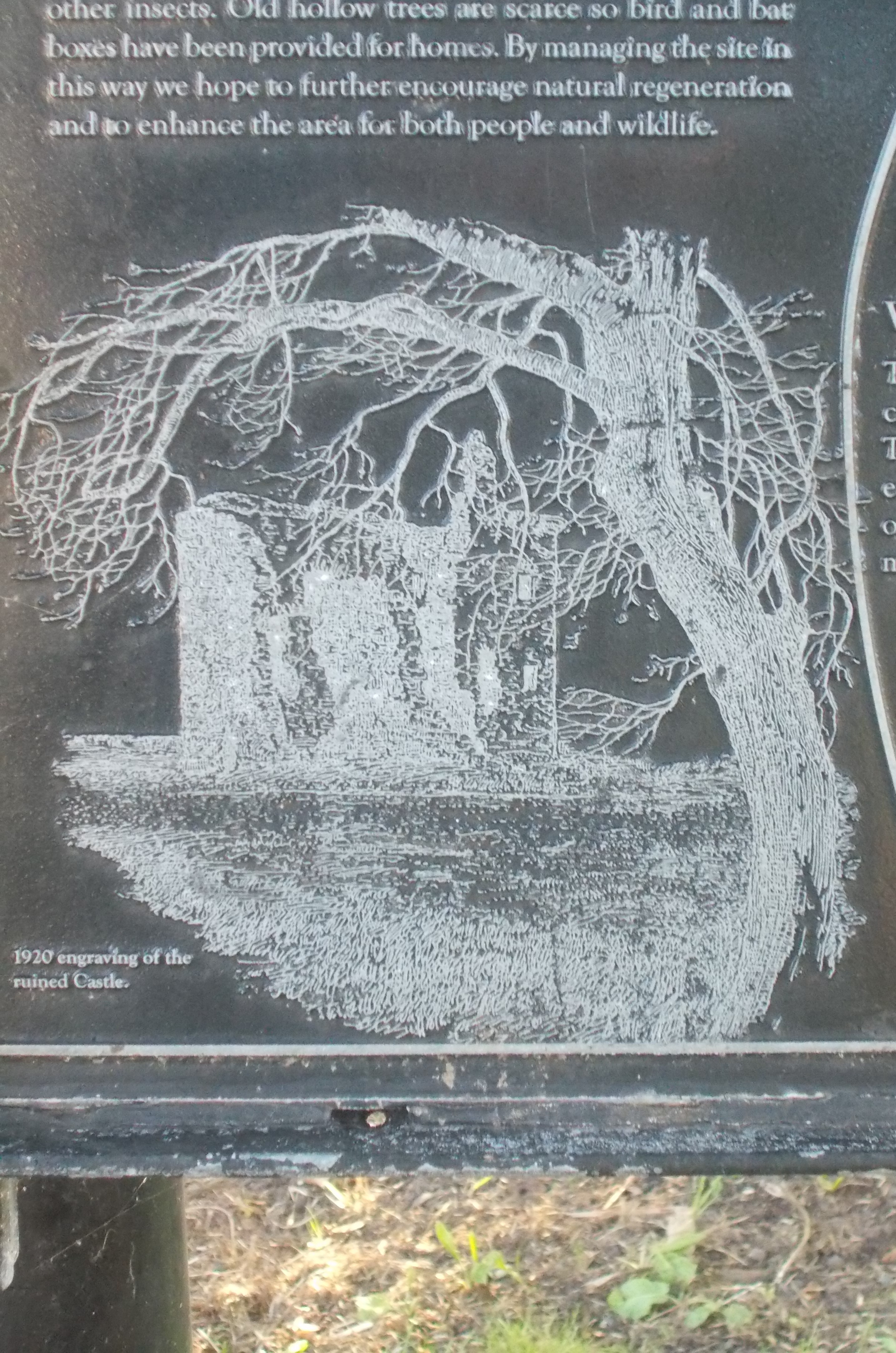
Artist's Impression of the Castle on the Plaque at the Site

Newbyres Castle was a 16th-century tower house, in Gorebridge, Midlothian, Scotland, west of the main street. The tower occupied a roughly triangular position, which was naturally defended by deeply worn water-courses.

== History ==
In 1543 Michael Borthwick of Glengelt acquired the land from James, Abbot of Newbattle, with the consent of the abbey's patroness, Mary, Queen of Scots, and built the property; the castle was purchased by Sir James Dundas of Arniston in 1624.

By the early 20th century Newbyres was in an unsound, ruinous condition, and the local council demolished it in 1963 for reasons of 'public safety'.

== Structure ==
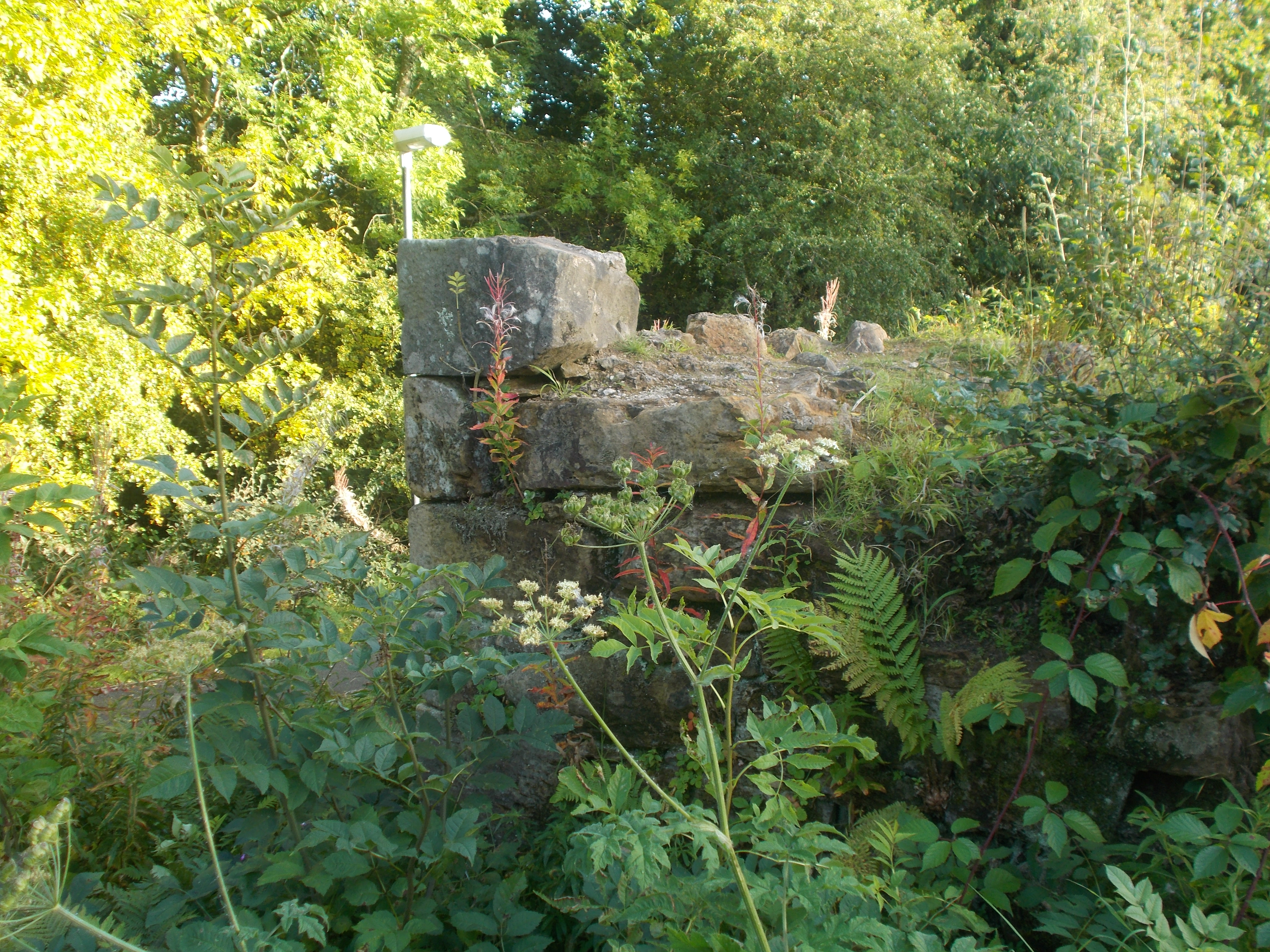
The Remaining Ruins of Newbyres Castle

It had been an L-plan tower, the main block being 32.5 feet (9.9 m) by 24.0 feet (7.3 m). The wing was at the south angle, and measured 15.25 feet (4.65 m) by 5.0 feet (1.5 m). In the early 20th century the walls of the main block facing west and north were complete to the wall-head, the rest being fragmentary. There seems to have been a courtyard wall. The North East corner of the tower, standing to about 4.0 metres (13.1 ft), and a mound of overgrown rubble nearby are all that remain of Newbyres Castle.

The building was rubble-built with freestone quoins; the tower was vaulted, rising from a basement course. There was a boldly projecting corbelled parapet equipped with rounds. There were numerous gun-loops, four at ground level and two at the second floor. The unusual cap-house to the projecting entrance wing collapsed in February 1881.

There was an armorial panel bearing the Borthwick arms.

The remaining structure is a scheduled monument, regarded as of national importance because it provides evidence and has the potential to provide further evidence for the study of the defensive architecture and domestic life of the minor gentry in mid-sixteenth-century Scotland.

== See also ==
- Castles in Great Britain and Ireland
- List of castles in Scotland
