= Mavisbank House =

Country house in Midlothian, Scotland

Coordinates: 55°52′25.61″N 3°8′22.11″W

Designations

Inventory of Gardens and Designed Landscapes in Scotland
- Official name: Mavisbank
- Designated: 30 June 1987
- Reference no.: GDL00275

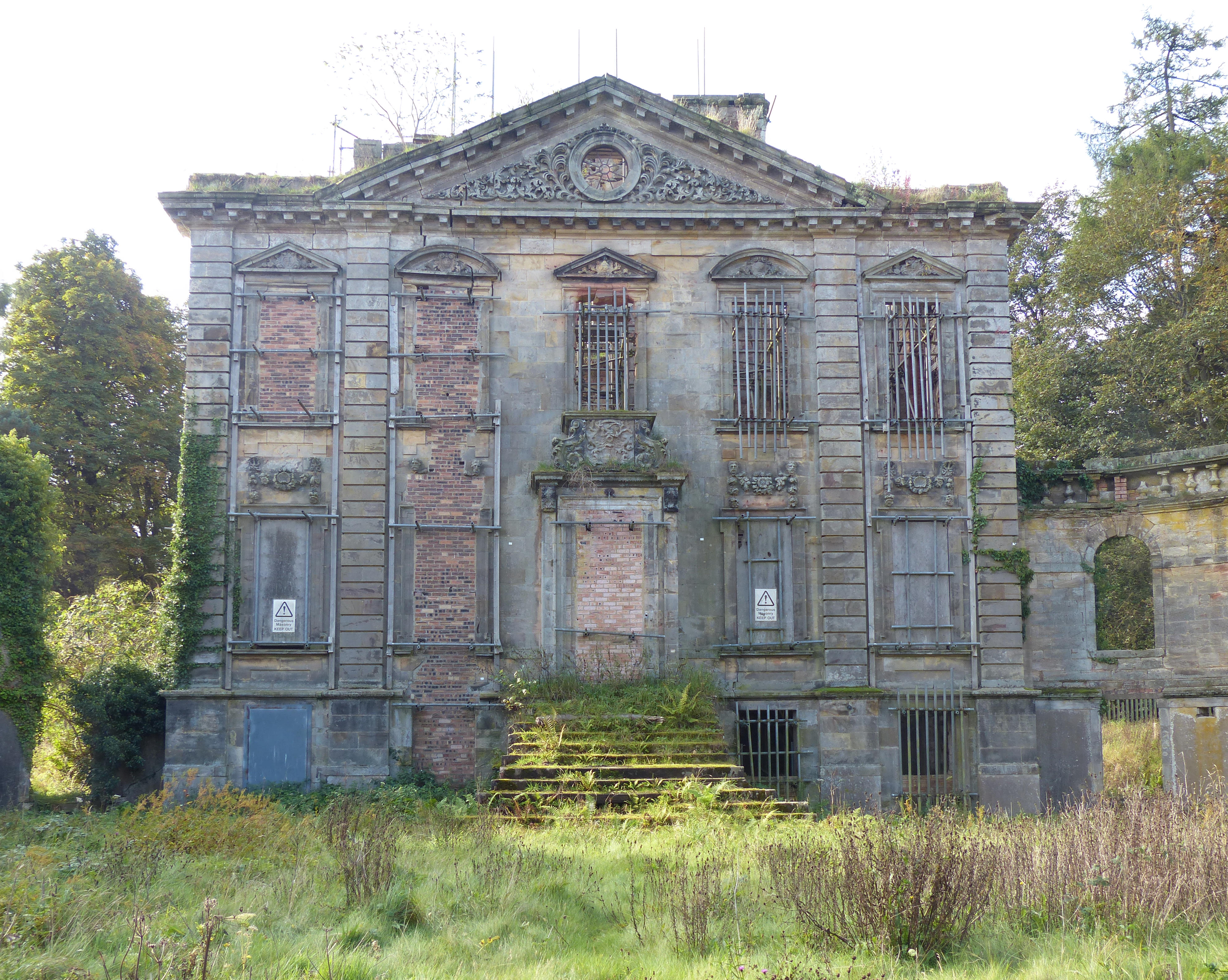
Mavisbank House, main (NE) front in 2023

Mavisbank is a country house outside Loanhead, south of Edinburgh in Midlothian, Scotland. It was designed by architect William Adam in collaboration with his client, Sir John Clerk of Penicuik, and was constructed between 1723 and 1727. The first Palladian villa in Scotland, it is described by Historic Scotland as "one of Scotland's most important country houses." It was altered in the 19th century, but suffered decades of neglect in the 20th century. The interiors were gutted by fire in 1973, and the house remains a ruin, described by Colin McWilliam in 1978 as a "precarious shell". In 2024, a grant of £5.3 million was given to stabilise the building and to enable up-to-date surveys of its condition to be made.

== Design and construction ==
Sir John Clerk's father, the first Baronet of Penicuik, planned a house on the Mavisbank estate in the late 17th century, for which a drawing of 1698 survives. Sir John Clerk, 2nd Baronet (1676–1755) was a Member of the Parliament of Scotland, and, after the union of 1707, of the Parliament of Great Britain. He was also an artistic patron, a composer of music, and an amateur architect. In 1722, he inherited his father's estates, and began planning the new house. Around this time, William Adam was engaged on his first major commission, the remodelling of Hopetoun House for the Earl of Hopetoun. Clerk and Adam collaborated on the design of Mavisbank, which was based on the 1698 proposal. Each claimed the greater part of the credit for the design. Clerk wrote in a letter that he designed the house "under the correction of Mr Adam, a talented architect", while Adam credited the design to himself in his book, Vitruvius Scoticus. It is clear that Adam enjoyed an unusually close relationship with his client, despite their differences of opinion. Clerk certainly criticised some of Adam's suggestions, although surviving correspondence suggests Adam got his way on a number of points. The foundations were laid in 1723, with construction entrusted to the mason and contractor John Baxter Senior, with stone carved by William Sylverstyne. However, William Adam himself was later appointed to complete the works.

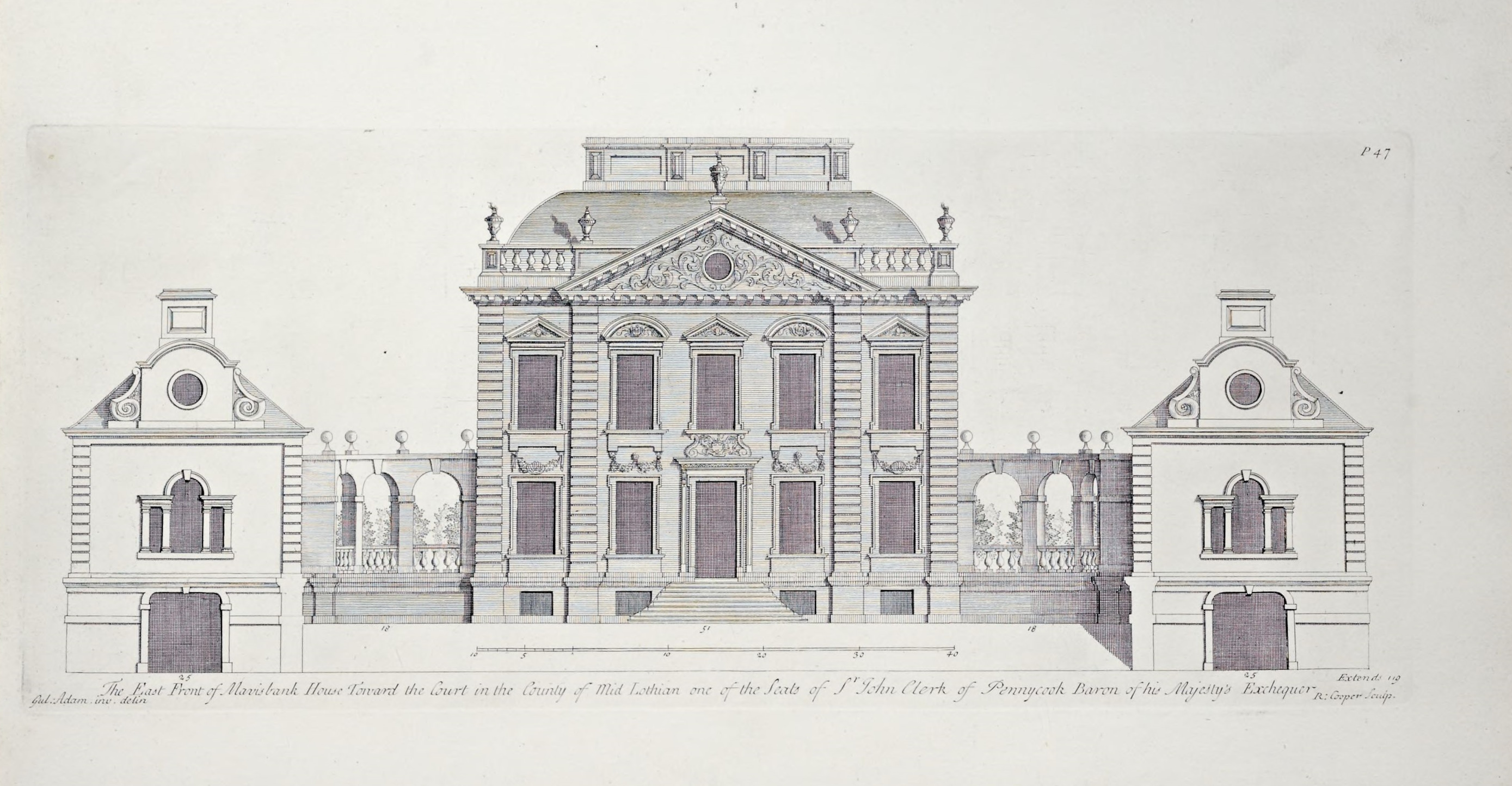
Mavisbank House from Vitruvius Scoticus, 1810

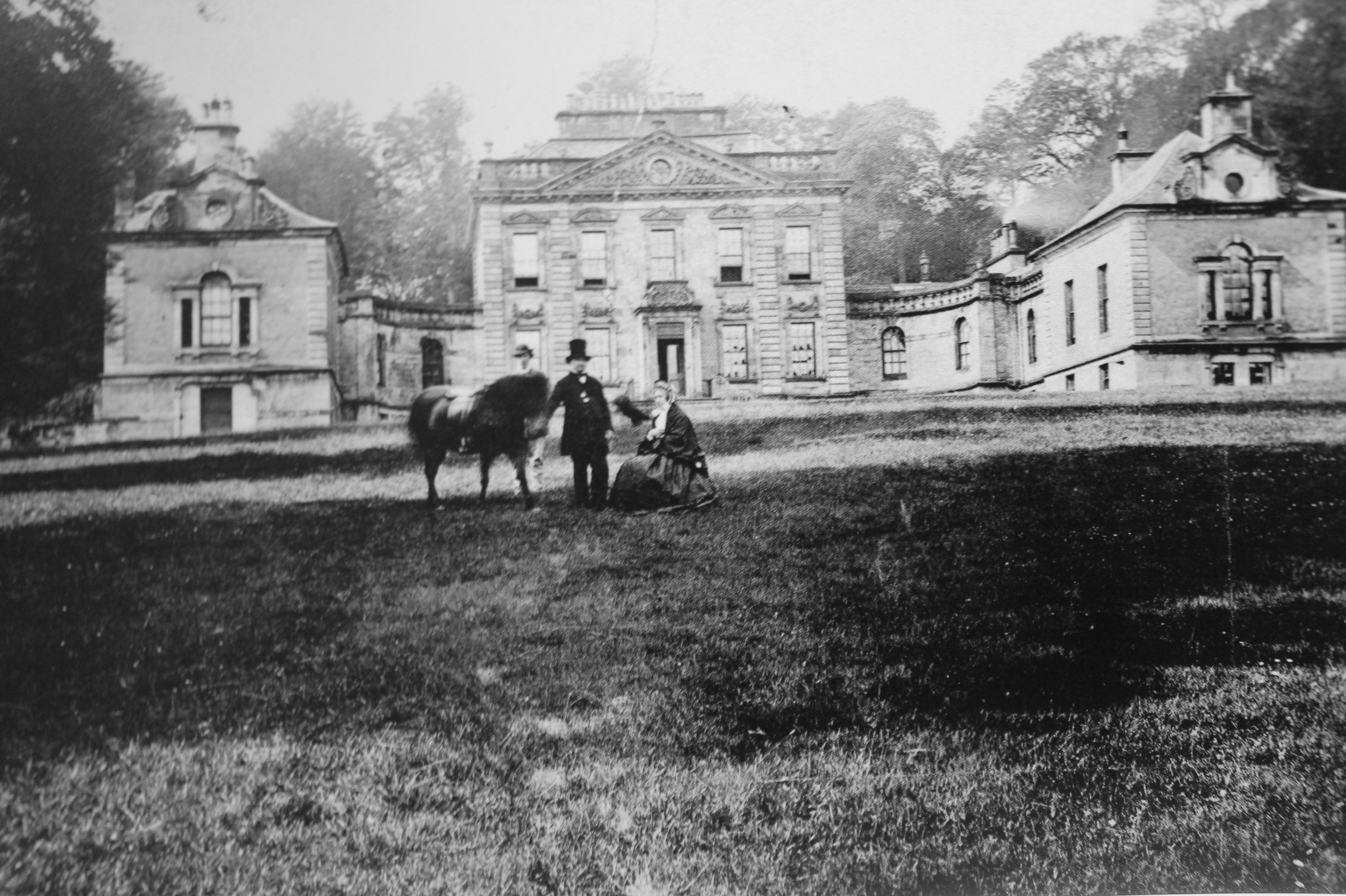
Mavisbank House c.1870

== Garden ==
A brick-lined walled garden was built in 1739 in a circular form based on the Colosseum.

== Later history and decline ==
The house passed out of the Clerk family in 1815. In 1840, the house was extended, possibly to designs by Thomas Hamilton, the symmetrical additions including a ballroom. The building became an asylum in 1876. Additions were made to the front of the pavilions in the 1880s. Further extensions were made in the 1920s, but in 1946, Dr W. M. Harrowes, Medical Superintendent for Edinburgh purchased the property, and demolished all the additions made since the 18th century. In 1954 he commissioned Robert Hurd to restore the building but much of the intended restoration of the house went unrealised.

In the late 1950s, the forecourt was used as a car park for cars both used and scrap by local man Archie Stevenson, and further neglect set in. The building was gutted by fire in 1973, destroying the roof and interiors. In 1986, Mr Stevenson was evicted from Mavisbank along with several other people who stayed in caravans on the property. Ownership of the house remained uncertain, however, as Stevenson had sold portions of the property to three possibly fictitious persons in the United States. In July 2008, Historic Scotland was still pursuing compulsory purchase of the building. The compulsory purchase order was finally issued in October 2026

== Restoration proposals ==
Previous stabilisation work was carried out in the 1980s under emergency powers, following the threatened demolition of the structure. The Mavisbank Trust, a subsidiary of Edinburgh & Lothians Greenspace Trust, was formed in 2002 to explore longer-term solutions for the restoration of the house and grounds. In August 2003, Mavisbank was featured in the BBC Television programme Restoration, in which the public were invited to vote for restoration proposals. Mavisbank reached the final round, but lost out to Manchester's Victoria Baths. In 2008, Historic Scotland examined two options: stabilisation of the building as a ruin; or creation of a "developer's shell", which could be sold and completed by a third party. The Mavisbank Trust continues to work with the community, Historic Scotland, Midlothian Council and Edinburgh & Lothians Greenspace Trust to find a sustainable future for Mavisbank which respects its natural and built heritage value whilst providing greater access to the local communities. A local campaign group, Friends of Mavisbank, has been formed with the aim of promoting some limited architectural intervention, while improving public access to the estate.

In 2016, Historical Environment Scotland removed Mavisbank House and garden from their Scheduled Ancient Monument list.

The Landmark Trust, a building conservation charity with an interest in the future of Mavisbank House, submitted two bids for funding from the National Lottery Heritage Fund, but both were unsuccessful. In May 2024, the Trust was awarded a grant of £5.3 million by the National Heritage Memorial Fund, to be used to stabilise the building and to enable up-to-date surveys of its condition to be made. This is in addition to £1.38 million previously raised by the Trust, with a further £1.16 million being needed to complete the work. The Trust previously estimated that the overall cost of the restoration would be over £12 million.

In 2026 the ruin was reported 'saved' after Midlothian Council acquired it by compulsory purchase, with a plan to transfer it to the Landmark Trust.

== See also ==
- Mavis Bank, a historic coffee estate (and small town) in Jamaica named after Mavisbank House.
