= Dalkeith =

Town in Midlothian, Scotland

Coordinates: 55.8958°N 3.0583°W

Dalkeith: Scottish Gaelic: Dail Cheith
- Town
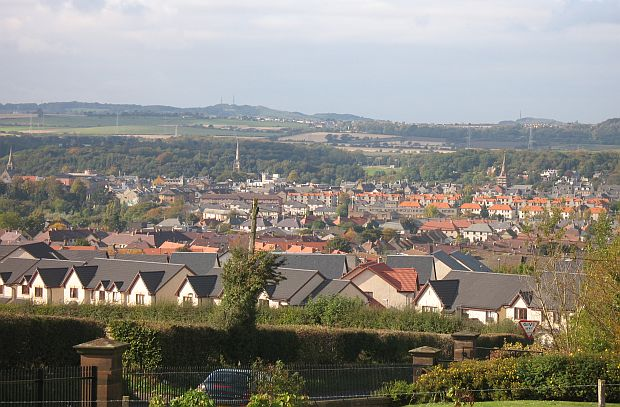
- A view over the townscape of Dalkeith in 2007

- Location within Midlothian
- Population: 15,146 (2022)
- Council area: Midlothian
- Lieutenancy area: Midlothian
- Country: Scotland
- Sovereign state: United Kingdom
- Post town: DALKEITH
- Postcode district: EH22
- Dialling code: 0131
- Police: Scotland
- Fire: Scottish
- Ambulance: Scottish
- UK Parliament: Midlothian
- Scottish Parliament: Midlothian North and Musselburgh

Dalkeith (/dælˈkiːθ/ dal-KEETH; Scottish Gaelic: Dail Cheith, pronounced [t̪al ˈçe]) is a historic market town in Midlothian, Scotland, on the River Esk. It was granted a burgh of barony in 1401 and a burgh of regality in 1541. The settlement of Dalkeith grew southwestwards from its 12th-century castle (now Dalkeith Palace). It had a population of 15,146 in 2022.

The town is divided into four distinct areas: Dalkeith proper with its town centre and historic core; Eskbank (considered to be the well-heeled neighbourhood of Dalkeith with many large Victorian and newer houses) to its west; Woodburn (primarily a working class council estate with pockets of new housing developments) to its east; and Newbattle (a semi-rural village with its abbey) to the south.

Dalkeith is the main administrative centre for Midlothian. It is twinned with Jarnac, France. In 2004, Midlothian Council re-paved Jarnac Court in honour of Dalkeith and Jarnac's long standing link. On the north-eastern edge of Dalkeith at Woodburn is the Dalkeith Campus (completed 2003) – housing both Dalkeith High School and St David's Roman Catholic High School plus community leisure facilities.

== Etymology ==
Dalkeith is understood to be a Cumbric name, cognate with Welsh ddôl 'meadow, plateau, valley' + coed 'wood'.

== Prehistory and archaeology ==
During the construction of the Dalkeith Northern Bypass in 1994-95 and 2006-08 (final construction was delayed for over a decade) archaeologists, working for CFA Archaeology, uncovered many archaeological features and information on the prehistory and history of the area. Their findings included two ring-groove structures, two pit alignments, a Roman temporary camp, a post-medieval building, an 18th-century designed landscape, and two industrial sites with a brick and tile works and a coal pit engine house. Given the wide area covered they were able to surmise the general settlement patterns of Dalkeith over the centuries. Settlement and land use was concentrated on the sands and gravels of the river terraces and only a bit of human occupation on the compacted clays that are found throughout the area. They also determined that people had been living in the Dalkeith area since the Neolithic.

== History ==
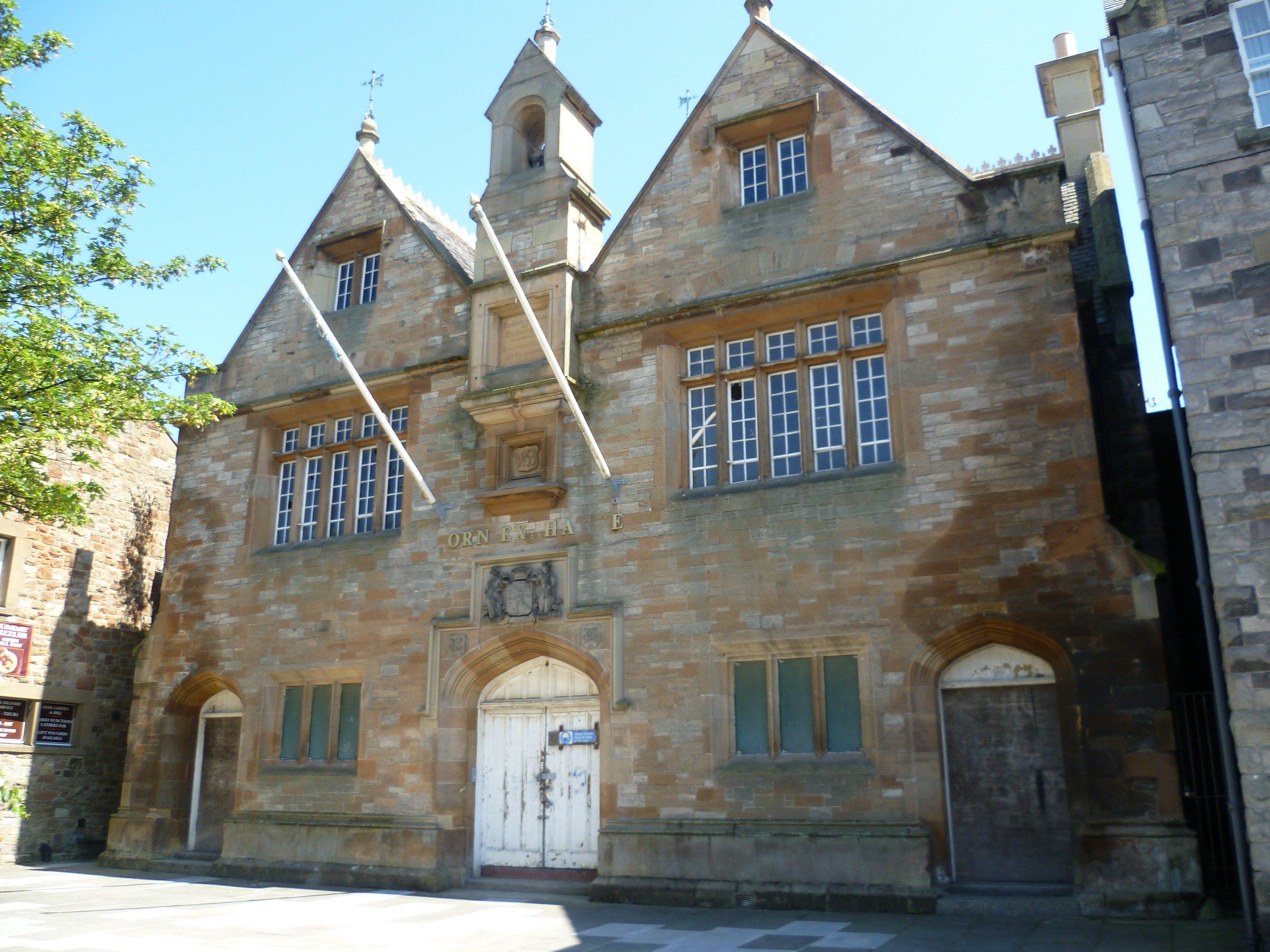
Corn Exchange by David Cousin 1853

One of the earliest historical references to Dalkeith is found in the Chronicles of Jean Froissart, who stayed at Dalkeith Castle for fifteen days. He writes of the Battle of Otterburn and the death of James Douglas, 2nd Earl of Douglas:

"I, author of this book, in my youth had ridden nigh over all the realm of Scotland, and I was then fifteen days in the house of earl William Douglas, father to the same earl James, of whom I spake of now, in a castle of five leagues from Edinburgh which is called in the country Dalkeith. The same time I saw there this earl James, a fair young child, and a sister of his called the lady Blanche."

In 1650, Oliver Cromwell's army came to Dalkeith. His officer General George Monck was Commander in Scotland, and the government of the country was based out of Dalkeith Castle.

In 1831, Dalkeith was linked to Edinburgh by the Edinburgh and Dalkeith Railway, which transported coal, minerals, and agricultural produce. Two decades later, in 1853, a Corn Exchange, at the time the largest indoor grain market in Scotland, was built.

The population in 1841 was 4,831 inhabitants.

In 1879, Dalkeith was where William Ewart Gladstone started his campaign for British Prime Minister, which became known as the "Midlothian campaign".

== Notable buildings ==
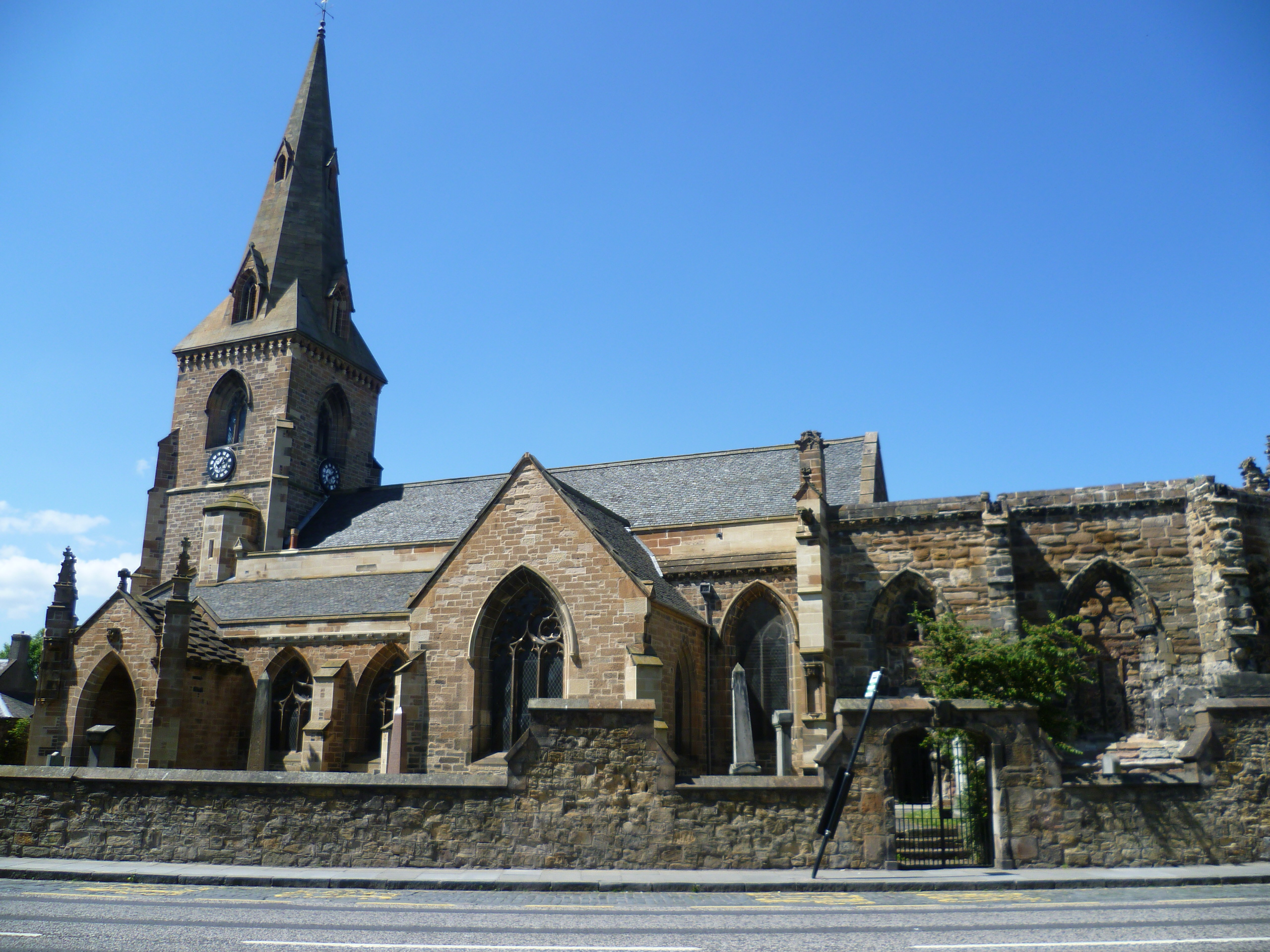
St Nicholas Buccleuch Church

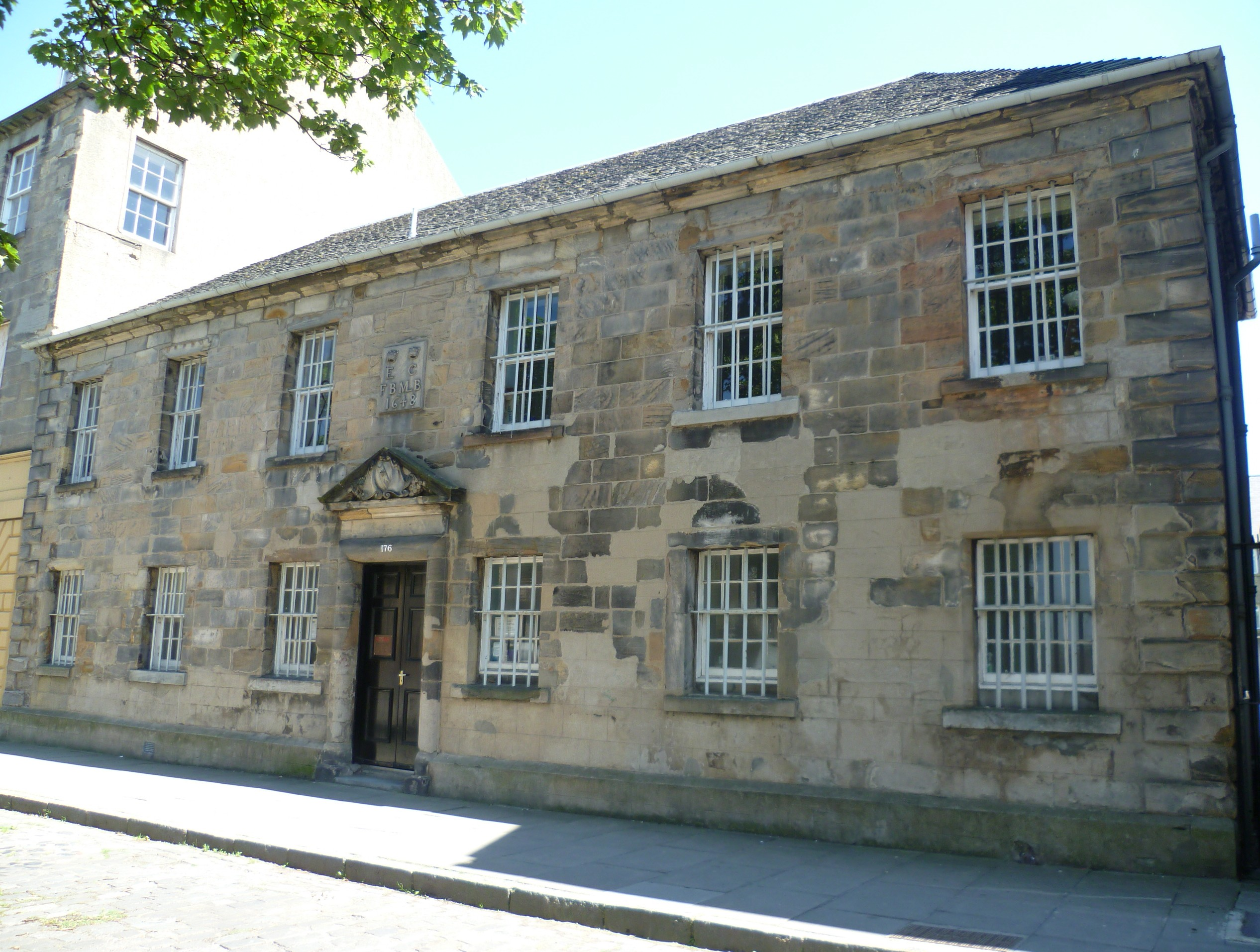
Dalkeith Tolbooth

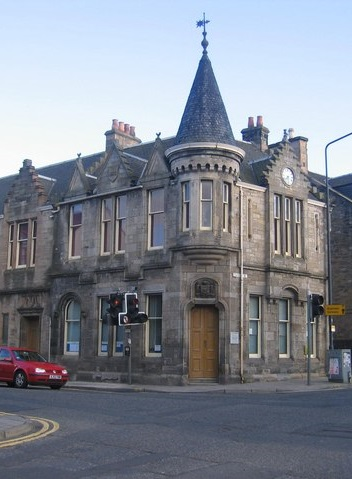
The Municipal Buildings

The Collegiate Church of St Nicholas Buccleuch, formerly known as Dalkeith Parish Church, stands on High Street. Dedicated to St Nicholas, this medieval church became a collegiate establishment in 1406, founded by Sir James Douglas. The nave and transepts date from 1854, when the inside of the church was greatly altered. The chancel was abandoned in 1590, walled off from the rest of the church, and is now ruinous. Sir James Douglas, 1st Earl of Morton, and his wife Joanna, daughter of James I, are buried in the choir and have stone effigies. St Nicholas Buccleuch Church remains one of the two Church of Scotland parish churches in Dalkeith, the other being St John's and King's Park Church. The Episcopal Church, St Mary's is on High Street, at the entrance to Dalkeith Country Park. St David's Church, on Eskbank Road, is the only Roman Catholic church in the town, it is a category A listed building and was built in 1854.

Dalkeith Palace which replaced the castle in the late 16th century and was rebuilt in the early 18th century, lies at the north-east edge of the town. It is a former seat of the Duke of Buccleuch, surrounded by parkland and follies.

The building on High Street now known as Dalkeith Tolbooth dates from 1648 although it was reconstructed in the early 18th century. It incorporated prison cells in the basement, a weigh house on the ground floor and a courtroom on the first floor. In front of the building there is a circle of stones to mark the spot where the last public hanging in Dalkeith took place. William Thomson was hanged here for highway robbery in 1827. The Municipal Buildings in Buccleuch Street were completed in 1882.

Other notable buildings include a Watch Tower at the cemetery (1827), a water tower and early 19th-century iron mills and the Masonic Temple or Lodge Rooms of the Dalkeith Kilwinning Masonic Lodge No.10 situated next to The Collegiate Church of St Nicholas Buccleuch in the high street completed in 1766.

Edinburgh College has its Midlothian Campus in Eskbank, close to the railway station.

There is a modern Church of Jesus Christ of Latter-day Saints (also known as Mormon) meeting house on Newbattle Road.

Midlothian Community Hospital is just outside Dalkeith, located off the A7 road on the eastern edge of the neighbouring town of Bonnyrigg.

== Transport ==
Until 2008, Dalkeith was on the A68, one of the main routes south from Edinburgh to Jedburgh and across the border to Darlington. A bypass to take traffic away from the town centre was completed in September 2008; this then took the A68 number, and the old route of the A68 is now the A6106.

Other main roads serving Dalkeith are:

1. A6094 — leads SW towards Bonnyrigg and Peebles, and NE towards Musselburgh
2. A768 — leads west from Eskbank to Lasswade and Loanhead
3. B6373 — a road wholly within Dalkeith, leaving and rejoining the A6106
4. B6414 – leaves the A6094 on the NE edge of Dalkeith (at Woodburn) and leads NE to Tranent
5. B6392 – runs north–south through Eskbank, and used to be the route of the A7 which leads from Edinburgh to Galashiels and Hawick
6. B703 – leads south from Eskbank, through Newbattle, to Newtongrange
7. B6482 – leaves the A6106 on the SE edge of Dalkeith (at Woodburn) and leads into Easthouses and Mayfield.

The re-building of the northern section of the Waverley Railway Line re-connected Dalkeith to the national rail network after a gap of more than 40 years, with a station at Eskbank on the western edge of Dalkeith. Construction commenced in late 2012, and the line re-opened to passenger services on 6 September 2015.

Bus services in Dalkeith are mostly run by Lothian Buses; East Coast Buses and Borders Buses also serve the town.

For walkers, the Penicuik–Dalkeith Walkway passes close by.

== Sport ==
=== Football ===
The town is home to Dalkeith Thistle F.C., based at King's Park. The club was formed in 1892 and now plays in the East of Scotland Football League, having spent most of its history in the Scottish Junior Football Association.

The established club is affiliated to Dalkeith Thistle Community Football Club, based at Cowden Park, Woodburn; The club is 'SFA Quality Mark' accredited and run by volunteers.

=== Rugby ===
Dalkeith RFC play in the Scottish Rugby Union East Leagues. The club was the first in Midlothian to open full membership to women and the first in the county to run a women's side. Notable former players include Sir David Murray, whose car crash on the way back from a match in North Berwick ended his rugby career and led to him focusing on his business empire. Adam Robson, who went on to become President of the Scottish Rugby Union, also played for the club.

== Gallery ==
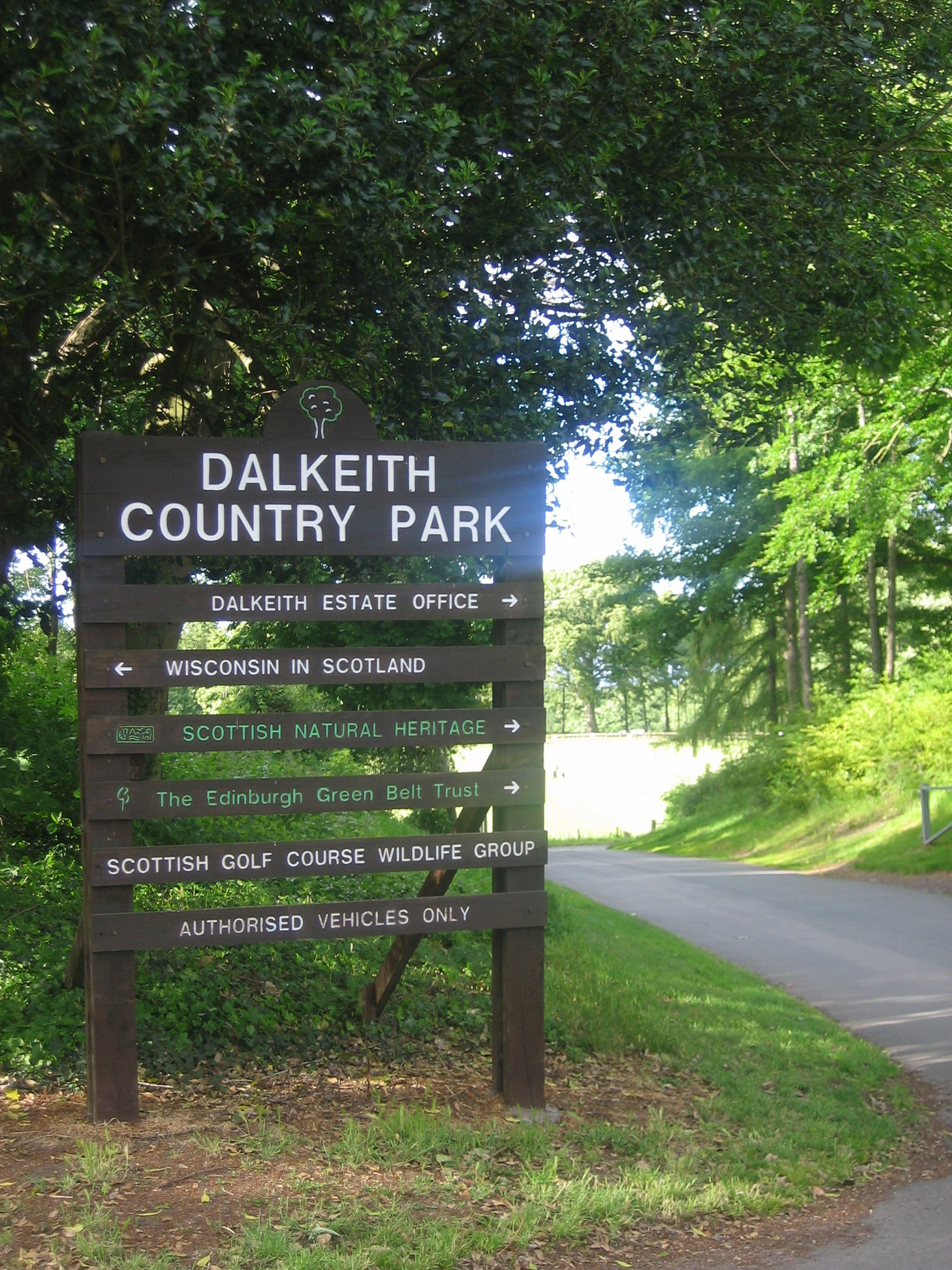
Dalkeith Country Park

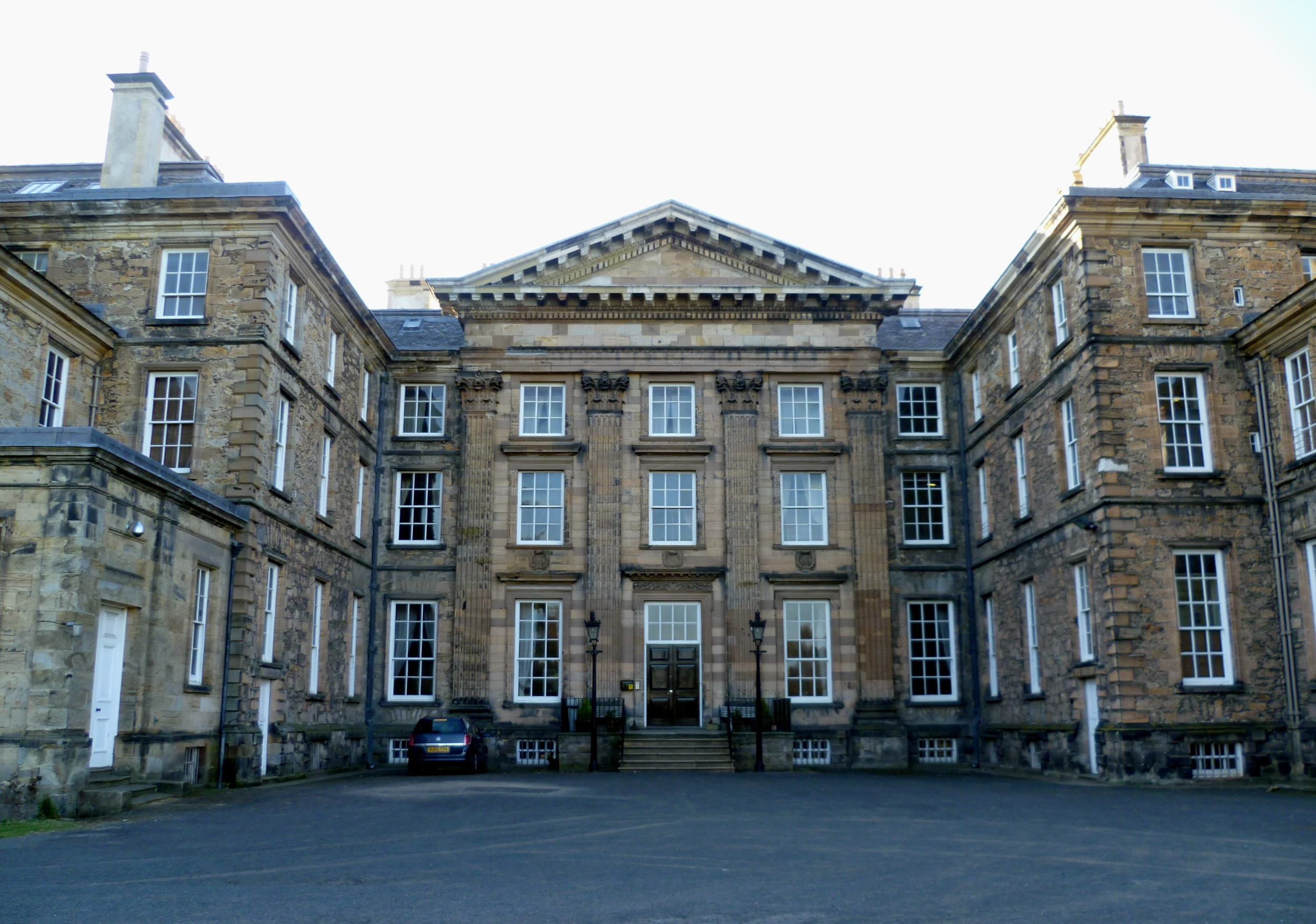
Frontage of Dalkeith Palace

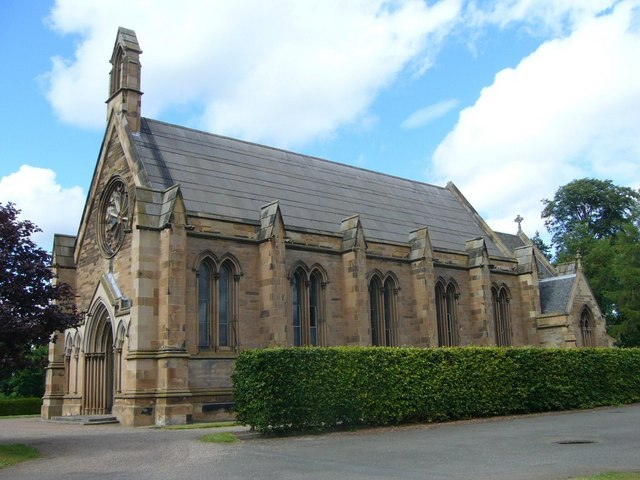
St. Mary's Church on the Buccleuch estate

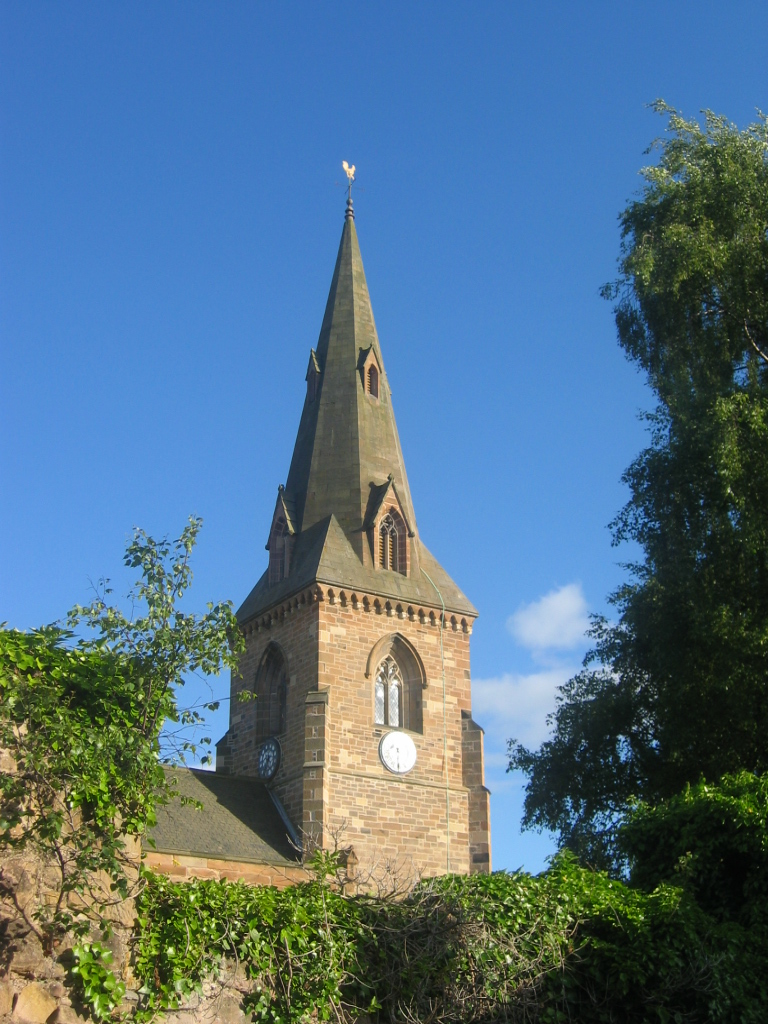
Spire of St. Nicholas-Buccleuch

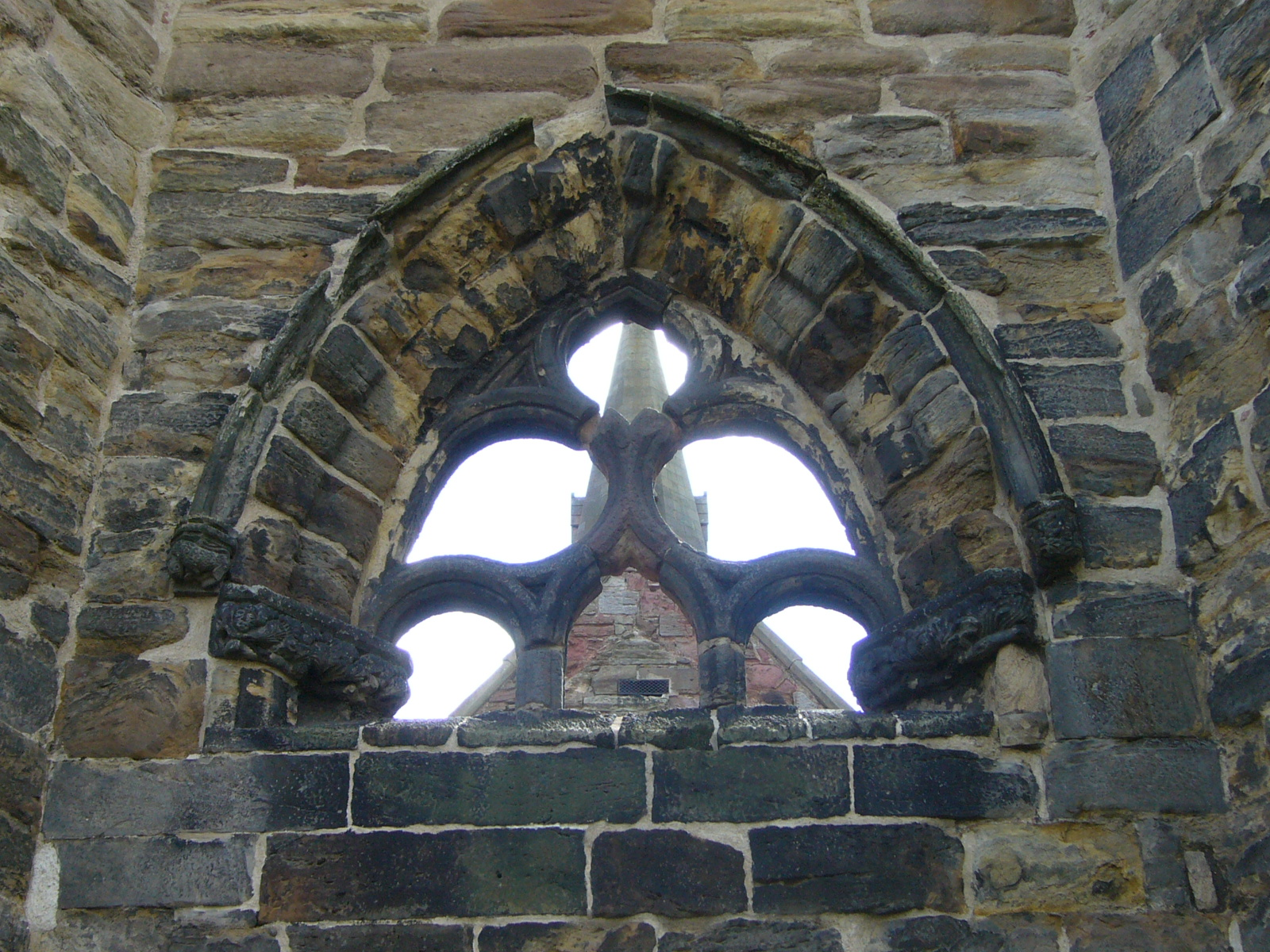
Window tracery, Dalkeith Parish Kirk

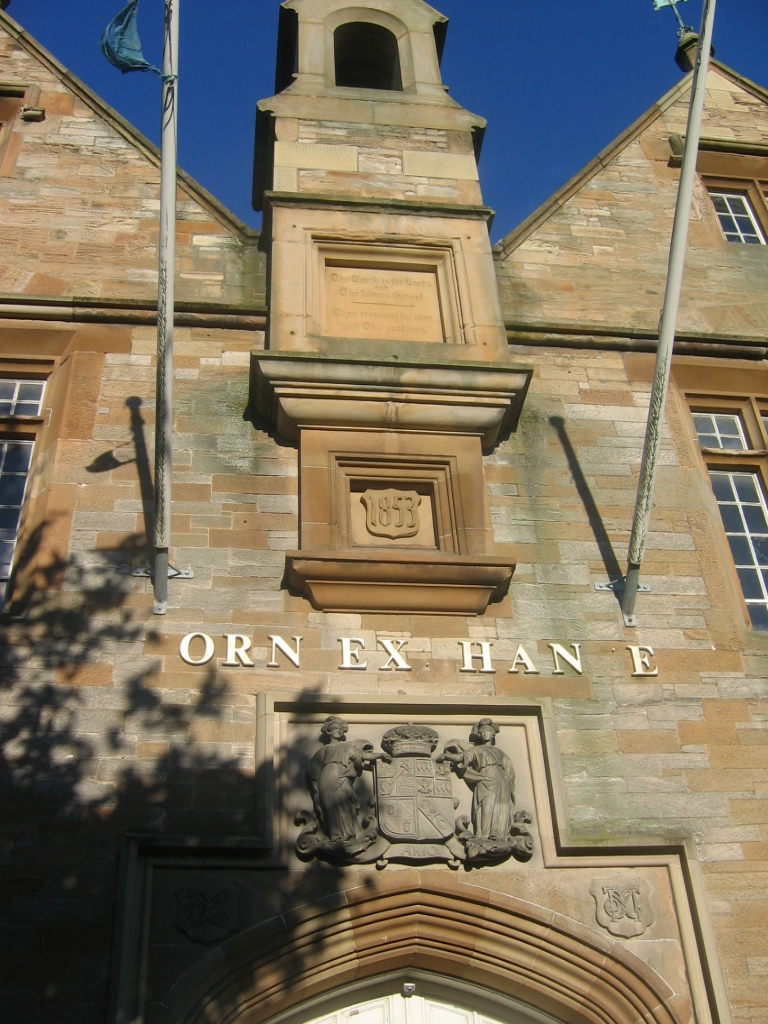
Dalkeith Corn Exchange

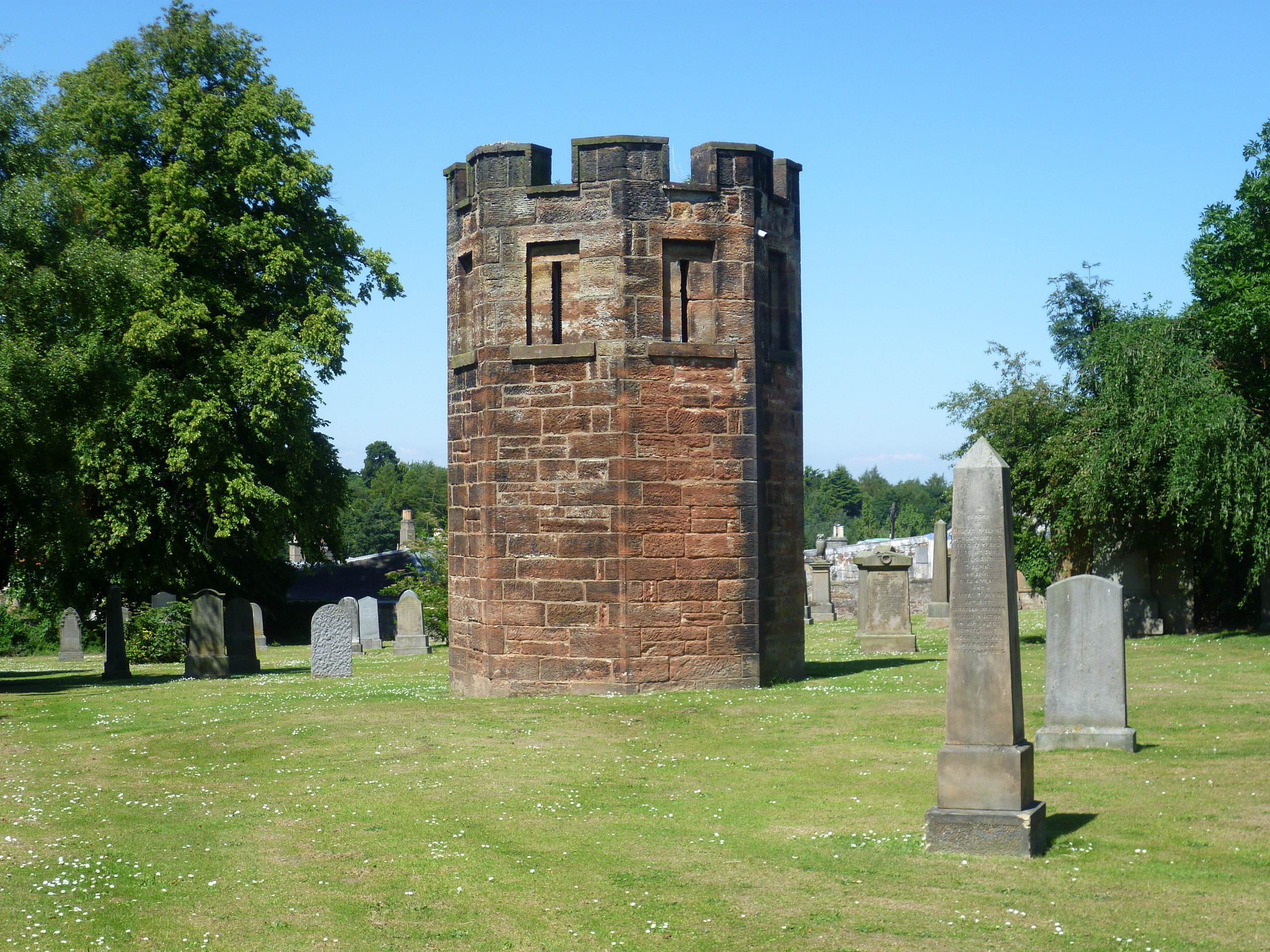
Watchtower within cemetery

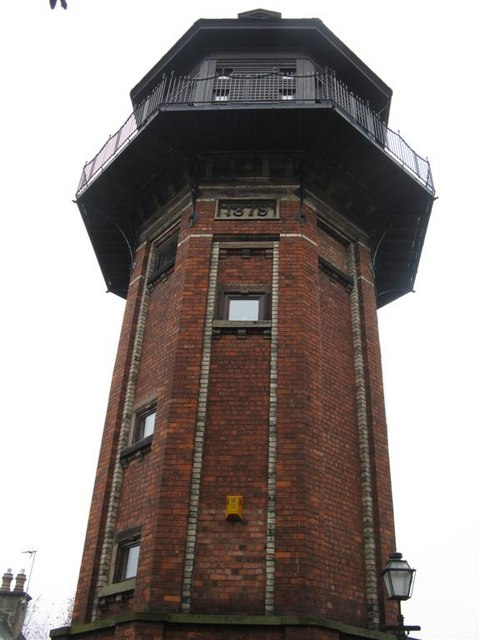
Water tower

== Notable people ==
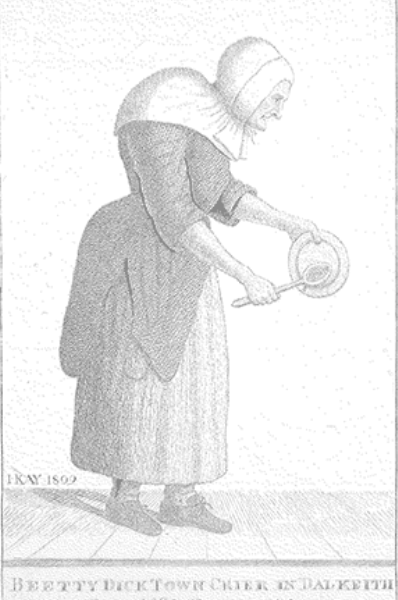
Beetty Dick, town crier of Dalkeith

- Robert Aitken (1734–1802), Bible publisher
- Thomas Alison (1860–1931), painter
- Sir John Anderson (later 1st Viscount Waverley) (1882–1958), Home Secretary 1939–1940, Chancellor of the Exchequer 1943–1945
- Brooke Combe, soul singer
- Edmund Thornton Crawford (1806–1885), artist
- Beetty Dick (1693–1773) one of a series of female town criers peculiar to Dalkeith
- Henry Dundas, 1st Viscount Melville (1742–1811), politician
- Fish (born Derek Dick) (b. 1958), former singer with Marillion
- Darren Fletcher (b. 1984), footballer with Manchester United, West Bromwich Albion and Stoke City
- John Kay (1742–1826), artist
- Robert Ker (1824–1879), First Auditor General of the Province of British Columbia
- Robert Macpherson (1814–1872), photographer
- David Mushet (1772–1847), pioneer of iron production
- Bob Pringle (1851–1902), professional golfer
- Henry Scott, 3rd Duke of Buccleuch (1746–1812), Scottish nobleman
- Walter Montagu Douglas Scott, 5th Duke of Buccleuch (1806–1884), nobleman, landowner and politician
- James Small (1740–1793), inventor
- Bobby Smith (1953–2010), footballer with Hibernian and Leicester City
- Robert Smith (1722–1777), American architect
- James Stagg (1900–1975), D-Day meteorologist
- Peter Guthrie Tait (1831–1901), mathematical physicist
- Aiden Moffat (1996–), racing driver
- Ryan Porteous (1999–), footballer with Hibernian and Watford
- Jacob Fearnley (2001–), Tennis Player

== Twin town ==
Dalkeith is twinned with:

- Jarnac, Charente, France.

== See also ==
- Dalkeith High School
- St. David's R.C. High School
- Edinburgh and Dalkeith Railway
- Whitehill, Midlothian
- List of listed buildings in Dalkeith, Midlothian
