= Jedburgh (disambiguation) =

Jedburgh may refer to:

- Jedburgh, a town and former royal burgh in the Scottish Borders and the traditional county town of the historic county of Roxburghshire
- Jedburgh (Parliament of Scotland constituency), pre-1707
- Jedburgh and District (ward)
- Jedburgh Grammar School
- Jedburgh Town Hall
- Jedburgh Library
- Jedburgh railway station
- The Kelso and Jedburgh railway branch lines
- Jedburgh television relay station
- Munro's of Jedburgh
- Jedburgh, Saskatchewan, Canada.
- Jedburgh Abbey
- Jedburgh Castle
- Jedforest, also known as Jedburgh Forest
- Operation Jedburgh
- Marquessate of Lothian, whose Subsidiary titles include Lord Jedburgh
- Darius Jedburgh, a major character from the 1985 TV Mini-series Edge of Darkness and the 2010 film adaptation.
