= Port House =

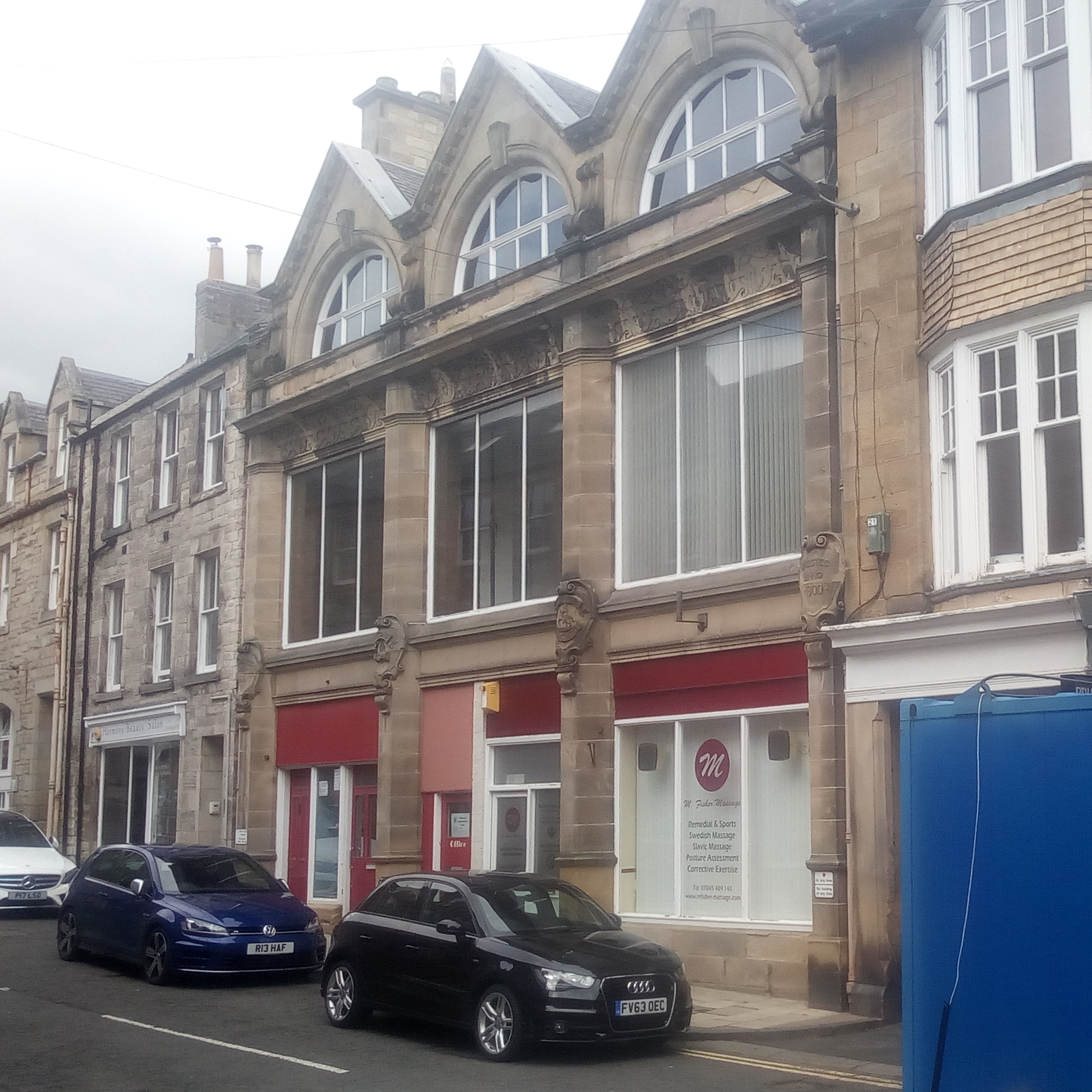
- 11 Exchange - note the windows
- Interactive map of the Port House area

General information
- Classification

Listed Building – Category A
- Designated: 23 March 1993
- Reference no.: LB35522
- Location: 11, Exchange Street, Jedburgh, Scotland
- Coordinates: 55°28′41″N 2°33′21″W

Design and construction
- Architect: James Pearson Alison

The Port House is a Scottish class A listed building in the centre of Jedburgh. The Jedburgh Co-operative Store Company had been founded in 1866 and it operated from the Port House in Exchange Street. In 1900 the Co-op's new building was built with novel architecture including a cast iron frame and large windows. In 2011 it was in a dangerous condition but it has since been refurbished.

== History ==
The current building was designed by Scottish architect James Alison for the Jedburgh Co-operative Store Company. It was a novel design with a metal frame, curtain walls and large windows. The local co-op had been in operation since 1866 and in 1877 it was operating at "The Port House" organised by 223 members.

Allison had also designed Jedburgh Town Hall. The town needed a public building as the Corn Exchange which was close to Port House had burnt down in 1898.

The building in the historic center of Jedburgh was completed in 1900 for the Jedburgh Co-operative Store Company. Planned with a three-storey warehouse with loading doors at the rear. It is thought that the building at the rear may have been a mill powered by the nearby stream.

== Description ==
The 8,000 square foot, two-story "Neo -Renaissance" has three bays in the cream-colored sandstone facade. Business premises are set up on the ground floor, while flat window elements are embedded on the upper floor. Workers would have been sewing and making shoes and the large windows were intended to give them the light to work.

Four columns divide the facade into three bays. Each of the bays has an inscription which read from left to right, "ESTABLISHED ANNO 1866", "STRENU ET PROSPERE" and "ERECTED ANNO 1900".

The Port House became a class A listed building on 23 March 1993.

The building has been used as a residential and commercial building and it has housed a bakery. In 2010 it was the home to a local company of electrical contractors when it was bought for £150,000 by Jedburgh Community Trust using funding from the Borders council, Historic Environment Scotland and private sources. In 2011 the building was included in the "Register of Dangerous Listed Buildings" in Scotland. In 2013, this condition was re-classified as good and at low risk.

An £80,000 grant allowed the building to be renovated and in 2020 a £100,000 loan was arranged to permit building work to be completed.

== See also ==
- List of listed buildings in Jedburgh, Scottish Borders
