= James Alison (architect) =

Scottish artist

- Born: 22 June 1862; Dalkeith
- Died: 19 November 1932 (aged 70); Dalkeith
- Education: Royal Scottish Academy, University of Edinburgh, Heriot-Watt College
- Occupation: Architect
- Known for: architectural appearance of late Victorian Hawick and Jedburgh
- Spouse: Mary Blair

James Pearson Alison (1862–1932) was a Scottish architect, principally practising in Roxburghshire with offices in Hawick.

== Life ==
Alison was born in Dalkeith, Midlothian on 22 June 1862, son of the Thomas Alison, draper and his wife, Margaret Pearson. His father lived at Rosehill in Eskbank, a neighbourhood of Dalkeith, in which town he had a draper's store along with another similar store in nearby Musselburgh. His father held a number of positions at various times in Dalkeith, including member of the Board of Trustees, which governed the town until the adoption of the General Police Act in 1878 and, later, Chief Magistrate (under that Act) of Dalkeith and then Provost of Dalkeith 1881–1884. He was also Returning Officer, Town Clerk and Justice of the Peace.

His elder brother, Thomas Alison was a painter, principally known for Landscape painting, who also produced portraits and other works. Another brother, John Pearson Alison, was a farmer at D'Arcy, Midlothian.

He went to school in Dalkeith and then continued his education in Edinburgh. He attended the Edinburgh Institution from 1876 to 1878. Like his brother, he studied at The Royal Scottish Academy of Art and Architecture, but also at University of Edinburgh (in Architecture) and Heriot-Watt College (for Sanitation) as an architectural student. While a student at Edinburgh he started work for the architect Robert Thornton Shiells as an articled draughtsman, although he continued to live at the family home in nearby Dalkeith.

Before leaving Dalkeith, where he had influential connections, he was commissioned to design the new Burgh Chambers in 1882. This was his first commission. The first meeting of the Burgh Commissioners in the new municipal buildings was held on 9 October 1882, with his father, Chief Executive and provost of Dalkeith 1881–1884, presiding.

He moved to Paisley, Renfrewshire in 1886 to work for the architect Charles Davidson. Then in 1888 he moved to Hawick, where he opened his own practice. He gained a good reputation with local manufacturers and landowners after some early commissions and more work swiftly followed. In 1892 he married Mary Blair of Paisley, where he had previously lived.

=== In Hawick ===
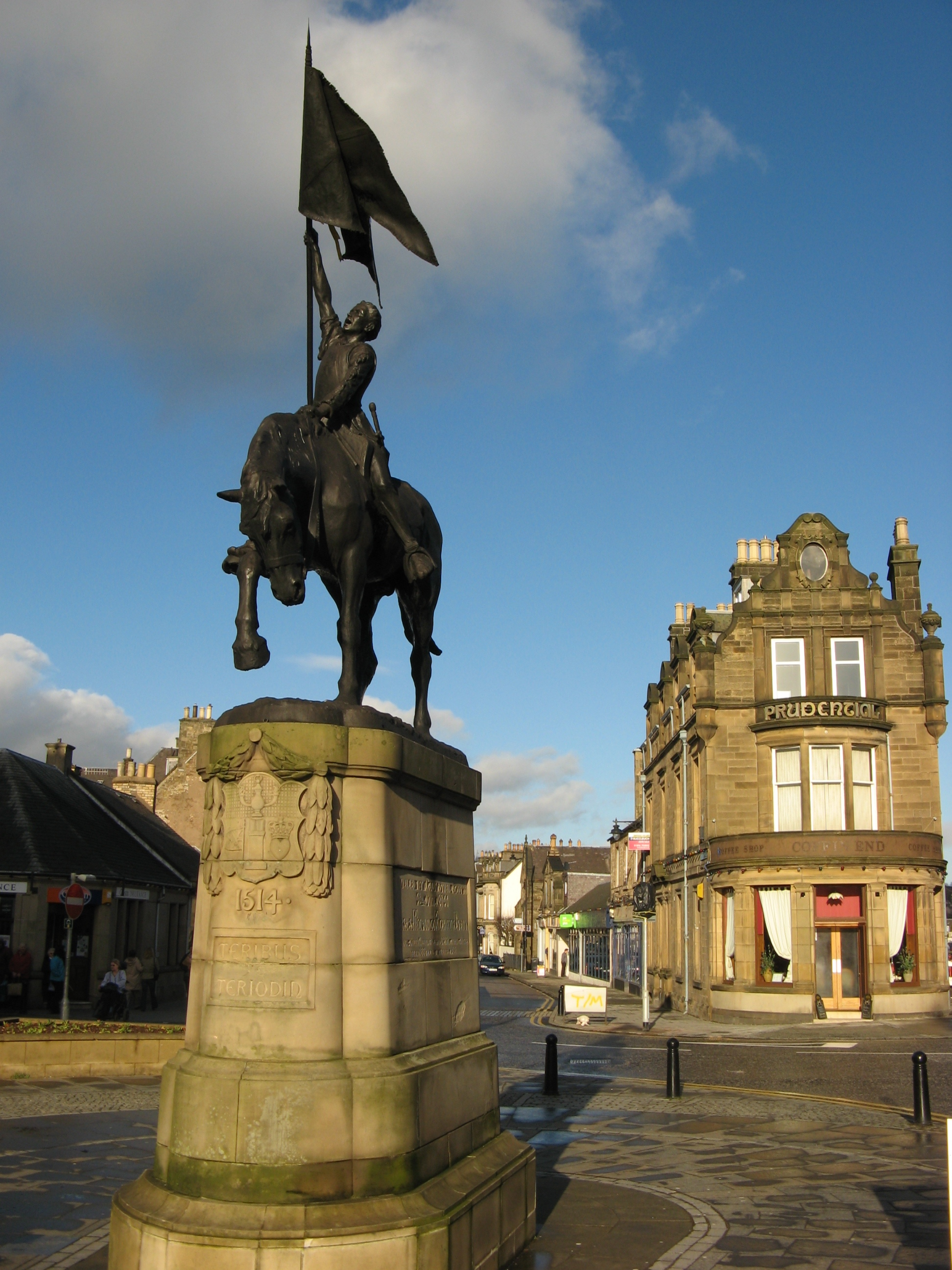
Former Central Hotel, Hawick Shown behind the "Hawick Horse" statue in the town centre

In Hawick he was very prolific and designed with high quality and great versatility. He designed in various styles, including Palladian, Gothic, Mock Tudor, Art Nouveau and Dutch styles. He often had Dutch style gables. Overall, he added significantly to the appearance of the Hawick of his time. One of Alison's early successes (1894) is the former Central Hotel (1 North Bridge St). It terminates the eastward view along the High Street. An elegant balustrade above the big bay incorporated letters spelling “The Central Hotel”. The hotel closed in 1919 and the lettering was changed to ”Prudential”, who had offices there until the mid-1950s. Opposite the Central Hotel in the High Street, the Liberal Club was completed by him in the same year. He also designed the nearby Conservative Club (1895).

=== In Jedburgh ===
In Jedburgh he designed a number of significant buildings including Jedburgh Town Hall and the Port House. The Port House became a class A listed building on 23 March 1993 and it has been refurbished to preserve its novel construction.

=== First World War ===
Up to the First World War his practice flourished, but work was depressed during the war.

After the war, he was commissioned to design several War Memorials. The war memorial of Denholm (hear Hawick) was unveiled on 21 November 1920. He also designed the Dalkeith war memorial, unveiled 28 June 1921, where his brother Thomas had been Provost until the year before. He became a Fellow of Royal Institute of British Architects on 2 December 1907. He was a member of the Hawick Archaeological Society and the Hawick Gallants Club. As a keen antiquarian, he was Fellow of the Society of Antiquaries of Scotland.

From the early 1920s he went into partnership with George Hobkirk under the name “J P Alison & Hobkirk”.

=== Death and legacy ===
He died in Hawick on 19 November 1932. His firm continued in Hawick until 1959, firstly under George Hobkirk and latterly under Joseph Aitken. The firm remained in Hawick until after 1985 and eventually moved to Galashiels.
