= Thomas Alison (painter) =

Scottish artist

- Born: 11 October 1860; Dalkeith
- Died: 26 August 1931 (aged 70); Dalkeith
- Education: Royal Scottish Academy
- Occupation: Painter
- Known for: Landscape painting, also portraits

Thomas Alison (1860–1931) was a Scottish painter whose main period of activity was 1880–1914. Principally known for landscape painting, he also produced portraits and other works. He lived in Dalkeith, Midlothian, and also worked in Spain.

== Family ==
Thomas Alison was born in Dalkeith on 11 October 1860, eldest son of the Thomas Alison, draper and his wife, Margaret Pearson. His father lived at Rosehill in Eskbank, a neighbourhood of Dalkeith, in which town he had a draper's store along with another similar store in nearby Musselburgh. His father held a number of positions at various times in Dalkeith, including member of the Board of Trustees, which governed the town until the adoption of the General Police Act in 1878 and, later, Chief Magistrate (under that Act) of Dalkeith and then Provost of Dalkeith 1881–1884. He was also Returning Officer, Town Clerk and Justice of the Peace.

His brother, James Pearson Alison was an architect, principally practising in Roxburghshire with offices in Hawick. Another brother, John Pearson Alison, was a farmer at D'Arcy, Midlothian.

== Painting ==
He trained as painter at the Royal Scottish Academy (RSA) in Edinburgh, where he exhibited landscape paintings of Cousland (Midlothian) and St Mary's Loch (Selkirkshire) in 1881 and 1882; also a portrait of his father entitled Thomas Alison, Esq., Chief Magistrate of Dalkeith.

He won two silver medals in 1881, for exhibits at the RSA, and in 1882 won a gold prize in a national competition of the works of schools of Art for an oil figure painted from an antique,

He was a member of the Life School in the RSA (where fine art was taught until the school moved to the newly formed of Edinburgh College of Art in 1907), winning a prize for the second best Painting from Life, in 1881.

After training as a painter, Thomas Alison pursued this as his occupation. As well as the RSA, he exhibited at the Society of Scottish Artists (SSA), the Fine Art Exhibition in the Albert Institute, Dundee, amongst others. Among his works that were exhibited were Crichton Castle, A Red Deer Calf among the Rushes, A Sketching Club and In Rothesay Bay. By 1895 he was charging 8 guineas (£8 8s) for some works. He gained a high reputation as a portrait painter, his commissions including a portrait of Thomas Sturrock, Town Clerk of Dalkeith, hung in the Municipal Buildings, Dalkeith, and a portrait of the Earl of Stair.

== Later life ==
He continued to live in the family home at Rosehill and participated in local life. He was Secretary of the Buccleuch Street Literary Society and Treasurer of the Industrial Department of the Dalkeith Horticultural and Industrial Society. He was a member of the Town Council of Dalkeith from 1904 to 1920, being continuously elected every three years. This culminated in his election as Provost of Dalkeith 1918 to 1920. He also served for a number of years as a member of the Parish Council of the civil parish of Dalkeith.

He died at Rosehill, Dalkeith on 26 August 1931 (aged 70) and is buried at Dalkeith.
