= John Daykins =

Scottish recipient of the Victoria Cross

John Brunton Daykins
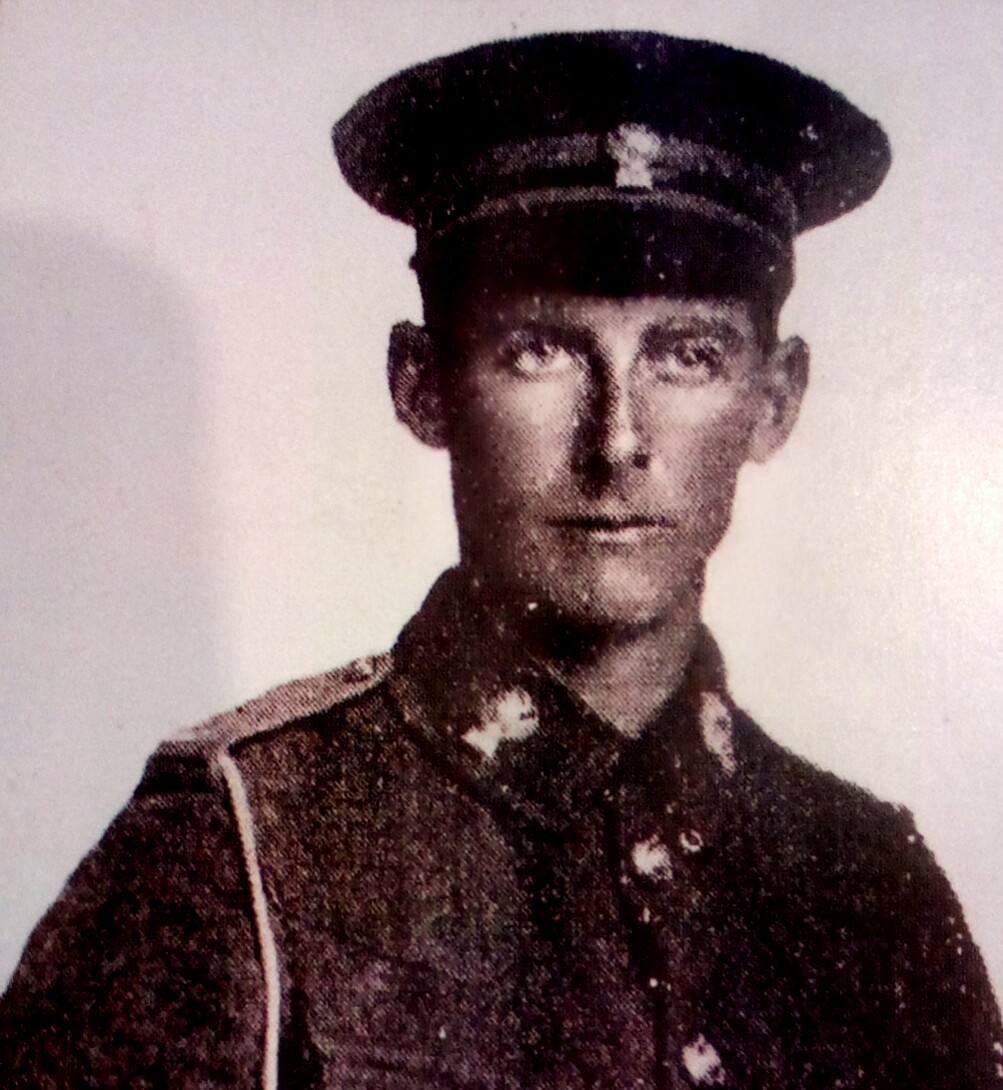
- Sgt. John Brunton Daykins V.C.
- Born: 26 March 1883; Hawick, Scottish Borders
- Died: 24 January 1933 (aged 49); Edinburgh, Scotland
- Burial place: Castlewood Cemetery, Jedburgh
- Military career
- Allegiance: United Kingdom
- Branch: British Army
- Service years: 1914–1918
- Rank: Sergeant
- Units: Lothians and Border Horse; The York and Lancaster Regiment
- Conflicts: World War I
- Awards: Victoria Cross; Military Medal

John Brunton Daykins VC MM (Ormiston Farm, Hawick, 26 March 1883 – 24 January 1933, Edinburgh) was a Scottish recipient of the Victoria Cross, the highest and most prestigious award for gallantry in the face of the enemy that can be awarded to British and Commonwealth forces.

== Life ==
Daykins was born in Hawick in 1883 to John and Bessie Daykins, but he moved with his family to Jedburgh when he was a child.

In 1914 he enlisted with the Lothians and Border Horse and he was at Loos, the Battle of Vimy Ridge and the battle of Ypres. After this he was discharged after suffering from Trench fever.

He refused to be labelled as "unfit" and on the third attempt he successfully re-enlisted again in the York and Lancaster Regiment and served in Battle of Passchendaele and again on Vimy Ridge. He was in the 2/4th Battalion at Solesmes, Nord in France on 30 October 1918 with a dozen of his platoon.

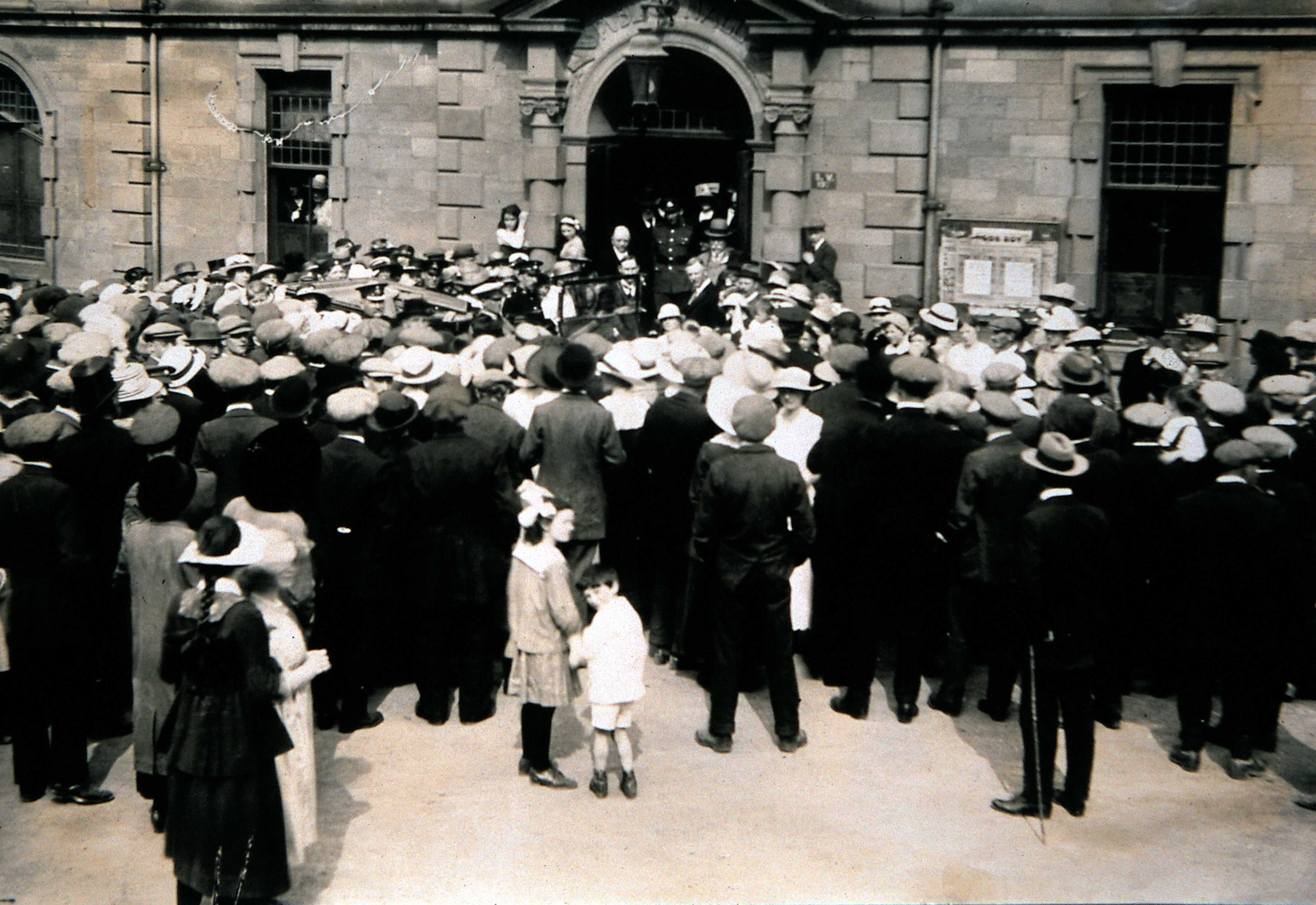
John Daykins VC welcomed at Jedburgh Town Hall

They rushed a machine-gun and during subsequent severe hand-to-hand fighting Daykins disposed of many of the enemy and secured his objective. He then located another machine-gun which was holding up an operation of his company. Under heavy fire he worked his way alone to the post and shortly afterwards returned with 25 prisoners and an enemy machine-gun, which he mounted at his post. His magnificent fighting spirit and example inspired his men, saved many casualties and contributed largely to the success of the attack.

When he returned to Jedburgh he was made a burgess. In 1924 he inherited his family's Howden farm when his father died.

== Death and legacy ==
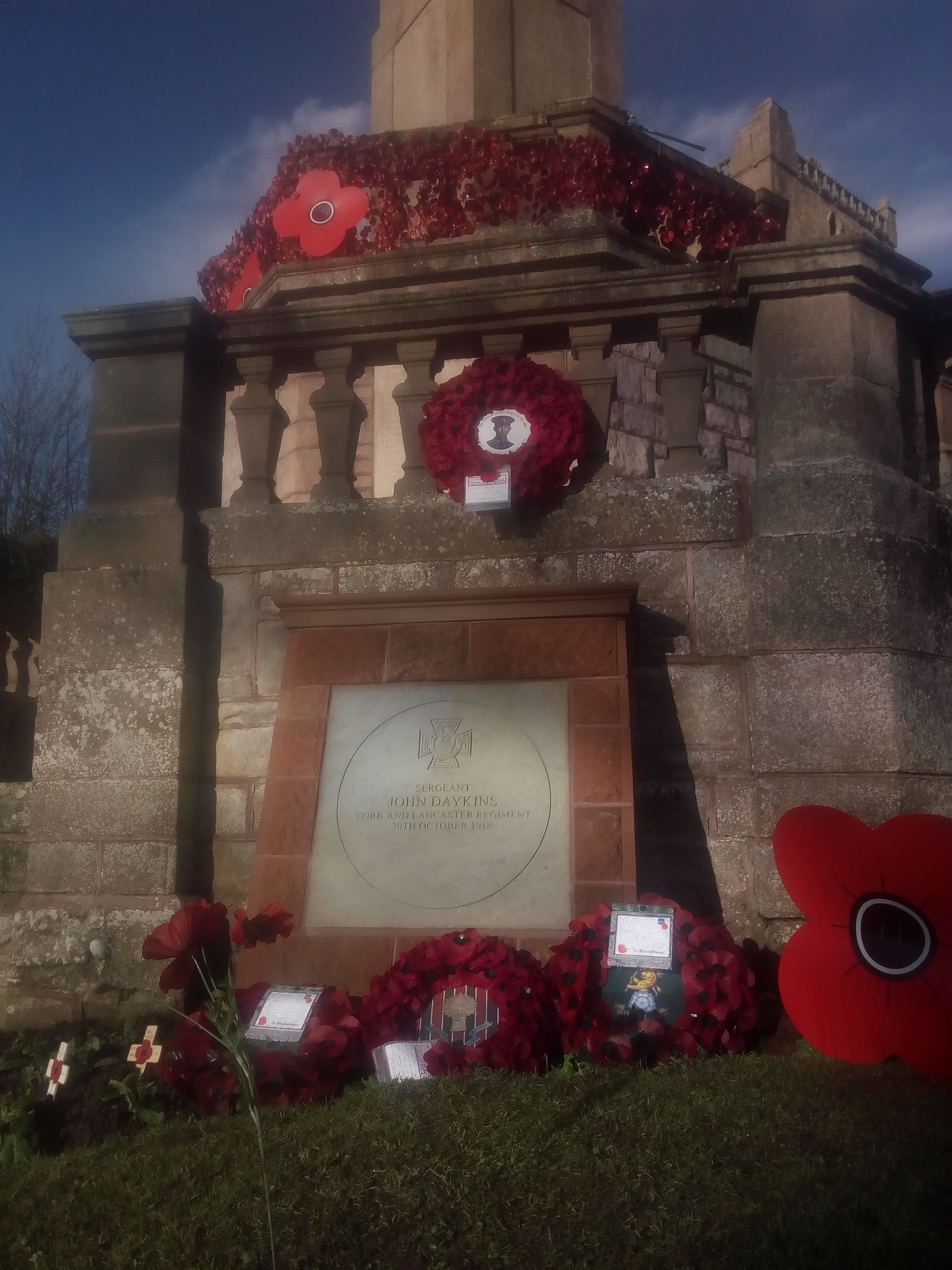
His memorial was decorated for the 100th celebration for the end of WWI in 2018

Daykins died in 1933 after an accident with a shotgun. He was unmarried and his medals went to his sister. Elizabeth Daykins gave his medals to the York and Lancaster Regimental Museum which is within Clifton Park Museum, in Rotherham,.There is a street in Hawick named for him and Jedburgh decided to lay a commemorative paving stone in 2018. A commemorative event was scheduled to take place in his adopted town of Jedburgh and at Solesmes, Nord where he earned is VC on the centenary of his bravery.
