= List of listed buildings in Jedburgh, Scottish Borders =

This is a list of listed buildings in the parish of Jedburgh in the Scottish Borders, Scotland.

== List ==
Name	Location	Date listed	Grid ref. (Note: Sometimes known as OSGB36, the grid reference (where provided) is based on the British national grid reference system used by the Ordnance Survey. • "Guide to National Grid". Ordnance Survey. • "Get-a-map". Ordnance Survey.)	Geo-coordinates	Notes	LB number (Note: Historic Environment Scotland assign a unique alphanumeric identifier to each designated site in Scotland, for listed buildings this always begins with "LB", for example "LB12345".)	Image
1 High Street	High Street	1993		55°28′40″N 2°33′18″W	Category C(S)	35541	Upload another image
5-7 (Odd Nos) High Street	High Street	1993		55°28′40″N 2°33′18″W	Category C(S)	35543	Upload another image
19 High Street	High Street	1993		55°28′41″N 2°33′17″W	Category B	35548	Upload another image
49 High Street And 1 Smith's Wynd	High Street	1993		55°28′44″N 2°33′12″W	Category C(S)	35557	Upload another image
20 High Street, Spread Eagle Hotel, With Stables To Rear	High Street	1971		55°28′42″N 2°33′17″W	with stables to rear	35565	Upload another image See more images
24 High Street	High Street			55°28′43″N 2°33′16″W	Category B	35567	Upload another image
32-34 (Even Nos) High Street	High Street			55°28′44″N 2°33′15″W	Category B	35570	Upload another image
36 High Street	High Street			55°28′44″N 2°33′14″W	Category B	35571	Upload another image
5-6 Market Place And 4-7 (Inclusive Nos) Burn Wynd	Market Place			55°28′39″N 2°33′21″W	Category B	35576	Upload another image
Jedburgh Old Parish Church	Newcastle Road	1993		55°28′29″N 2°33′14″W	Newcastle Road (And Oxnam Road), Old Parish Church With Gatepiers And Boundary Wall, (Church Of Scotland)	35581	Upload another image
1A And 1B Old Bridge End	Bridge End			55°28′40″N 2°33′03″W	Category B	35585	Upload another image
5 Abbey Place, Abbots Lea	Abbey Place			55°28′38″N 2°33′17″W	Category C(S)	35460	Upload another image
6 And 7C Abbey Place	Abbey Place			55°28′38″N 2°33′17″W	Category B	35461	Upload another image
Bridge Street, Bridge House	Bridge Street			55°28′49″N 2°33′06″W	Category C(S)	35466	Upload another image
1 Bridge Street, Maitland House	Bridge Street			55°28′49″N 2°33′08″W	Category C(S)	35468	Upload another image
14A And B And 16 Canongate	Canongate			55°28′40″N 2°33′15″W	Category C(S)	35480	Upload another image
71 Castlegate	Castlegate			55°28′32″N 2°33′29″W	Category C(S)	35492	Upload Photo
83 Castlegate	Castlegate			55°28′31″N 2°33′30″W	Category C(S)	35497	Upload another image
91 Castlegate With Garden Wall To Front	Castlegate			55°28′30″N 2°33′32″W	Category C(S)	35502	Upload another image
Castlegate, Sheriff Court (Old County Buildings) With Front Wall And Railings	Castlegate			55°28′39″N 2°33′20″W	Category A	35503	Upload another image
74 Castlegate	Castlegate			55°28′30″N 2°33′29″W	Category C(S)	35513	Upload Photo
1,2,3 Duck Row	Duck Row			55°28′41″N 2°33′05″W	Category C(S)	35519	Upload another image
11 Exchange Street	Exchange Street	1993		55°28′41″N 2°33′21″W	Category A	35522	Upload another image
Friars, Normanie With Cast-Iron Verandah, Terrace And Steps				55°28′47″N 2°33′23″W	Category C(S)	35526	Upload Photo
Friarsgate, Friars Yard With Boundary Walls, Gatepiers And Railings				55°28′50″N 2°33′15″W	Category C(S)	35531	Upload another image
Edgerston Church With Graveyard, Gatepiers, Graveyard Wall And Railings	Edgerston			55°23′54″N 2°29′58″W	Category B	13355	Upload another image
Ferniehirst Castle With Arched Gateway, Garden Walls And Outbuildings				55°27′16″N 2°33′04″W	Category A	13369	Upload another image See more images
Glenburn Hall Stables				55°28′22″N 2°34′16″W	Category C(S)	13373	Upload another image
Hundalee				55°27′41″N 2°33′37″W	Category B	13375	Upload Photo
Hunthill With Forecourt And Garden Walls, Forecourt Gatepiers And Gates, And Entrance Gatepiers				55°27′52″N 2°31′45″W	Category B	13377	Upload Photo
Jedfoot Lodge With Gates And Boundary Wall				55°30′34″N 2°32′21″W	Category C(S)	13380	Upload another image
Jedwater House, With Stables, Outbuilding, And Retaining Wall				55°28′04″N 2°33′10″W	Category B	13381	Upload Photo
Lintalee And Walled Garden				55°27′23″N 2°33′36″W	Category B	13388	Upload Photo
1-5 (Inclusive Nos) Mossburnford Cottages				55°26′19″N 2°31′43″W	Category C(S)	13390	Upload another image
Newcastle Road, Linthaugh	Newcastle Road			55°27′25″N 2°33′25″W	Category B	13395	Upload Photo
Bonjedward House And Walled Garden				55°29′44″N 2°32′48″W	Category B	8400	Upload another image
1-4 (Inclusive Nos) Easter Ulston Cottages				55°29′26″N 2°31′22″W	Category C(S)	8409	Upload another image See more images
25-27 (Odd Nos) High Street	High Street			55°28′42″N 2°33′15″W	Category C(S)	35550	Upload another image
4-6 (Even Nos) High Street	High Street			55°28′41″N 2°33′19″W	Category C(S)	35559	Upload another image
8 High Street And Grahamslaw Close	High Street			55°28′41″N 2°33′19″W	Category C(S)	35560	Upload another image
18 High Street	High Street			55°28′42″N 2°33′18″W	Category C(S)	35564	Upload another image
7-8 Market Place And 4-7 (Inclusive Nos) Burn Wynd	Market Place			55°28′40″N 2°33′21″W	Category B	35577	Upload another image
Newcastle Road, Allerley Well Park, Gatepiers, Drinking Fountain, Boundary Walls And Marker Stone	Newcastle Road			55°28′24″N 2°33′15″W	Category C(S)	35579	Upload another image
Newcastle Road (And Oxnam Road), Kirkland House, (Former Manse), Coach House And Boundary Wall	Newcastle Road			55°28′27″N 2°33′14″W	Category B	35582	Upload another image
Oxnam Road, Allerley Brae, W Cottage	Oxnam Road			55°28′30″N 2°33′08″W	Category C(S)	35587	Upload another image
1A Smith's Wynd	Smith's Wynd			55°28′44″N 2°33′12″W	Category C(S)	35596	Upload another image
1-3 (Inclusive Nos) Under Nags Head Close And Blackhills Close				55°28′39″N 2°33′23″W	Category C(S)	35599	Upload another image
91 Bongate With Gatepiers, Gates And Railings	Bongate			55°29′02″N 2°32′52″W	Category C(S)	35463	Upload another image
2 Bridge Street	Bridge Street			55°28′49″N 2°33′07″W	Category C(S)	35469	Upload Photo
2 Canongate, Including Jedvale	Canongate			55°28′40″N 2°33′18″W	Category C(S)	35475	Upload another image
Castlegate, Jedburgh Castle Old Jail With Exercise Yard Walls, Fortifications, Portcullis Gates, Entrance Gates And Outer Embankment Wall	Castlegate			55°28′27″N 2°33′32″W	Category A	35482	Upload another image See more images
1 And 2 Castlegate	Castlegate			55°28′39″N 2°33′21″W	Category B	35483	Upload another image
15 Castlegate, Carnegie Library	Castlegate			55°28′38″N 2°33′22″W	Category B	35486	Upload another image
89 Castlegate With Garden Walls	Castlegate			55°28′30″N 2°33′31″W	Category C(S)	35501	Upload another image
18 - 20 (Even Nos) Castlegate	Castlegate			55°28′37″N 2°33′22″W	Category C(S)	35506	Upload another image
46 Castlegate	Castlegate			55°28′34″N 2°33′25″W	Category B	35509	Upload another image
48 Castlegate	Castlegate			55°28′34″N 2°33′25″W	Category C(S)	35510	Upload another image
15 Exchange Street	Exchange Street			55°28′41″N 2°33′22″W	Category C(S)	35524	Upload another image
Edgerston Estate, Stotfield Steading	Edgerston			55°24′10″N 2°29′05″W	Category C(S)	13356	Upload Photo
Edgerston House Walled Garden Incorporating Summerhouse, Fountain With Cascase Beyond, Two Attached Outbuildings And Two Detached Summerhouses	Edgerston			55°23′42″N 2°29′20″W	Category B	13364	Upload Photo
Ferniehurst Castle Visitor Centre (Former Chapel)				55°27′17″N 2°33′03″W	Category A	13370	Upload another image
Glenburn Hall With Walled Garden, Outbuildings, Gatepiers And Railings				55°28′23″N 2°34′05″W	Category A	13371	Upload Photo
Hundalee Cottage With Gates And Gatepiers				55°27′37″N 2°33′47″W	Category C(S)	13376	Upload another image
Jedfoot Cottage With Boundary Wall				55°30′33″N 2°32′24″W	Category C(S)	13379	Upload another image
Kersheugh				55°26′44″N 2°32′31″W	Category C(S)	f13382	Upload Photo
Lanton Tower With Service Wing, Stables, Boundary And_Garden Walls				55°29′09″N 2°36′22″W	Category B	13387	Upload another image
Mount Ulston With Gatepiers And Boundary Wall, Carriage House/Stable Range, Walled Garden And Summerhouses				55°29′53″N 2°32′00″W	Category B	13393	Upload Photo
Overton Tower				55°24′31″N 2°29′58″W	Category B	13398	Upload another image
1-6 (Inclusive Nos) Timpendean Farm Cottages				55°30′03″N 2°35′09″W	Category C(S)	13400	Upload Photo
Bonjedward House, Stable, Garage, Cottages And Barn				55°29′42″N 2°32′51″W	Category C(S)	8402	Upload another image
3 High Street	High Street			55°28′40″N 2°33′18″W	Category C(S)	35542	Upload another image
9 High Street	High Street			55°28′41″N 2°33′17″W	Category C(S)	35544	Upload another image
21-23 (Odd Nos) High Street	High Street			55°28′42″N 2°33′16″W	Category C(S)	35549	Upload another image
29-31 (Odd Nos) High Street	High Street			55°28′42″N 2°33′15″W	Category C(S)	35551	Upload another image
45-47 (Odd Nos) High Street	High Street			55°28′44″N 2°33′12″W	Category C(S)	35556	Upload another image
2 High Street, 1 Exchange Street And 12 Market Place	High Street			55°28′40″N 2°33′19″W	Category C(S)	35558	Upload Photo
16 High Street	High Street			55°28′42″N 2°33′18″W	Category C(S)	35563	Upload another image
26 High Street	High Street			55°28′43″N 2°33′16″W	Category B	35568	Upload another image
Newcastle Road, Inchbonny And Garages	Newcastle Road			55°28′12″N 2°33′12″W	Category C(S)	35580	Upload Photo
Queen Street, Queen Mary's House With Outbuildings, Boundary Wall And Railings	Queen Street			55°28′43″N 2°33′10″W	Category A	35591	Upload another image See more images
1-10 (Inclusive Nos) Queen Street, Queen Mary's Buildings	Queen Street			55°28′44″N 2°33′09″W	Category C(S)	35592	Upload another image
19 Queen Street	Queen Street			55°28′48″N 2°33′08″W	Category C(S)	35593	Upload another image
Sharplaw Road, Birkhill With Associated Outbuildings, Including Hayloft And Coach House, And Boundary Walls	Sharplaw Road			55°29′03″N 2°33′07″W	Category C(S)	35594	Upload another image
1 And 3 Abbey Bridge End With Boundary Walls	Abbey Bridge End			55°28′33″N 2°33′15″W	Category B	35453	Upload another image
7-11 (Odd Nos) Castlegate (Prince Charlie's House), 1-7 (Odd Nos) Blackhills Close And 1-2 Upper Nags Head Close	Castlegate			55°28′39″N 2°33′22″W	Category B	35485	Upload another image
27 Castlegate	Castlegate			55°28′38″N 2°33′23″W	Category C(S)	35488	Upload Photo
59 And 61 Castlegate	Castlegate			55°28′34″N 2°33′27″W	Category C(S)	35491	Upload another image
81 Castlegate	Castlegate			55°28′31″N 2°33′30″W	Category C(S)	35496	Upload Photo
Castlegate, Police Station	Castlegate			55°28′38″N 2°33′21″W	Category C(S)	35504	Upload another image
24-26 (Even Nos And 24A) Castlegate And 1 Abbey Close	Castlegate			55°28′37″N 2°33′22″W	Category B	35507	Upload another image
30 Castlegate	Castlegate			55°28′36″N 2°33′23″W	Category B	35508	Upload another image
76 Castlegate	Castlegate			55°28′30″N 2°33′30″W	Category C(S)	35514	Upload another image
High Street Bank Of Scotland With Boundary Wall And Railings	High Street			55°28′46″N 2°33′13″W	Category B	35535	Upload another image
Edgerston House South Lodge	Edgerston			55°23′29″N 2°29′39″W	Category C(S)	13362	Upload Photo
Edgerston Mill Cottage				55°23′29″N 2°29′06″W	Category C(S)	13366	Upload Photo
Hunthill, Stable Court				55°27′57″N 2°31′42″W	Category C(S)	13378	Upload Photo
Lanton, Beeswing Cottage With Gatepiers And Garden Wall				55°29′15″N 2°36′16″W	Category C(S)	13384	Upload another image
Mossburnford House				55°26′24″N 2°31′50″W	Category B	13391	Upload Photo
1-7 (Inclusive Nos) Bonjedward Cottages	Bonjedward			55°30′14″N 2°32′46″W	Category C(S)	8399	Upload another image See more images
Bonjedward House, Lodge	Bonjedward			55°29′51″N 2°32′45″W	Category C(S)	8401	Upload another image
Bonjedward, The Old Smiddy	Bonjedward			55°30′13″N 2°32′43″W	Category C(S)	8405	Upload another image
17 High Street	High Street			55°28′41″N 2°33′17″W	Category C(S)	35547	Upload another image
Market Place, Jubilee Fountain	Market Place			55°28′39″N 2°33′20″W	Category B	35573	Upload another image
Oxnam Road, Allerley Brae, E Cottage	Oxnam Road			55°28′30″N 2°33′08″W	Category C(S)	35586	Upload another image
Oxnam Road, Boundary Bank With Entrance Gate And Coach House	Oxnam Road			55°28′38″N 2°32′59″W	Category C(S)	35588	Upload another image
Waterside, Hartrigge Lodge With Boundary Walls And Gatepiers	Waterside			55°28′44″N 2°33′01″W	Category C(S)	35601	Upload another image See more images
Abbey Close, The Abbey House With Boundary Wall And Railings	Abbey Close			55°28′36″N 2°33′20″W	Category C(S)	35455	Upload Photo
Bongate, Bongate Cottage And Gatepiers	Bongate			55°29′02″N 2°32′51″W	Category B	35462	Upload another image
Bridge Street, Townfoot Bridge	Bridge Street			55°28′50″N 2°33′04″W	Category B	35467	Upload another image
8 Burn Wynd And 4 And 5 Cornelius Close, Canongate Gallery	Burn Wynd			55°28′40″N 2°33′22″W	Category C(S)	35470	Upload Photo
12-14 (Even Nos) Canongate	Canongate			55°28′40″N 2°33′15″W	Category C(S)	35479	Upload Photo
75 Castlegate	Castlegate			55°28′32″N 2°33′30″W	Category C(S)	35494	Upload Photo
89A Castlegate	Castlegate			55°28′31″N 2°33′31″W	Category C(S)	35500	Upload another image
Castlegate, Masonic Hall	Castlegate			55°28′38″N 2°33′21″W	Category C(S)	35505	Upload another image
7-9 (Odd Nos) Exchange Street	Exchange Street			55°28′41″N 2°33′20″W	Category C(S)	35521	Upload Photo
Friarsgate, Friars Glen	Friarsgate			55°28′50″N 2°33′18″W	Category B	35527	Upload Photo
Friarsgate, Friarshall With Coach House Boundary Walls And Gatepiers	Friarsgate			55°28′44″N 2°33′18″W	Category C(S)	35528	Upload another image
Friarsgate, Friars Mount With Gatepiers And Quadrant Walls	Friarsgate			55°28′46″N 2°33′20″W	Category C(S)	35530	Upload Photo
High Street, Jedburgh Grammar School With Primary School Boundary Walls, Railings And Gatepiers	High Street			55°28′49″N 2°33′13″W	Category B	35537	Upload another image
Edgerston, Old Schoolhouse And Boundary Wall	Edgerston			55°23′53″N 2°29′59″W	Category C(S)	13367	Upload Photo
Hartrigge House Stables And Walled Garden				55°29′01″N 2°32′24″W	Category B	13374	Upload another image
Lanton, The Old Manor Inn With Garden Walls				55°29′16″N 2°36′15″W	Category B	13386	Upload another image
Lintalee, Lodge				55°27′24″N 2°33′27″W	Category C(S)	13389	Upload Photo
Newcastle Road, Hundaleebank	Newcastle Road			55°27′57″N 2°33′15″W	Category C(S)	13394	Upload another image
New Mill Farmhouse				55°29′50″N 2°32′38″W	Category B	13396	Upload Photo
Wildcat Gate, Headkeeper's Cottage				55°28′37″N 2°32′04″W	Category B	13401	Upload another image See more images
High Street, K6 Telephone Kiosk At Post Office	High Street			55°28′43″N 2°33′14″W	Category B	35540	Upload another image
11-13 (Odd Nos) High Street	High Street			55°28′41″N 2°33′17″W	Category C(S)	35545	Upload another image
15 High Street	High Street			55°28′41″N 2°33′17″W	Category C(S)	35546	Upload another image
33 High Street	High Street			55°28′42″N 2°33′14″W	Category C(S)	35552	Upload another image
12-14 (Even Nos) High Street	High Street			55°28′41″N 2°33′18″W	Category C(S)	35562	Upload another image
22 High Street	High Street			55°28′43″N 2°33′16″W	Category C(S)	35566	Upload Photo
30 High Street	High Street			55°28′43″N 2°33′15″W	Category C(S)	35569	Upload another image
Old Bongate St Mary's Rc Church, Presbytery, Ancillary Accommodation, Boundary Walls And Gatepiers	Bogate			55°28′55″N 2°33′04″W	Category B	35583	Upload another image
2 Smith's Wynd	Smith;s Wynd			55°28′44″N 2°33′12″W	Category C(S)	35597	Upload another image
Abbey Bridge End, The Rampart, War Memorial With Balustrades, Steps And Walls	Abbey Bridge End			55°28′35″N 2°33′15″W	Category B	35454	Upload another image See more images
Jedburgh Town Hall	Abbey Place			55°28′37″N 2°33′14″W	Category B	35458	Upload another image See more images
Canongate Bridge				55°28′41″N 2°33′04″W	or "Packhorse Bridge"	35471	Upload another image See more images
7 Canongate	Canongate			55°28′39″N 2°33′18″W	Category C(S)	35473	Upload Photo
3-5 (Inclusive Nos) Castlegate (To Under Nags Head Close)	Castlegate			55°28′39″N 2°33′21″W	Category B	35484	Upload another image
57 Castlegate	Castlegate			55°28′34″N 2°33′27″W	Category C(S)	35490	Upload another image
87 Castlegate	Castlegate			55°28′31″N 2°33′31″W	Category C(S)	35499	Upload another image
72 Castlegate	Castlegate			55°28′30″N 2°33′29″W	Category C(S)	35512	Upload Photo
Crown Lane, Crown Lane House With Boundary Wall And Railings	Crown Lane			55°28′41″N 2°33′16″W	Category B	35516	Upload another image
Duck Row, The Piper's House	Duck Row			55°28′40″N 2°33′06″W	Category B	35518	Upload another image
Galahill, The Hermitage With Gatepiers And Boundary Walls				55°28′28″N 2°33′29″W	Category C(S)	35534	Upload another image
Edgerston Farmhouse And Implement Shed				55°23′44″N 2°29′41″W	Category C(S)	13357	Upload Photo
Edgerston House, Bridge	Edgerston			55°24′07″N 2°29′18″W	Category B	13361	Upload Photo
Langlee				55°27′02″N 2°33′37″W	Category B	13383	Upload Photo
Mossburnford House Stables, Outbuildings And Walled Gardens				55°26′26″N 2°31′46″W	Category B	13392	Upload Photo
Bonjedward, Telephone Kiosk	Bonjedward			55°30′13″N 2°32′44″W	Category B	8406	Upload another image
Camphouse (Former Coaching Inn) With Stables To Rear				55°24′36″N 2°30′28″W	Category B	8407	Upload Photo
Dolphinston With Outbuildings, Boundary Wall And Gatepiers				55°25′41″N 2°30′09″W	Category B	8408	Upload Photo
High Street, Trinity Manse With Gatepiers And Boundary Wall	High Street			55°28′47″N 2°33′12″W	Category C(S)	35539	Upload Photo
41-43 (Odd Nos) High Street	High Street			55°28′43″N 2°33′13″W	Category C(S)	35555	Upload another image
9 Market Place And 2 Burn Wynd	Market place			55°28′40″N 2°33′21″W	Category B	35578	Upload another image
55 Bongate, Balmanno House	Bongate			55°29′00″N 2°32′59″W	Category C(S)	35584	Upload another image
1 And 2 Veitch's Close And 1 And I Fairbairns's Close (Rear Of Foresters Arms)	Castlegate (behind)			55°28′38″N 2°33′23″W	Category C(S)	35600	Upload another image
Abbey Place, Newgate With Attached Wall, External Stair And Railings	Abbey PLace			55°28′38″N 2°33′19″W	Category A	35457	Upload another image
4 Boundaries	Boundaries			55°28′39″N 2°33′01″W	Category B	35464	Upload another image
5 Boundaries, Boundary Villa With Wall And Railings	Boundaries			55°28′38″N 2°33′02″W	Category C(S)	35465	Upload another image
6 Canongate	Canogate			55°28′40″N 2°33′17″W	Category C(S)	35477	Upload another image
73A And B Castlegate	Castlegate			55°28′32″N 2°33′29″W	Category C(S)	35493	Upload Photo
3-5 (Odd Nos) Exchange Street	Exchange Street			55°28′40″N 2°33′20″W	Category A	35520	Upload another image
13 Exchange Street	Exchange Street			55°28′41″N 2°33′22″W	Category C(S)	35523	Upload another image
Friars, Froylehurst With Conservatory				55°28′45″N 2°33′24″W	Category B	35525	Upload another image
Friarsgate, Friars House	Friarsgate			55°28′48″N 2°33′17″W	Category C(S)	35529	Upload Photo
Friarsgate, Glenfriars Hotel With Boundary Wall And Gatepiers	Friarsgate			55°28′52″N 2°33′18″W	Category C(S)	35533	Upload another image
High Street, British Legion Hall (Former Boston Church) With Boundary Walls, Piers And Railings	High Street			55°28′45″N 2°33′10″W	Category B	35536	Upload another image
Edgerston House Stable Court And Cottage				55°23′46″N 2°29′21″W	Category C(S)	13363	Upload Photo
Lanton Placecottage				55°29′13″N 2°36′18″W	Category C(S)	13385	Upload another image
Newcastle Road (A68), Inchbonny Bridge	Newcastle Road			55°28′06″N 2°33′17″W	Category B	13446	Upload another image See more images
Bonjedward Mill, Farm Steading	Bonjedward			55°29′58″N 2°32′32″W	Category B	8404	Upload another image
former Trinity Church (Formerly Blackfriars With Church Offices, Gates Gatepiers, Railings And Boundary Wall	High Street			55°28′48″N 2°33′12″W	Category B	35538	Upload another image
35 High Street	High Street			55°28′43″N 2°33′14″W	Category C(S)	35553	Upload another image
39 High Street	High Street			55°28′43″N 2°33′13″W	Category C(S)	35554	Upload Photo
10 High Street And Grahamslaw Close Warehouse	High Street			55°28′41″N 2°33′19″W	Category C(S)	35561	Upload another image
1 Market Place (And Abbey Place)	Market Place			55°28′39″N 2°33′18″W	Category C(S)	35575	Upload another image
Pleasance, St John's Episcopal Church With Lych Gate And Boundary Wall	The Pleasance			55°28′52″N 2°33′15″W	Category A	35589	Upload another image
2 Abbey Place	Abbey Place			55°28′39″N 2°33′18″W	Category C(S)	35459	Upload Photo
1-5 (Odd Nos) Canongate (Includes The Mercat Cafe)	Canongate			55°28′39″N 2°33′18″W	Category C(S)	35472	Upload Photo
Castlegate And Galahill, Castlewood Cemetery With Steps, Gates, Gatepiers And Surrounding Wall	Castlegate			55°28′25″N 2°33′35″W	Category C(S)	35481	Upload another image
Castlegate, The Foresters Arms	Castlegate			55°28′38″N 2°33′23″W	Category C(S)	35487	Upload another image
Castlegate, Glenbank Hotel With Boundary Walls And Gatepiers	Castlegate			55°28′35″N 2°33′28″W	Category B	35489	Upload another image
Castlegate, Lynwell And Castle Dene	Castlegate			55°28′29″N 2°33′30″W	Category C(S)	35515	Upload another image
Crown Lane, Orwell Cottage And Dentist With Flat Above	Crown Lane			55°28′42″N 2°33′15″W	Category C(S)	35517	Upload another image
Edgerston, Former Manse With Barn And Ice House	Edgerston			55°24′00″N 2°30′03″W	Category B	13358	Upload Photo
Edgerston War Memorial And Enclosure Wall	Edgerston			55°23′53″N 2°29′56″W	Category B	13368	Upload Photo
New Mill Farm, Mill And Ruined Outbuildings				55°29′49″N 2°32′39″W	Category B	13397	Upload Photo
Richards Cleuch, Bridge No 780				55°25′14″N 2°29′49″W	Category C(S)	13399	Upload Photo
38 High Street (Royal Bank Of Scotland)	High Street			55°28′45″N 2°33′14″W	Category C(S)	35572	Upload another image
Market Place, K6 Telephone Kiosk At Newgate	Market Place			55°28′39″N 2°33′20″W	Category B	35574	Upload another image
Pleasance, St John's Church Centre	High Street			55°28′54″N 2°33′15″W	Category B	35590	Upload another image
Sharplaw Road, Brae House With Forestairs And Railings, Gatepiers And Boundary Wall				55°28′53″N 2°33′17″W	Category B	35595	Upload Photo
Station Road, Station Bridge	Station Road			55°29′08″N 2°32′43″W	Category B	35598	Upload another image
Abbey Close, The Nest With Coach House, Boundary And Garden Walls And Railings	Abbey Close			55°28′35″N 2°33′21″W	Category B	35456	Upload Photo
21 Canongate, Royal Hotel	Canongate			55°28′39″N 2°33′15″W	Category C(S)	35474	Upload another image
4 Canongate	Canongate			55°28′40″N 2°33′17″W	Category C(S)	35476	Upload another image
10 Canongate (Former Black Bull Inn)	Canongate			55°28′40″N 2°33′17″W	Category C(S)	35478	Upload another image
77 Castlegate	Castlegate			55°28′32″N 2°33′30″W	Category C(S)	35495	Upload another image
85 Castlegate	Castlegate			55°28′31″N 2°33′30″W	Category C(S)	35498	Upload another image
50 Castlegate	Castlegate			55°28′34″N 2°33′26″W	Category C(S)	35511	Upload another image
Friarsgate, Glenarvan (Formerly Norland) With Coach House	Friarsgate			55°28′48″N 2°33′23″W	Category C(S)	35532	Upload Photo
Edgerston Home Farm, Dovecot	Edgerston			55°23′43″N 2°29′41″W	Category B	13359	Upload Photo
Edgerston House With Gatepiers, Terraces And Wall Garden, Birdpool, And Entrance Gates	Edgerston			55°23′49″N 2°29′25″W	Category A	13360	Upload Photo
Edgerston Mill	Edgerston			55°23′30″N 2°29′09″W	Category B	13365	Upload Photo
Glenburn Hall Lodge, Entrance Gates, Gatepiers And Quadrant Walls				55°28′19″N 2°33′55″W	Category C(S)	13372	Upload another image
Newcastle Road (A68), Ferniehurst Bridge	Newcastle Road			55°27′29″N 2°33′31″W	Category B	13445	Upload another image See more images
Bonjedward, Jedneuk With Garden Walls	Bonjedward			55°30′11″N 2°32′39″W	Category C(S)	8403	Upload Photo

== Key ==
The scheme for classifying buildings in Scotland is:

- Category A: "buildings of national or international importance, either architectural or historic; or fine, little-altered examples of some particular period, style or building type."
- Category B: "buildings of regional or more than local importance; or major examples of some particular period, style or building type, which may have been altered."
- Category C: "buildings of local importance; lesser examples of any period, style, or building type, as originally constructed or moderately altered; and simple traditional buildings which group well with other listed buildings."

In March 2016 there were 47,288 listed buildings in Scotland. Of these, 8% were Category A, and 50% were Category B, with the remaining 42% being Category C.
