= Jedburgh Town Hall =

Municipal building in Jedburgh, Scotland

Jedburgh Public Hall
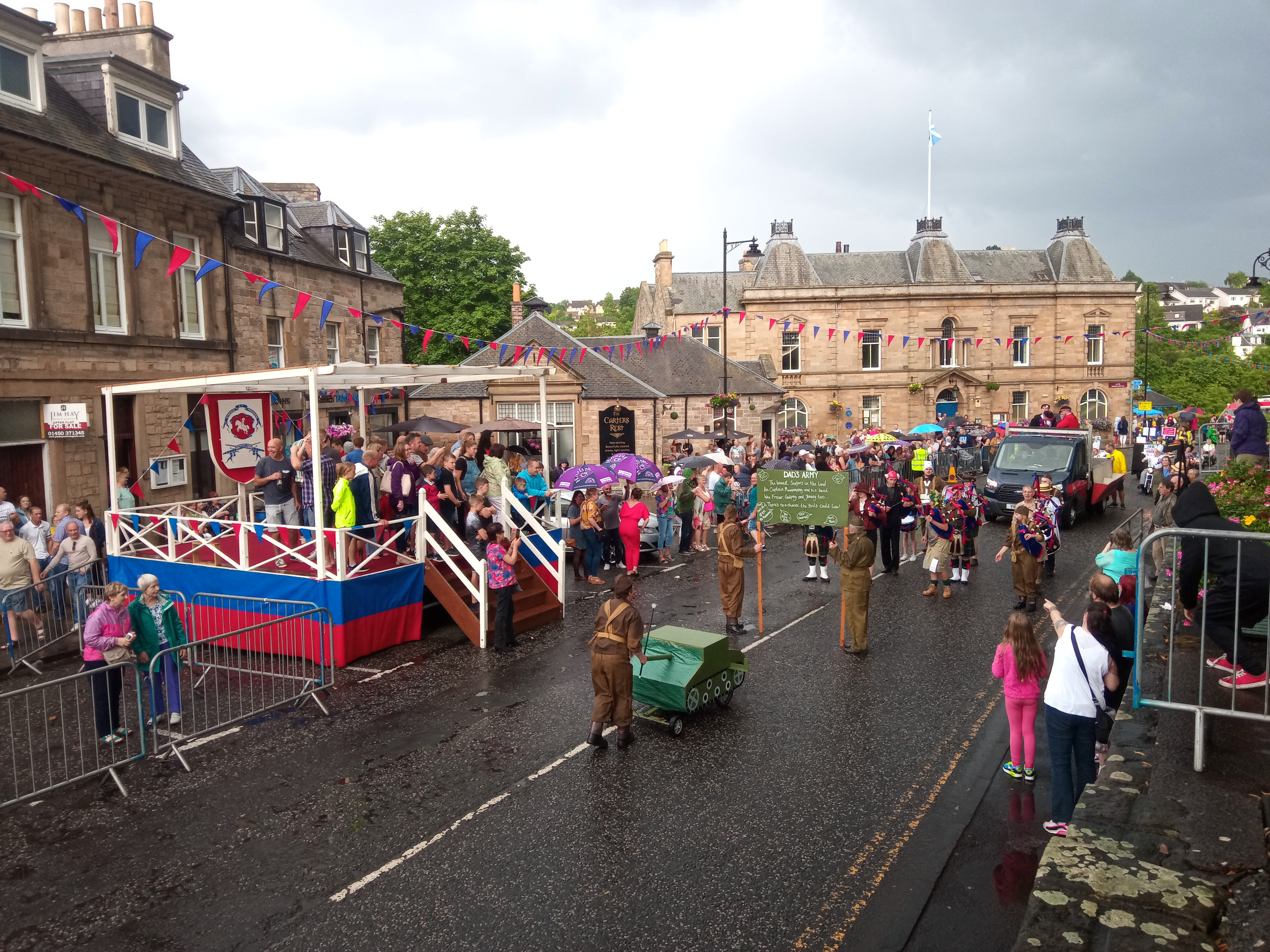
- The hall and the town's Pipe band, dressed as Dad's Army, during Jedburgh's festival Friday in 2019
- Interactive map of the Jedburgh Public Hall area

General information
- Architectural style: said to be "later Renaissance period" adaption
- Classification

Listed Building – Category B
- Designated: 23 March 1993
- Reference no.: LB35458
- Location: Abbey Place, Jedburgh, Scotland
- Coordinates: 55°28′37″N 2°33′14″W
- Construction started: 1900
- Completed: 1900
- Cost: £5,000

Design and construction
- Architect: James Pearson Alison
- Engineer: James Mabon and Son (builders)

Jedburgh Public Hall known as Jedburgh Town Hall is a listed building in the centre of Jedburgh opposite the ruins of Jedburgh Abbey. It was opened in 1900 as the town's principal public building. It overlooks a large car park which is beside the A68.

== History ==
The current building dates from 1900 and it was designed by James Pearson Alison. This was the same year as Jedburgh Library was opened. It was built on the foundations of a previous building and basement rooms are from that former use as a malt barn. These rooms had been used as the town armoury. The town needed a public building as the Corn Exchange, which had stood in the market place, burnt down in 1898.

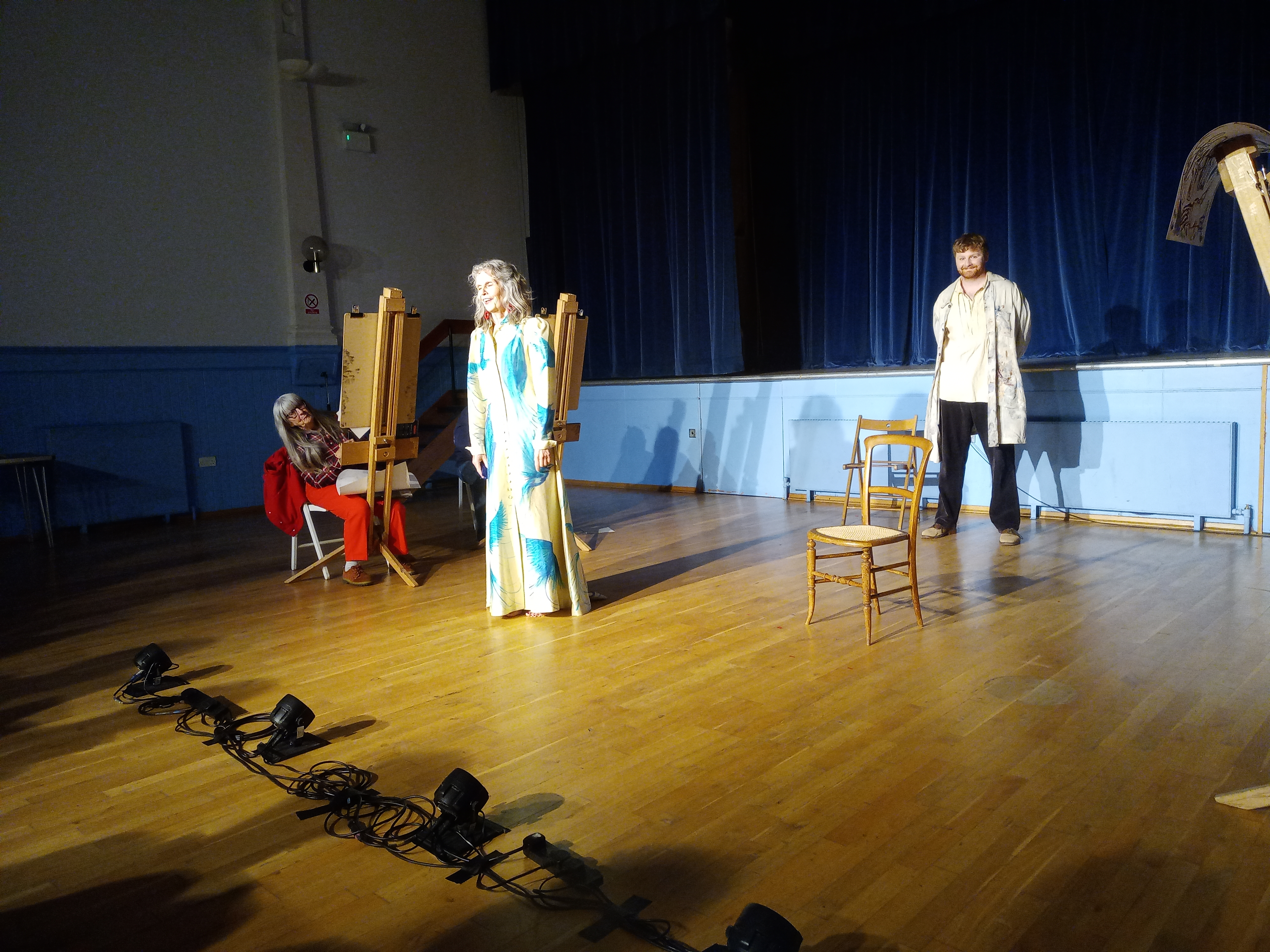
Life - theatre production at the Town Hall in May 2025

The new public building was used as a drill hall during the first world war. The hall was used by "C" Squadron of the Lothians and Border Horse and for "A" Company of the 4th battalion of the King's Own Scottish Borderers. In 1918 it was a scene of celebration when war hero John Daykins VC was honoured at the hall.

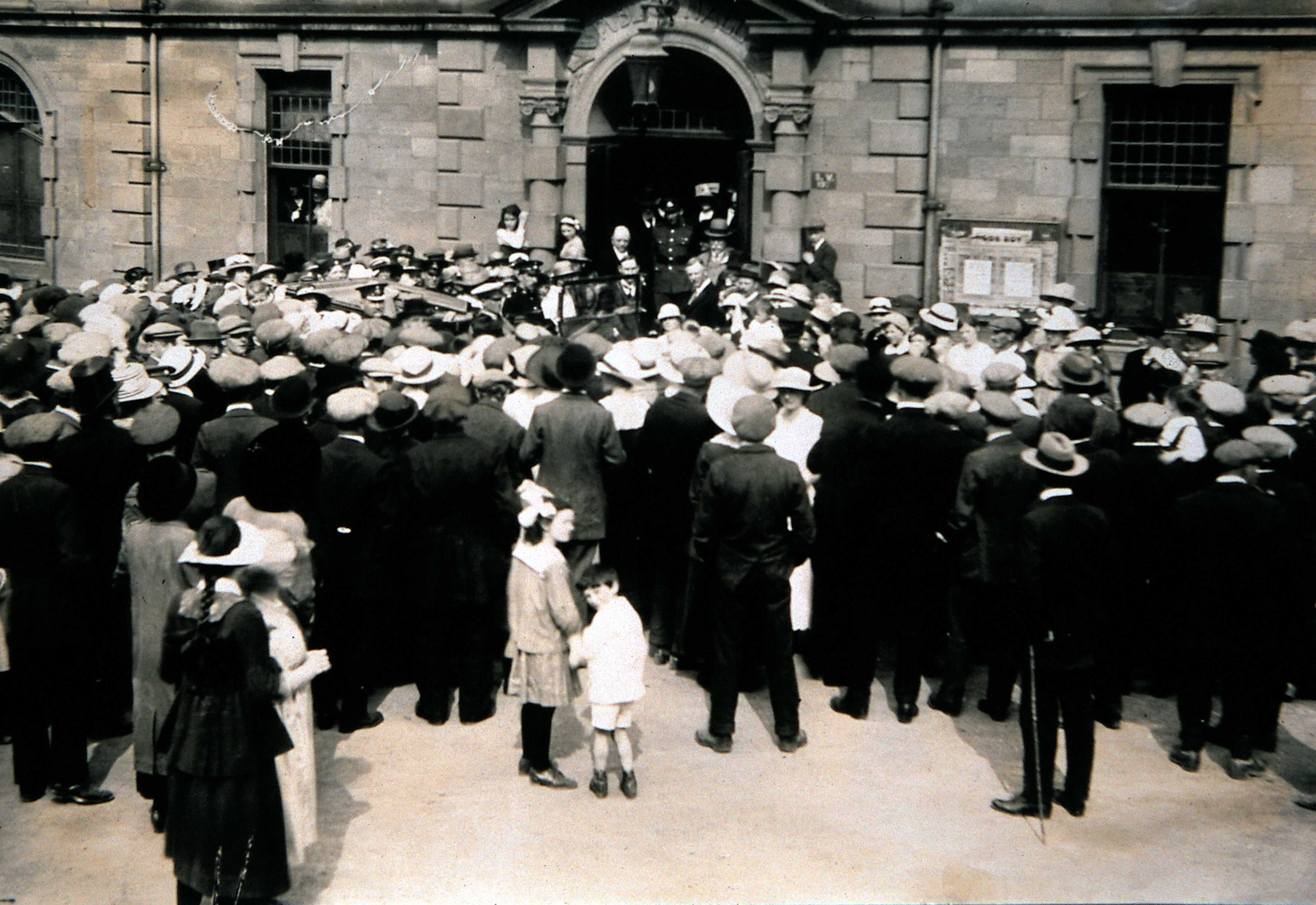
John Daykins VC welcomed at the hall in 1918

The novelist, playwright and creator of Peter Pan, J. M. Barrie, visited the town hall when he became a freeman of the town on 15 October 1928.

It was at the town hall that, in a by-election in March 1965, the future leader of the Liberal Democrats, David Steel, was declared elected, aged just 25, as the youngest Member of Parliament in the UK House of Commons.

In 1975 an information centre was attached and the hall became a class B listed building on 23 March 1993.

The hall was run and owned by the local council but in 2015 the costs of ownership became onerous and it and the management of many other public buildings in the borders were transferred to a trust. The building was available to let and it was the location for the local flower show, birl'n'beer and music evenings.

In early 2020 it was proposed that the hall might be sold, but a petition caused the council to pause the proposed closures. Then, in September 2020, the council reported that it was considering proposals, submitted by a community group known as "Jedburgh Legacy Group", to take over the management of some of Jedburgh's historic buildings.

== Facilities ==
The hall has four different levels. In the basement there is a smaller hall, stores and a kitchen, while on the ground floor there is the main hall, foyer, stage and a changing room. The first floor has a meeting room and access to the balcony and on the second floor there are three more rooms. All the levels have toilets.

== See also ==
- List of listed buildings in Jedburgh, Scottish Borders
