= D'Arcy, Midlothian =

Coordinates: 55.8714°N 3.0248°W

D'Arcy
- Location within Midlothian
- OS grid reference: NT359647
- Council area: Midlothian
- Lieutenancy area: Midlothian
- Country: Scotland
- Sovereign state: United Kingdom
- Post town: DALKEITH
- Postcode district: EH22
- Dialling code: 0131
- Police: Scotland
- Fire: Scottish
- Ambulance: Scottish
- UK Parliament: Midlothian
- Scottish Parliament: Midlothian North and Musselburgh

D'Arcy is a hamlet in Midlothian, Scotland, located just south of Dalkeith near Edinburgh. It is ¼ mile east of Mayfield and lies within the Civil Parish of Newbattle and the area of Mayfield and Easthouses Community council.

The settlement includes D’Arcy House, a traditional Victorian stone farmhouse, a coach house, farm cottages and, nearby the kiln cottages. D’Arcy Wood, to the east, was the site of a Limestone Quarry. Although now private residences, D’Arcy House, coach house and farm cottages formed part of the D’Arcy farmstead complex, which dates from the 18th or 19th century and was previously larger in extent.

D’Arcy House, coach house and farm cottages each have a Historic Environment Scotland record and a Midlothian Council Historic Environment Record (HER). The HER is used by the council for historic environment conservation and for advice for planning proposals.

The name D’Arcy comes from Lady Caroline D'Arcy the wife of William Kerr, 4th Marquess of Lothian (married 1735), whose name was given to the estate, both the farmstead and the hillside above the old village of Easthouses. The Marquess of Lothian was based at Newbattle Abbey in the parish of Newbattle and, at least in 19th century, owned three-quarters of the land in the parish, including D’Arcy. Their policies (estates) took their names from personal names in the Kerr family of the Marquess of Lothian. The name D’Arcy appears on the map of the three Lothians by Andrew Armstrong, dated 1773, next to Mayfield and Westhouses, on the South Centre section.

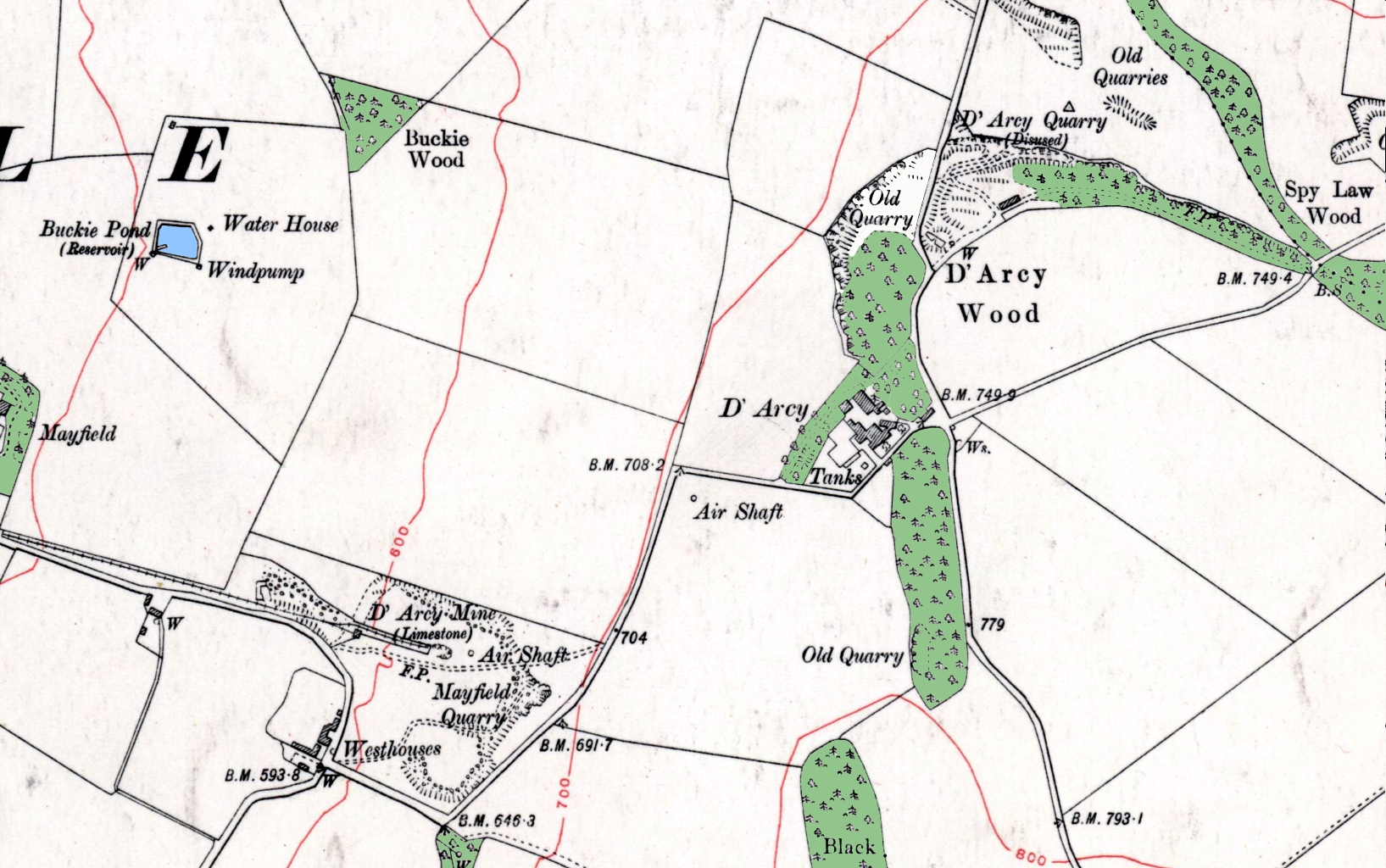
Map of D’Arcy 1913

At the disused quarry near D'Arcy farmstead, there appears an outcrop of Limestone, where the strata dips towards the River South Esk. There was extensive opencast quarrying at D'Arcy quarry, both north and south of D'Arcy farmstead. The geological sections have an upper layer 12 – 20 ft. thick of impure limestone, overlying a dark calcareous shale band 4 ft. thick, itself overlying massive crystalline limestone. This lowest layer was mined for limestone, which was burnt at kiln houses for lime.

Trial drilling for petroleum oil in D’Arcy began in 1919, at a point near the crest of the Cousland Anticline, but this was eventually abandoned as the amount obtained was insufficient. However, in 1937, further exploratory drilling took place at a point very close to the 1919 well. This produced 5 barrels per day and the oil well, named Midlothian No 1, continued operation until 1965. 30,654 barrels of oil were produced in the period 1937–1965. The Oil bore was 200 yards to east of Darcy hamlet.
