= Jedburgh Library =

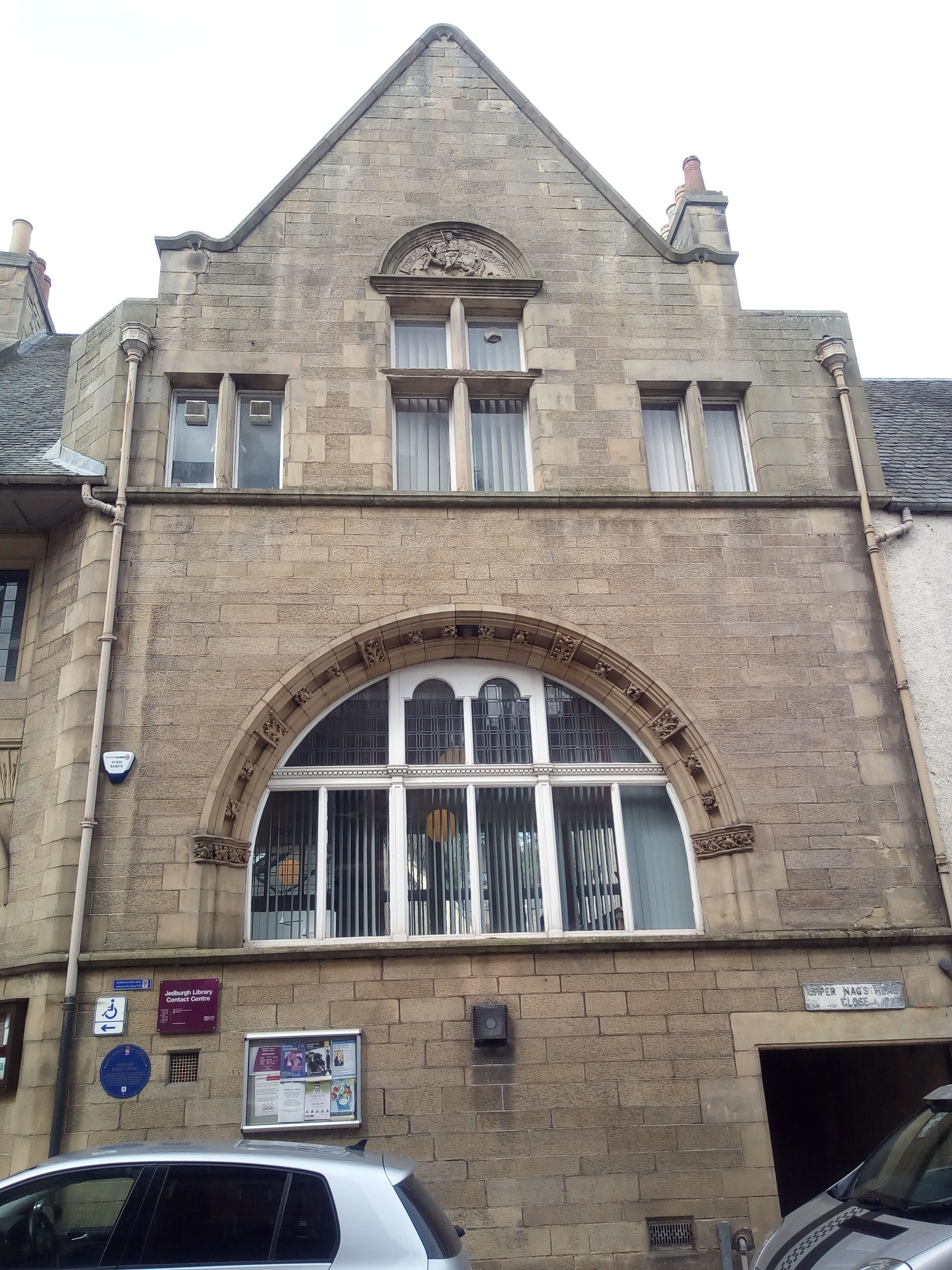
- the library front

General information
- Location: 15 Castlegate, Jedburgh, Scotland
- Coordinates: 55°28′38″N 2°33′22″W
- Completed: 1900
- Cost: £1,700
- Client: Andrew Carnegie

Design and construction
- Architect: George Washington Browne
- Designations: listed Cat B

Jedburgh Library was last housed in the second building built for Andrew Carnegie in Jedburgh at a cost of £1,700. It was one of the many libraries built by Carnegie. There have been subscription libraries in the town since at least 1780 and at one time there were three or four. This library had been open since the start of the 20th century but plans in 2020 were revealed to close it and replace it with a corner set aside at the school.

== History ==
First mention of the possibility of a library in Jedburgh dates from 1714 when Thomas Rutherfurd set aside money and a number of books which he presented to the burgh as a basis for a library. Rutherford paid for a room to be built above the school at Laighkirkyard and he had his family's arms displayed above the door. The library was managed by the parish school master James Brewster. Alexander Jeffrey estimated in his 1857 history of the area that the library had started "about eighty years ago". Jeffrey records that the library's 1,500 books were sold off in 1856 at knock down prices. He blamed the management of the library who he felt had failed to engage with the public after 1835. Shares in libraries in Jedburgh carried value. In 1838 a local draper, John Robison, went bankrupt. His share in "Jedburgh Library" was mentioned in the newspaper and London Gazette advert for the auction.

Another library known as Waugh's library existed for sixty years up until 1837 when the books which covered a wide variety of subjects were divided amongst the library's subscribers.

Members of Blackfriars church (later Trinity Church in High Street) could also gain access to the church's books.

The current library dates back to a religious library that was set up in the town. The title of "Jedburgh Library" came about after a dispute over whether non-religious books should be included.

In 1841 Jedburgh's Mechanics Institute founded a library.

It was reported that Jedburgh had two subscription libraries in the 1700s and a third opened in 1800. This matched nearby Kelso which also had three and Hawick had two, although most towns only had one. Pigott's 1837 directory list's four libraries in Jedburgh. The first was "Easton Walter?" which was a circulating library in Abbey place. Miss Armstrong ran a library at the Old Gaol and at Old Bridge End there were two libraries, the "New Library" and "Jedburgh Library" operated by Thomas Carr and George Balfour respectively.

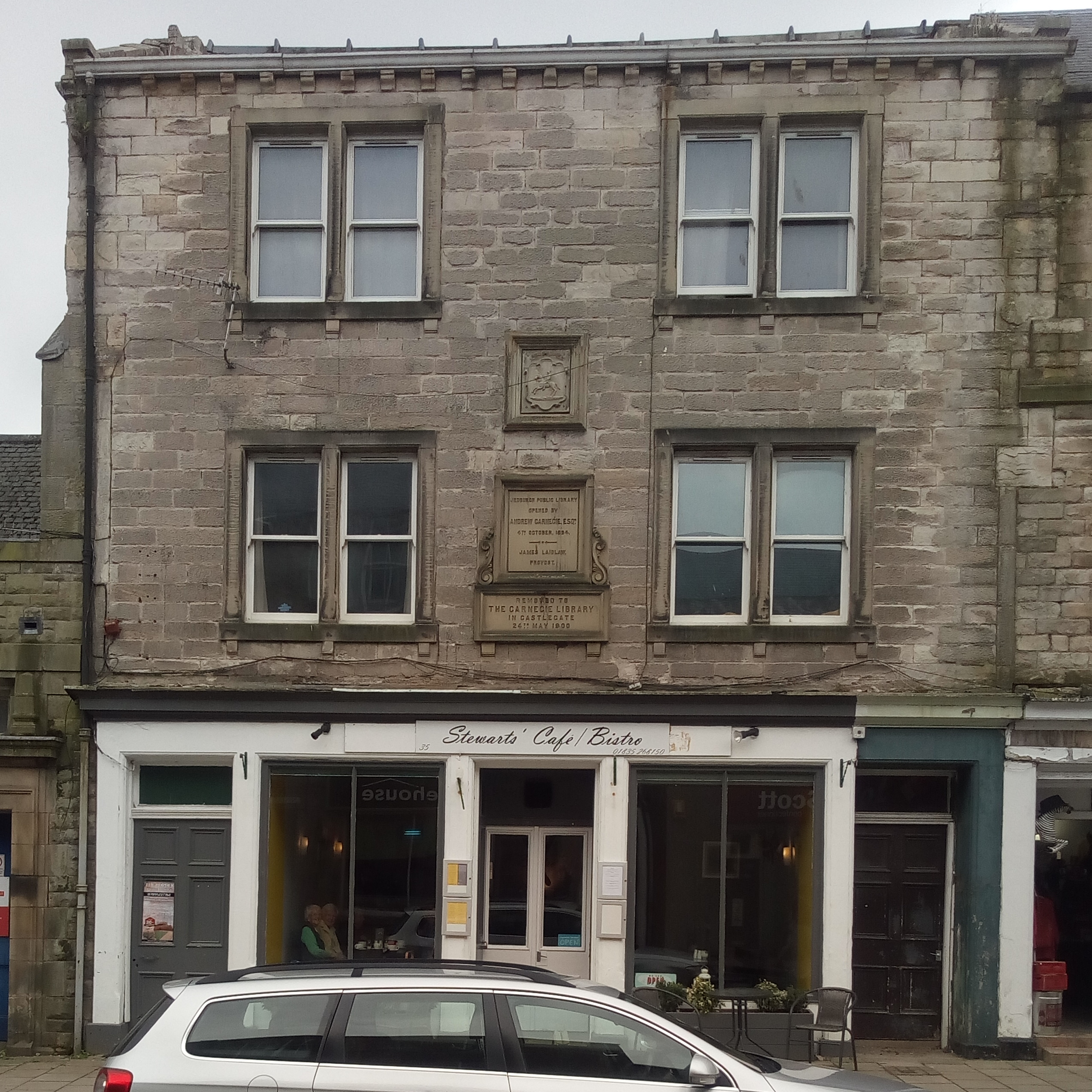
The first Carnegie Library still has a plaque in the High Street

The library in 2026

On 4 October 1894 Andrew Carnegie in Jedburgh gave a speech about the new library which he had funded in the town's High Street. This library however proved inadequate and a new library was constructed on Castlegate where the Nag's Head Inn had stood. The new "Carnegie Library" was fronted by the town's arms and above the porch was the message "Let There be Light". The building was designed by Sir George Washington Browne and it formally opened on 24 May 1900 with Andrew Carnegie once more in attendance. It was designed to hold 12,000 books and 59 readers and rooms were set aside above for meetings and a museum. The building is now listed at Category B.

== Move to Jedburgh Grammar Campus campus ==
In 2019 it was announced by the Scottish Borders Council that it was planned to close the Carnegie Library and move the facility to within the new "Jedburgh Grammar Campus" campus (sic). A petition was organised by library users to resist the move.
