= Loanhead railway station =

Disused railway station in Loanhead, Midlothian

Loanhead

General information
- Location: Lothian, Midlothian; Scotland
- Coordinates: 55.8791°N 3.146°W
- Grid reference: NT284657
- Platforms: 1

Other information
- Status: Disused

History
- Original company: Edinburgh, Loanhead and Roslin Railway
- Pre-grouping: Edinburgh, Loanhead and Roslin Railway
- Post-grouping: London and North Eastern Railway

Key dates
- 23 July 1874: Opened
- 1 May 1933: Closed to passengers
- 22 July 1968: Closed to goods
Location

Loanhead railway station served the town of Loanhead, Midlothian, Scotland, from 1874 to 1968 on the Edinburgh, Loanhead and Roslin Railway.

== History ==
The station was opened on 23 July 1874 by the Edinburgh, Loanhead and Roslin Railway. It was situated on the north side of Station Road. On the up side was the goods yard which had three sidings, the first and second serving a loading dock and the third serving a wooden goods shed. Access to this yard was controlled by a signal box, which was on the down side. To the north were further sidings which served Mactaggart Scott's engineering works. Even though it was the busiest station on the line, the station closed to passengers with the rest on 1 May 1933 but remained open for goods traffic. Passenger excursions continued in later years until 4 June 1960, the last excursion being a Sunday school outing. The station building was demolished in 1961. The station, as well as the goods yard, closed to goods 22 July 1968, although a private siding remained in use. The rest of the sidings and the track was later lifted. The yard was purchased by Mactaggart Scott and used as a storage facility. The private siding was finally lifted in 1996.

Preceding station	Disused railways	Following station
Gilmerton; Line and station closed	Edinburgh, Loanhead and Roslin Railway	Roslin; Line and station closed
