= Rosslyn Castle railway station =

Disused railway station in Roslin, Midlothian

Rosslyn Castle
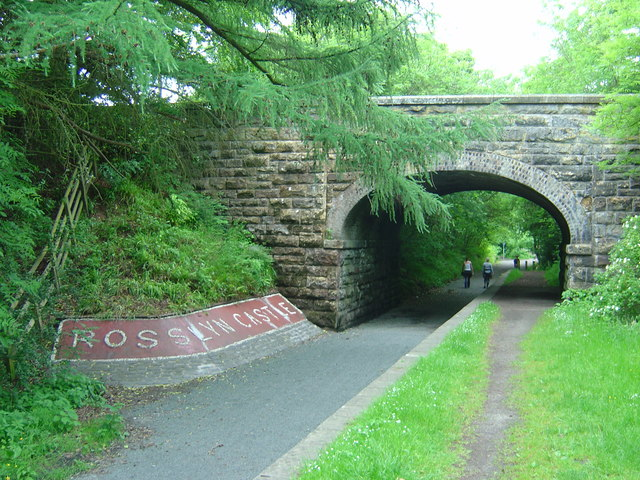
- The site of the station in 2008

General information
- Location: Roslin, Midlothian; Scotland
- Coordinates: 55.8477°N 3.1647°W
- Grid reference: NT271622
- Platforms: 1

Other information
- Status: Disused

History
- Original company: Penicuik Railway
- Pre-grouping: North British Railway
- Post-grouping: LNER; British Railways (Scottish Region)

Key dates
- 2 September 1872: Opened
- 16 February 1874: Name changed to Rosslyn Castle
- 10 September 1951: Closed to passengers
- 3 August 1959: Closed completely
Location

Rosslyn Castle railway station served the village of Roslin, Midlothian, Scotland from 1872 to 1959 on the Penicuik Railway.

== History ==
The station opened as Rosslyn on 2 September 1872 by the Penicuik Railway. It was situated on both sides of an unnamed minor road. The platform ran under the road bridge with two-thirds of the platform on the east side and the other third on the west side. The station's name was changed to Rosslyn Castle on 16 February 1874. This name was set in small stones as an ornamental feature. The goods yard was on the west side of the road bridge. It had three sidings, two being short and one serving a loading dock. The third siding was longer and ran parallel with the line for 300 yards to a transhipment point. The station closed to passengers on 10 September 1951 but remained open to goods traffic. By 1958 two of the sidings had been lifted, leaving only the loading dock siding in use. The station closed completely on 3 August 1959.

Preceding station	Disused railways	Following station
Rosewell and Hawthornden	North British Railway; Penicuik Railway	Auchendinny
