= Esk Bridge railway station =

Disused railway station in Esk Bridge, Midlothian

Esk Bridge
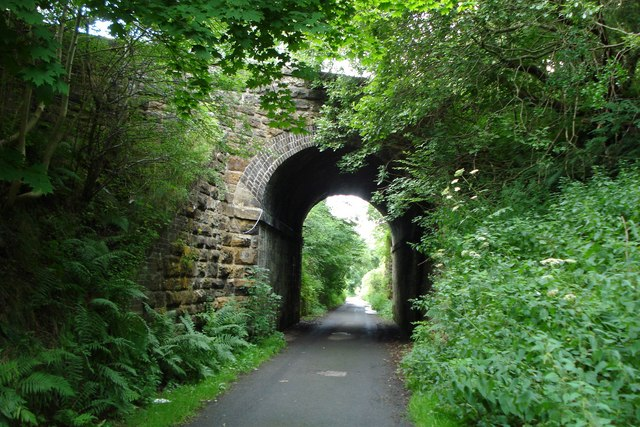
- The site of the station in 2008

General information
- Location: Esk Bridge, Midlothian; Scotland
- Coordinates: 55.8315°N 3.2072°W
- Grid reference: NT245605
- Platforms: 1

Other information
- Status: Disused

History
- Original company: Penicuik Railway
- Pre-grouping: North British Railway
- Post-grouping: LNER

Key dates
- 1 July 1874: Opened
- 1 January 1917: Closed as a wartime economy measure
- 2 June 1919: Reopened
- 22 September 1930: Closed
Location

Esk Bridge railway station served the settlement of Esk Bridge, Midlothian, Scotland from 1874 to 1930 on the Penicuik Railway.

== History ==
The station opened on 1 July 1874 by the Penicuik Railway. The station was situated south of Harpers Brae. The station was originally called Esk Bridge, but it was later changed to Eskbridge. There were no goods facilities and no sidings served Esk Mills. During the First World War the station closed on 1 January 1917 as a wartime economy measure but reopened on 2 June 1919, before closing permanently on 22 September 1930.

Preceding station	Disused railways	Following station
Auchendinny; Line and station closed	North British Railway; Penicuik Railway	Penicuik; Line and station closed
