= Auchendinny railway station =

Disused railway station in Scotland

Coordinates: 55.84315°N 3.19748°W

Auchendinny
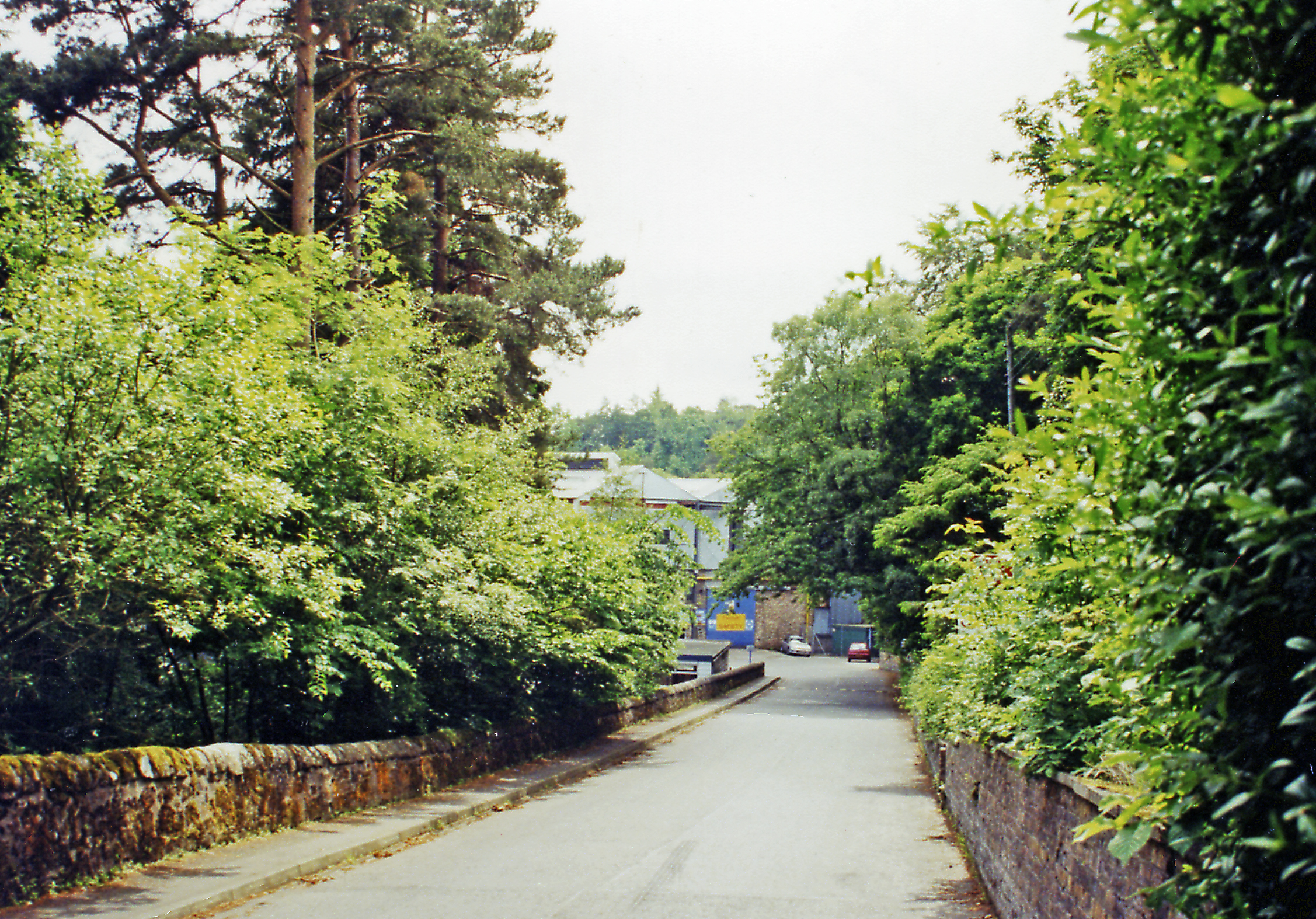
- Location of the station in 2000

General information
- Location: Auchendinny, Midlothian; Scotland
- Grid reference: NT251617
- Platforms: 1

Other information
- Status: Disused

History
- Opened: 2 July 1872; 153 years ago
- Closed: 5 March 1951; 74 years ago
- Original company: Penicuik Railway
- Pre-grouping: North British Railway
- Post-grouping: London and North Eastern Railway
Location

Auchendinny railway station was a station which served Auchendinny, in the Scottish county of Midlothian. It was served by trains on the branch line that terminated at Penicuik.

== History ==
Opened by the Penicuik Railway, then run by the North British Railway, it became part of the London and North Eastern Railway during the Grouping of 1923. The line then passed on to the Scottish Region of British Railways on nationalisation in 1948, only to be closed by British Railways three years later.

== The site today ==
The platform is still there although overgrown and the station building is a dwelling house.

Preceding station	Disused railways	Following station
Rosslyn Castle	North British Railway; Penicuik Railway	Eskbridge
