= Penicuik railway station =

Disused railway station in Penicuik, Midlothian

Penicuik
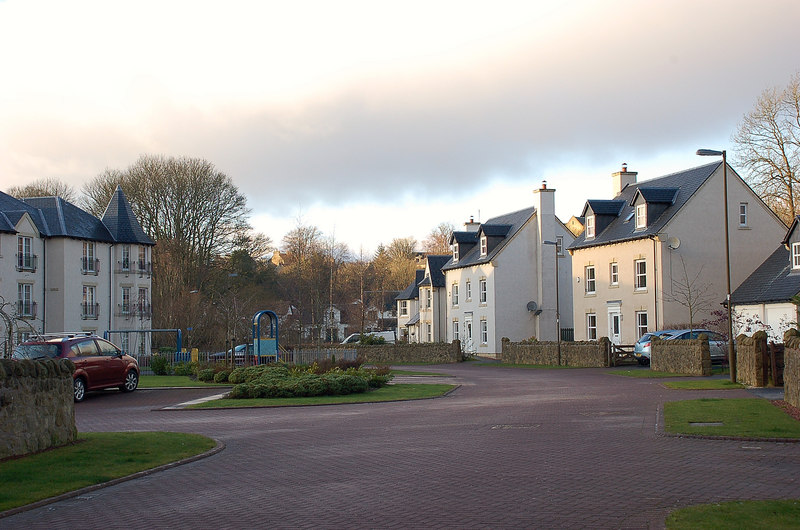
- The site of the station in 2011

General information
- Location: Penicuik, Midlothian; Scotland
- Coordinates: 55.824°N 3.2202°W
- Grid reference: NT236956
- Platforms: 1

Other information
- Status: Disused

History
- Original company: Penicuik Railway
- Pre-grouping: North British Railway
- Post-grouping: LNER; British Railways (Scottish Region)

Key dates
- 2 September 1872: Opened
- 10 September 1951: Closed for passengers
- 27 March 1967: closed completely
Location

Penicuik railway station served the town of Penicuik, Midlothian, Scotland from 1872 to 1951 on the Penicuik Railway.

== History ==
The station opened on 2 September 1872 by the Penicuik Railway. The station was situated south of Valleyfield Road. There were three sidings opposite the platform, one running under Peebles Road to the west of the station to serve Bank paper mill, which specialised in producing Bank of Scotland notes. The moderately sized goods yard consisted of four sidings, the siding closest to the station serving a loading dock before entering a large brick goods shed. Another siding served the north side of the dock and the fourth siding served Valleyfield paper mill. By 1907 the goods yard had been enlarged with one additional siding and by 1932 the siding into Valleyfield Mill had been extended. The station was closed to passengers on 10 September 1951 but remained open due to the freight traffic of the paper mills. In 1961 the siding that served Bank Mill was lifted. The goods yard closed on 27 March 1967.

| Preceding station | Disused railways | Following station |
|---|---|---|
| Esk Bridge; Line and station closed | North British Railway; Penicuik Railway | Terminus |
