= Gilmerton railway station =

Disused railway station in Gilmerton, Edinburgh

Gilmerton

General information
- Location: Gilmerton, Midlothian; Scotland
- Coordinates: 55.8999°N 3.1274°W
- Grid reference: NT296680
- Platforms: 1

Other information
- Status: Disused

History
- Original company: Edinburgh, Loanhead and Roslin Railway
- Pre-grouping: Edinburgh, Loanhead and Roslin Railway
- Post-grouping: London and North Eastern Railway

Key dates
- 23 July 1874: Opened
- 1 January 1917: Closed as a wartime economy
- 2 June 1919: Reopened
- 1 May 1933: Closed to passengers
- 1 July 1959: Closed to goods
Location

Gilmerton railway station served the suburb of Gilmerton, historically in Edinburghshire and Midlothian, Scotland, from 1874 to 1959 on the Edinburgh, Loanhead and Roslin Railway.

== History ==
The station was opened on 23 July 1874 by the Edinburgh, Loanhead and Roslin Railway. It was situated on the east side of Station Road. On the platform was the station building, which had a booking office and a waiting room. It closed as a wartime economy measure on 1 January 1917, although workmen's trains continued to call here, but reopened on 2 June 1919. To the south of. To the south of the platform was a signal box which controlled access to the goods yard, which had two sidings. Both of them served a goods dock. Passenger numbers steadily decreased over the years and the station closed to passengers on 1 May 1933 but it remained open for goods traffic until 1 July 1959. The platform and station building were demolished in 1976 and the two sidings were lifted in 1978.

| Preceding station | Disused railways | Following station |
|---|---|---|
| Millerhill; Line and station closed | Edinburgh, Loanhead and Roslin Railway | Loanhead; Line and station closed |
