= Andrew Walker (murderer) =

Scottish murderer

- Born: 1953 or 1954
- Died: 3 September 2021 (aged 67); Wishaw, North Lanarkshire, UK
- Occupation: Army corporal
- Status: Released
- Criminal charges: Murder
- Penalty: Life-27 years

Andrew Walker (1953/1954 – 3 September 2021) was a British Army corporal in the Royal Scots who murdered three colleagues in a payroll robbery in the Pentland Hills, south of Edinburgh, in January 1985. After he was convicted, Walker was sentenced to life imprisonment with a minimum term of 27 years, but was released in 2011 after a stroke.

== Murders ==
On 17 January 1985, retired Major David Cunningham, 56, Staff Sergeant Terence Hosker, 39, Royal Army Pay Corps and Private John Thomson, 25, of the Kings Own Scottish Borderers picked up a £19,000 payroll from a Penicuik bank to take to the Glencorse Barracks in Penicuik, Midlothian where all were stationed.

Corporal Andrew Walker, age 30 and deep in debt, flagged down the Land Rover that was to carry the payroll and asked for a lift; he was picked up as he was known to the three men collecting the payroll. A witness at the bank recalled that there had been four, not three, men in the vehicle.

According to the prosecution at his trial, Walker, armed with a Sterling submachine gun that he had signed out from the armoury, forced the trio to drive away from the bank. He shot Hosker in the chest when he was tackled. Telling Private Thomson to drive along a quiet track to a reservoir, he shot Cunningham through the head. Thomson was then forced to unload the bodies of his colleagues before being shot himself in the head and abdomen. The money was never recovered and is thought to be buried in the hills.

Walker was presumably intending to drive back to the barracks before he was missed, and return the weapon, but the Land Rover skidded into a ditch and his movements were under scrutiny by the time he was able to get back. He returned the gun, and went absent without leave for three days, then returned, denying any knowledge of the murders. Ballistic and other evidence was found, and Walker was arrested.

== Trial ==
While imprisoned on remand, charged with the murders, Walker shared a cell with 18-year-old Andrew Lowden, also on remand. Lowden claimed that Walker was physically violent towards him and threatened to kill Lowden's father and girlfriend, and that Walker had confessed to the murders in lurid detail on the eve of the trial. When Lowden was released, Walker blackmailed Lowden into taking a letter out of the prison, placing the blame for the murders on the Provisional Irish Republican Army (Provisional IRA), a terrorist organisation that made many attacks at the time. The letter was found and confiscated by the guards, and Lowden was later called as a prosecution witness at Walker's trial.

In his defence, Walker claimed he was driving elsewhere during the murders and suggested that they were the actions of the IRA. He claimed that the bullet shell cases linking him to the murder weapon were planted.

Walker was found guilty of murder, the theft of the money, and attempting to pervert the course of justice for trying to smuggle the letter out of prison.

The judge, Lord Grieve, jailed Walker for life and recommended that he should serve at least a minimum term of 30 years. Grieve noted "This was a calculated crime. The accused, if he was to achieve his purpose, had to kill. I am quite satisfied that the crime was carefully planned, and I am also quite sure that the substance of the evidence given by Walker was a tissue of lies." He called the crimes "callous, brutal and calculated".

Walker's conviction was upheld on appeal, but the minimum term was shortened to 27 years as Walker successfully argued in 2002 that he should not have been treated more harshly than other murderers.

== Background and motive ==
Walker was in debt at the time of the murders. He owed £2,000 on a car bill and was about to take delivery of a car worth £8,500. His army colleagues reported that he was a liar and braggart, and generally unpopular. After an initially successful career in the army, with three tours to Northern Ireland and a mention in dispatches, he had been the subject of disciplinary penalties in the months before the robbery and murders. A commanding officer, Lt Col Fairweather, had disciplined him and said: "Unless you get a grip of yourself, I can see you wearing a blue suit and eating porridge".

== Release ==
In 2009, Walker suffered a stroke which left him severely disabled; in December 2011, he was released from prison on compassionate grounds. He died from a respiratory infection and suspected cancer in a care home in Wishaw, North Lanarkshire in 2021, at the age of 67.
