= Glencorse railway station =

Disused railway station in Glencorse, Midlothian

Glencorse

General information
- Location: Glencorse, Midlothian; Scotland
- Coordinates: 55.8453°N 3.2057°W
- Grid reference: NT246620
- Platforms: 1

Other information
- Status: Disused

History
- Original company: Edinburgh, Loanhead and Roslin Railway
- Pre-grouping: Edinburgh, Loanhead and Roslin Railway
- Post-grouping: London and North Eastern Railway

Key dates
- 2 July 1877: Opened as Glencross
- 1 May 1933: Closed to passengers
- 1 July 1959: Closed to goods
Location

Glencorse railway station served the parish of Glencorse, Midlothian, Scotland, from 1877 to 1959 on the Edinburgh, Loanhead and Roslin Railway.

== History ==
The station was opened as Glencross on 2 July 1877 by the Edinburgh, Loanhead and Roslin Railway. It was situated on a footpath near the A701. Its name was changed to Glencorse in December 1877, as suggested by John Inglis. There was suggestion that the name should be changed to Greenlaw but that would have caused confusion with the station of the same name. On the platform was the station building, which had a waiting room, toilets and a booking office. The stationmaster's house was behind this. At the south end of the platform was the signal box, which controlled access to the goods yard. The yard had two sidings, one serving a loading dock. To the south were further sidings that served Mauricewood Colliery. Passenger numbers slowly dropped after 1905 so it closed on 1 May 1933 but it remained open for goods traffic. The signal box closed in 1934 and the waiting room section of the station building was demolished. Although it had closed to regular passengers, there were weekly recreational passenger trains that started from 2 October 1943 and ended on 29 August 1959. The station closed to goods traffic on 1 July 1959. The track was lifted shortly after. The station buildings were demolished in 1973 and the stationmaster's house was beyond repair. Most of the site has been landscaped and there is a house nearby.

Preceding station	Disused railways	Following station
Roslin; Line and station closed	Edinburgh, Loanhead and Roslin Railway	Terminus
