= Auchendinny =

Coordinates: 55.847°N 3.192°W

Auchendinny: Scottish Gaelic: Achadh an t-Sionnaich
- Location within Midlothian
- OS grid reference: NT253621
- Council area: Midlothian
- Lieutenancy area: Midlothian
- Country: Scotland
- Sovereign state: United Kingdom
- Post town: PENICUIK
- Postcode district: EH26
- Dialling code: 01968
- Police: Scotland
- Fire: Scottish
- Ambulance: Scottish
- UK Parliament: Midlothian
- Scottish Parliament: Midlothian South, Tweeddale and Lauderdale

Auchendinny (Scottish Gaelic: Achadh an t-Sionnaich, meaning field of the fox) is a small village in Glencorse near Penicuik, Midlothian, Scotland. The village had a paper mill at Dalmore, until its closure in 2005. This was Midlothian's last remaining papermill and after demolition is now the site of new home development. Nearby Auchendinny House was the last country house designed by gentleman architect Sir William Bruce.

== Buildings of Note ==
Penicuik was the heart of the Scottish paper industry, and the nearby mill (the Brunt Mill) at Auchendinny was established in 1716. The mill was destroyed by fire in the 1840s. It became a laundry in 1856, serving Queen Victoria during her residence at Holyroodhouse, and operated as such until the 1960s.

Auchendinny House was remodelled by Robert Lorimer in 1900.

== Notable residents ==
- Billy Purvis (1853), entertainer and showman
- George Affleck, footballer for Grimsby Town and Leeds City

== See also ==
- Auchendinny railway station
