= Roslin railway station =

Disused railway station in Roslin, Midlothian

Roslin
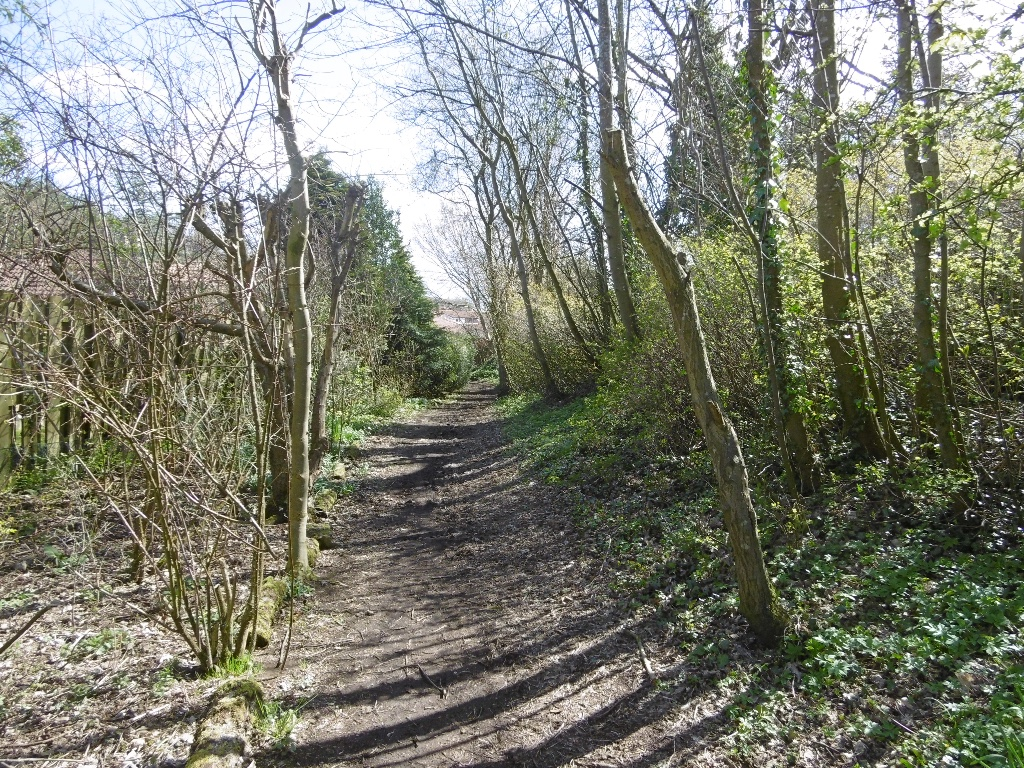
- The site of the trackbed in 2016

General information
- Location: Roslin, Midlothian; Scotland
- Coordinates: 55.8601°N 3.1646°W
- Grid reference: NT272636
- Platforms: 1

Other information
- Status: Disused

History
- Original company: Edinburgh, Loanhead and Roslin Railway
- Pre-grouping: Edinburgh, Loanhead and Roslin Railway
- Post-grouping: London and North Eastern Railway

Key dates
- 23 July 1874: Opened
- 1 May 1933: Closed to passengers
- 1 June 1959: Closed to goods
Location

Roslin railway station served the village of Roslin, Midlothian, Scotland, from 1874 to 1959 on the Edinburgh, Loanhead and Roslin Railway.

== History ==
The station was opened on 23 July 1874 by the Edinburgh, Loanhead and Roslin Railway. It was situated on the opposite end of Station Road. It was also known as Roslin for Roslin Village, Roslin Castle and Roslin Chapel. Constructing the station was initially an issue because the site they wanted to build it on was already occupied by a school. The Edinburgh, Loanhead and Roslin Railway offered the school £400, and they resited the school near the town centre. To the south was an engine shed, a turntable and the goods yard. The yard had three sidings, one of them serving a goods shed behind the platform. There was initially no signal box, but one was built in the early 20th century. It was on the downside and allowed access to the goods yard. Passenger numbers slowly decreased after 1920 and the station closed to passengers on 1 May 1933 but it remained open for goods traffic. The engine shed closed shortly after and was mostly demolished by 1936. The signal box closed in the 1950s and was demolished along with the goods shed. The station closed to goods traffic on 1 June 1959. Only two sidings remained at that time, one being private. The derelict station was vandalised and set on fire in 1973. It was quickly demolished after this. The site is now occupied by housing.

Preceding station	Disused railways	Following station
Loanhead; Line and station closed	Edinburgh, Loanhead and Roslin Railway	Glencorse; Line and station closed
