= George Affleck (footballer) =

Scottish footballer

- Cope's Cigarette card featuring George Affleck

Personal information
- Full name: George Affleck
- Date of birth: 1 July 1888
- Place of birth: Auchendinny, Scotland
- Height: 5 ft 8 in (1.73 m)
- Position: Defender

Senior career*
Years	Team	Apps	(Gls)
- Penicuik
1909–1919	Leeds City	182	(1)
1919–1924	Grimsby Town	197	(0)
- * Club domestic league appearances and goals

George Affleck (born 1888 in Auchendinny, Scotland) was a footballer who played in the English Football League for Grimsby Town and Leeds City. Following his retirement, he became a football coach in Rotterdam.
