= Glencorse =

Parish near Edinburgh, Scotland

Coordinates: 55.8507°N 3.2042°W

- Location within Midlothian
- Population: 5,293
- OS grid reference: NT2470362607
- Council area: Midlothian
- Lieutenancy area: Midlothian
- Country: Scotland
- Sovereign state: United Kingdom
- Post town: Penicuik
- Postcode district: EH26
- Dialling code: 01968
- Police: Scotland
- Fire: Scottish
- Ambulance: Scottish
- UK Parliament: Midlothian
- Scottish Parliament: Midlothian South, Tweeddale and Lauderdale and Midlothian North and Musselburgh

Glencorse is a parish of Midlothian, Scotland, lying 7 miles (11 kilometres) south of Edinburgh. It is bounded on the north-west by the former parish of Colinton now within the City of Edinburgh, to the north and west by Lasswade and to the south and west by Penicuik.

The parish is in the northern part of the Penicuik and District Community Council area and includes the village of Auchendinny near its eastern boundary.

The parish is traversed from west to east by Glencorse Burn, part of whose valley contains Glencorse Reservoir, which was formed in 1819–28 by damming the burn's glen with a huge embankment 40 m (130 ft) high. The reservoir is a source of Edinburgh's water supply. Also in the parish are Glencorse Barracks, Bush House, Glencorse House, Woodhouselee and Easter Howgate. The northern part of the parish includes some of the Pentland Hills and the highest point within the parish is Turnhouse Hill (428 m or 1,403 ft).

Historical records of the parish before 1878 spell it in various different ways - Glencors, Glencrosss, Glencrosse and Glencorse. After 1878 the last was normally used. There are several theories about the origin of the name Glencorse. One is that it comes form the Gaelic gleann - a glen and grosg or craig, a crossing - so a glen crossing the Pentland hills. George Chalmers in his book "Caledonia" claims the name comes from "a very remarkable cross, which has been erected in the vale of Glencross by pious hands." Yet another theory is that the name comes from a miraculous cross that appeared above Carnethy hill and encouraged the Scottish soldiers to defeat the English forces at the Battle of Roslin in 1303.

The parish is divided between two Scottish Parliamentary constituencies: Midlothian North and Musselburgh to the north of Glencorse Burn and Midlothian South, Tweeddale and Lauderdale south of the burn.

== History ==
The parish was originally named after St. Catherine, because of the chapel (St. Catherine-in-the-Hopes) dedicated to her which stood in the valley of Glencorse Burn (now submerged under a reservoir) and is mentioned in a record dated 1230. The parish of Glencorse was formed sometime before 1560 with the chapel of St. Catherine-in-the-Hopes as its church. Over the next century the parish was variously combined with the parishes of Dalkeith, Lasswade, Penicuik, Pentlands and the Bishopric of Edinburgh (In 1616, for example, it included the ancient parishes of Pentland and Penicuik, the northern part being taken from the parish of Pentland [Barony of Fulford] and the southern part from Penicuik). In March 1647, Glencorse was re-created by act of Parliament as a separate Parish with its own church building near the centre of the parish.

The Battle of Rullion Green between Covenanters and Scottish Government troops took place in 1666 in Glencorse Parish. The Covenanters were defeated.

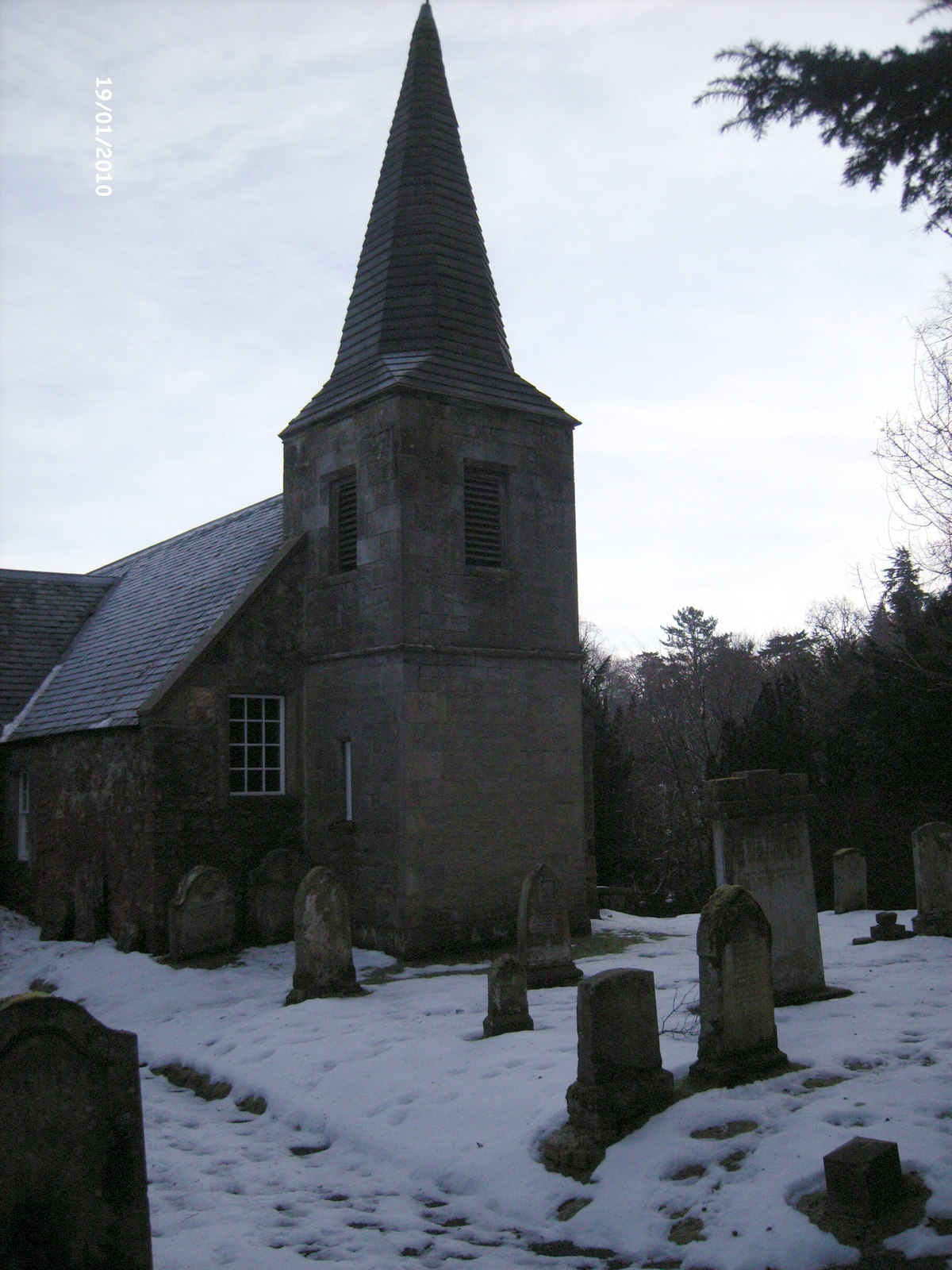
Glencorse Old Church (geograph 2174449)

The 1647 parish church was rebuilt. It was repaired and rebuilt several times from 1661 to 1691 and then mostly destroyed in a fire in 1697. The church (now known as the Glencorse Old Kirk) was rebuilt in 1699 with the north and south aisles being added and accommodation for 180 people. A tower and belfry were added to the church during renovations in 1811. The author Robert Louis Stevenson attended services in the church in his youth when he lived in Swanston village nearby and once described the Old Kirk as the "most delightful place on earth." Stevenson's letters to his friends often mention the Old Kirk and he used his memories as models for the churches in his books "A Lowder Sabbath Morning," "Weir of Hermiston" and "The Body Snatcher." Locally in Penicuik and Midlothian the Glencorse kirkyard was nicknamed "the Pirates Graveyard" due to the skull and crossbones on the graves despite this being a common feature on many graves.

The Old Kirk building acquired a new roof about 2004 and, in 2021, was rented out for weddings and events, having been superseded for parish use by a much larger church. The renovated church was used as a location for one of the scenes in season 1 of the Outlander television series. The Glencorse Old Kirk of Glencorse became too small for the parish due to the increased numbers of Royal Scots troops at Glencorse Barracks. The Minister at the time, the Rev. William Baillie Strong (1878–1928) was the driving force behind the building of a new church. The Rt. Hon. John Inglis offered a free site for the new church and funds to help with the construction. Col. Robert Trotter, of Bush House also donated funds for a new building and a site to use as a cemetery, namely a field of about an acre at New Milton farm as the Old Kirk cemetery was full. The new church, designed by the architect Sir Rowand Anderson, was erected in 1885 and could seat 500 people. The font was found in the floor of the Old Kirk during renovations in 1811 and is thought to have originally come from the Chapel of St Catherine, which was flooded during the creation of the Glencorse Reservoir. The tower was erected 10 years after the main church using funds donated by John Inglis's son H.H. Inglis.

A Parochial Board was established under the Poor Law (Scotland) Act 1845. With the Local Government (Scotland) Act 1894 the Parish Council was established, which continued until 1930 when parish councils in Scotland were abolished. Civil parishes persist for census and other non-administrative purposes.

The civil parish has an area of 4,245 acres and a population of 5,293 (in 2011).

== Notable residents ==
- C. T. R. Wilson (1869–1959) winner of the Nobel Prize for Physics in 1927

== See also ==
- Glencorse railway station
