= Glencorse Barracks =

British Army barracks in Midlothian, Scotland

- Part of Edinburgh Garrison
- Penicuik, Midlothian in Scotland
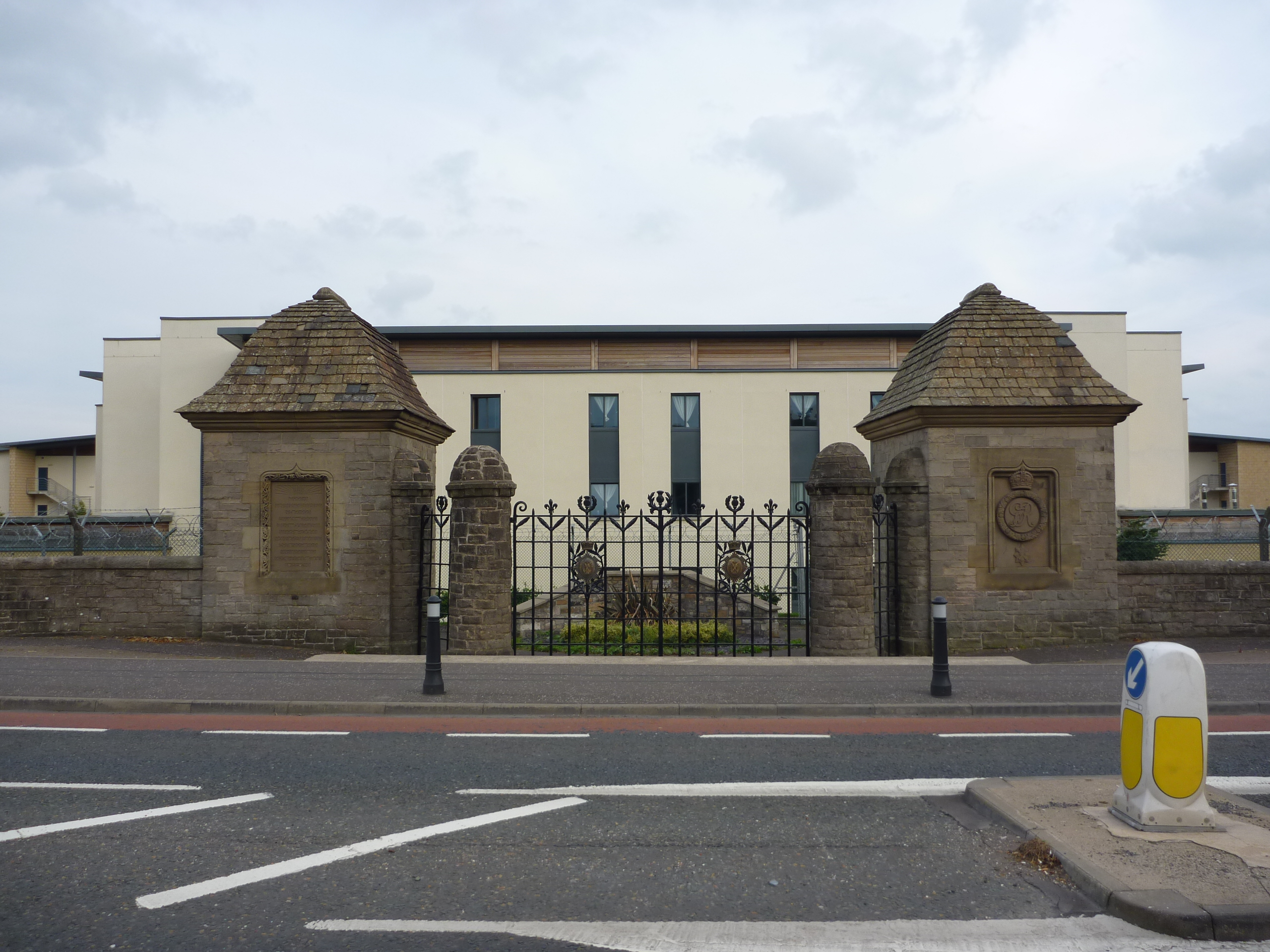
- Former entrance to Glencorse Barracks

Site information
- Type: Army barracks
- Owner: Ministry of Defence
- Operator: British Army
- Condition: Operational

Location
- Location within Midlothian
- Coordinates: 55°50′43″N 3°12′12″W
- Area: 38 hectares (94 acres)

Site history
- Built: 1803
- Built for: War Office
- In use: 1803 – present

Garrison information
- Garrison: The Royal Highland Fusiliers, 2nd Battalion The Royal Regiment of Scotland

Glencorse Barracks is a British Army barracks situated in Glencorse just outside the town of Penicuik in Midlothian, Scotland. It is one of the three barracks which make up the City of Edinburgh Garrison, with Dreghorn and Redford Barracks. It has been the home for The Royal Highland Fusiliers, 2nd Battalion, The Royal Regiment of Scotland since 2006.

== History ==
The site was originally occupied by Greenlaw House, a 17th-century mansion. The current buildings on the site were constructed in 1803, during the Napoleonic Wars, when they were first used to hold French prisoners of war in a facility then known as Greenlaw Military Prison. The only surviving building from that time is the former Prison Guardroom, which is now the Clocktower. In 1804 Greenlaw House was itself converted to accommodate prisoners of war. Nothing remains of house: however, it is thought that the cellars of the officers' mess owe their existence to this mansion.

The whole site, which had previously been leased from a private landlord, was acquired outright by the War Office in 1812. Additional buildings were erected in 1813, at a cost of £100,000, to house 6,000 prisoners and their guards. However, the Napoleonic Wars came to an end a year later and the prisoners were sent home. Most of the prisoners were crews of privateers - nearly 300 men were confined in the mansion house. Ensign Hugh Maxwell was convicted of culpable homicide for the death, in January 1807, of Charles Cottier, a prisoner in Greenlaw House. Maxwell was the commander of a guard of 36 men of the Lanarkshire Militia, who were, at the time, based in Penicuik. He was imprisoned in the Tolbooth at Canongate for 9 months.

A monument which was erected at Valleyfield in memory of those prisoners who died in captivity is now surrounded by houses in this redeveloped area of the river valley.

Although for a while it was a Military Prison, the facilities were little used between 1815 and 1875, when they were converted into a major infantry barracks at a cost of £30,000. Their creation took place as part of the Cardwell Reforms which encouraged the localisation of British military forces. The barracks became the depot for the two regular battalions and one militia battalion of the 1st Regiment of Foot (Royal Scots). Following the Childers Reforms, the regiment evolved to become the Royal Scots with its depot in the barracks in 1881.

The barracks went on to become the regional centre for infantry training as the Lowland Brigade Depot in 1960. In 1970, following the formation of the Scottish Division, junior soldiers from the Lowland Brigade moved from Glencorse to Gordon Barracks, in Aberdeen. Adult Highland Brigade recruits moved from Gordon Barracks to The Scottish Division Depôt at Glencorse Barracks on the same day.

Royal Scots corporal Andrew Walker killed three Army colleagues in a payroll robbery in the Pentland Hills, south of Edinburgh, in January 1985. He was jailed for life. All three were stationed in Glencorse barracks.

The barracks closed in 2003 for a £60 million revamp.

As part of the Future Force 2020 budgetary announcement in July 2011, RAF Kirknewton was to have been developed into a major Army base to host a Multi-Role Brigade with Glencorse Barracks being expanded. However plans to develop Kirknewton as an Army barracks were scrapped in March 2013.

In November 2016 the Ministry of Defence announced that the site would close in 2032. However, it was subsequently announced in November 2021 that the barracks would not be closing due to the British Army's Future Soldier plans and more troops would be stationed in Scotland in general.

Glencorse Barracks had 480 UK Armed Forces Service personnel based there at 1 January 2024.

== See also ==
- Armed forces in Scotland
- List of British Army installations
- Military history of Scotland
