= Penicuik Railway =

Former railway line in Scotland

The Penicuik Railway

Overview
- Locale: Scotland

History
- Opened: 1872
- Closed: 1967

Technical
- Track gauge: 1,435 mm (4 ft 8 1/2 in)

The Penicuik Railway was a railway line in Midlothian, Scotland, serving paper mills located on the River North Esk. It opened in 1872 and a substantial residential passenger traffic built up. The line was 4 1/2 miles long.

Passenger usage fell off sharply in the mid-twentieth century and the passenger service was discontinued in 1951. A basic goods train service continued until the line finally closed to all traffic in 1967. There is no railway use of the line nowadays.

== History ==
=== Before the Penicuik Railway ===
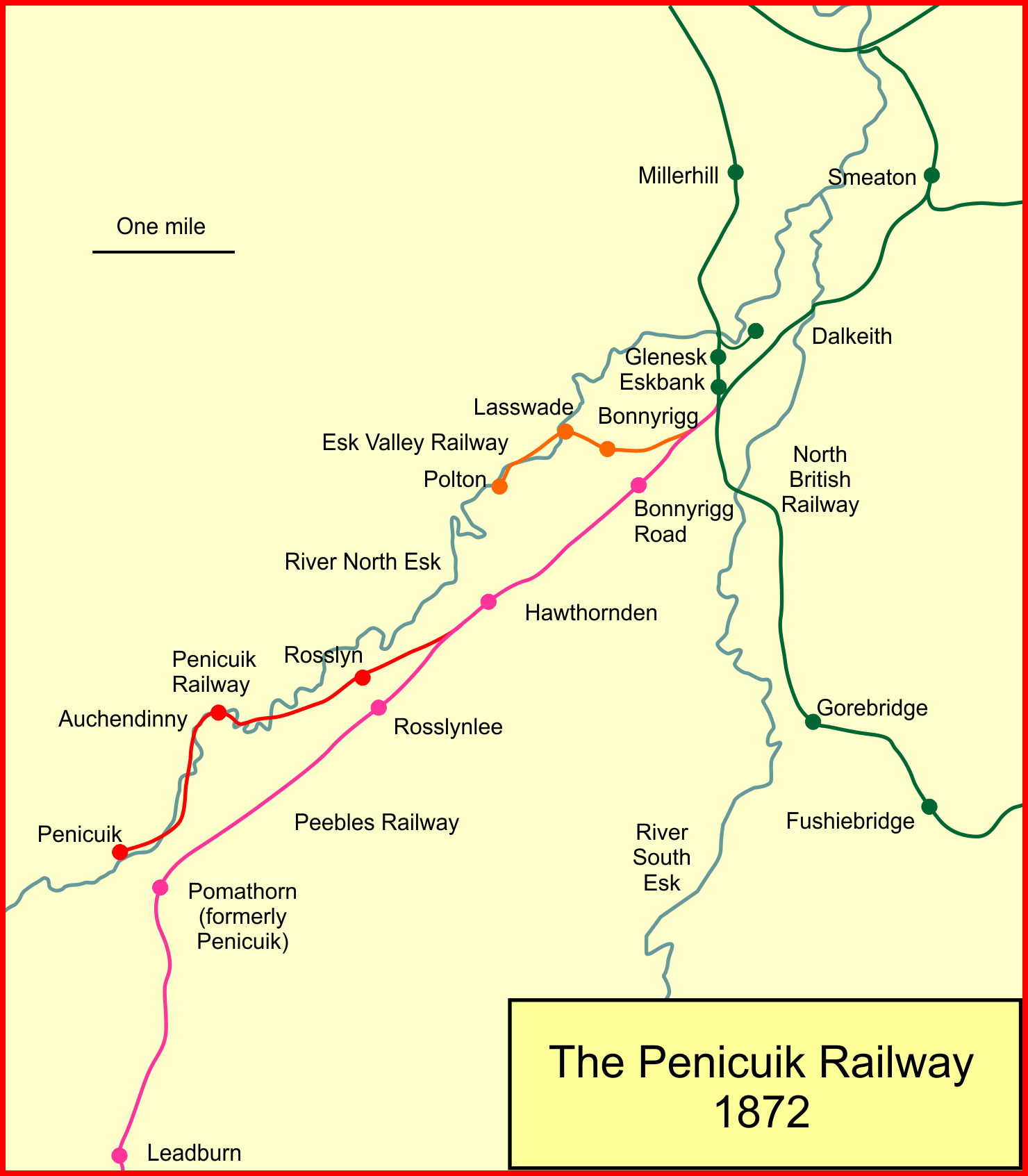
System map of the Penicuik Railway

By 1848 most of the great trunk railways of Scotland had been built, as well as a considerable number of branches. Communities in rural areas found that a railway connection reduced the cost of necessities considerably, and made it cheaper to get local manufactures to market. Conversely places without a railway suffered. The Peebles Railway opened in 1855, transforming the economy of the town. The Peebles Railway ran on high ground well to the east of the River North Esk.

The area around Penicuik itself was found to be rich in minerals, and the Shotts Iron Company established extensive ironstone and coal pits in the locality. The mineral had to be carted to Eskbank station, a considerable inconvenience.

The Caledonian Railway was known to be planning a railway to Penicuik from Slateford, and this alarmed the North British Railway (NBR), which wished to keep the area exclusively under its own control, and keep the rival Caledonian company out. The NBR encouraged the promotion of the Esk Valley Railway, which opened as far as Polton in 1867. The line primarily served paper mills adjacent to the river, and because of the terrain was unsuitable for connecting to the pits.

This left the mining around Penicuik still to be connected, and two independent railways were promoted to connect to the mines: the Edinburgh, Loanhead and Roslin Railway (ELRR) and the Penicuik Railway. The Penicuik line sprang into active promotion in December 1869, causing some friction with the supporters of the Loanhead line, who had been working up their scheme for several years. The NBR agreed to work and maintain the Penicuik line in perpetuity for 45% of gross receipts. Both were nominally independent and sponsored by the NBR, and both obtained their authorising acts of Parliament on the same day, 28 June 1870. (Note: Thomas (NBR, volume 1, page 106) says 20 June 1870)

=== The Penicuik Railway ===
Penicuik Railway Act 1870
- Act of Parliament
- Parliament of the United Kingdom
- Long title: An Act for making a Railway from the Hawthornden station of the Peebles Railway to Penicuik in the county of Edinburgh; and for other purposes.
- Citation: 33 & 34 Vict. c. xli

Dates
- Royal assent: 28 June 1870

Text of statute as originally enacted

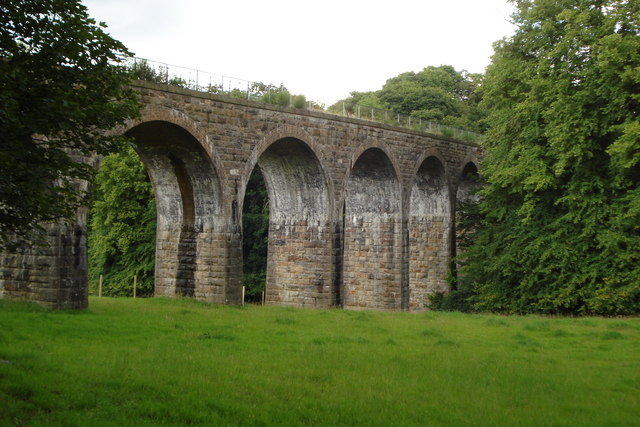
The Firth Viaduct near Auchendinny

The Penicuik Railway obtained its authorising act of Parliament, the Penicuik Railway Act 1870 (33 & 34 Vict. c. xli), on 28 June 1870; the capital was £72,000 for the four-mile line. The company's engineer was Thomas Bouch. The terrain was difficult, for the line followed the sinuous River North Esk, which runs between steep hillsides on both sides; the line crossed the River North Esk seven times in two and a half miles, and there was a viaduct and two tunnels. The line left the Peebles Railway at Hawthornden, and there were stations at Rosslyn and Auchendinny as well as Penicuik.

The line opened for goods traffic on 9 May 1872 and to passengers on 2 September 1872. (Note: Ross, Carter, Paterson and Awdry; Thomas (Forgotten Railways, page 48) and Munro say 2 July.) Eskbridge station was added on 1 July 1874.

The Board of Trade Inspecting Officer visited the line on 12 and 19 January 1872 to consider approval for passenger train operation. There was a gunpowder factory at Roslin Glen close to the line, and concern had already been expressed about the danger from sparks from engines, and the inspecting officer ordered the Penicuik Railway Company to build a tunnel or other cover for the line at that point. It was formed as a 300-yard-long metal tubular structure.

Although it was the mineral working around Penicuik which had prompted the idea of the line, in fact it served paper mills primarily; they required copious supplies of water and were located in the valley floor. It was the ELRR, running at a higher level on the west side of the River Esk, which actually connected into the mineral workings.

In 1875, the Shotts Iron Company sank a new shaft at Greenlaw near Glencorse Barracks, and (encouraged by the NBR) the ELRR sought parliamentary authority to extend the line to serve the mine. This was opposed bitterly by the Penicuik Railway, who saw it as an encroachment. The Penicuik Company had hoped to serve the mine workings but the ELRR line would interpose itself, and be more convenient. Finally the two companies agreed to pool all traffic south of Auchendinny on the Penicuik line and all traffic south of Roslin on the ELRR.

=== Taken over by the North British ===
The Penicuik Railway was absorbed by the North British Railway, authorised by the North British Railway (Additional Powers) Act 1876 (39 & 40 Vict. c. cxxxiv) of 13 July 1876, and effective on 1 August 1876. The North British Railway promised that they would "in all time coming keep up as efficient a passenger train service as at present". The Penicuik Railway shares were exchanged at par.

The line served several paper mills, and the attractive nature of the area encouraged residential travel by Edinburgh professionals. The line prospered for many years as an outer suburban branch, and for many years the railway was the only practicable means of residential travel to Edinburgh.

=== Passenger train service ===
The sixteen mile train journey from Penicuik to Edinburgh took about 40 minutes.

In 1895 there were five Monday to Friday departures, with an additional two on Saturday. In 1922 this had become five plus one, and in 1938 it was five plus three.

In 1949 the train service had four departures Monday to Friday, five on Saturday.

== Closure and current use ==
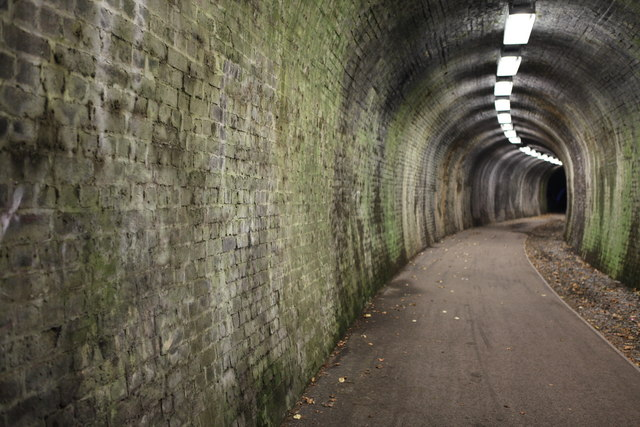
Cycle path tunnel near Auchendinny

Esk Bridge closed in 1930, Auchendinny station was closed on 5 March 1951, and the branch closed to passenger traffic on 10 September 1951, the last train having run two days earlier

The last passenger train on the branch was a railtour on 29 August 1964. There were two landslides on the line in 1966, and at that time the only remaining traffic was an occasional goods train to Penicuik. The cost of the rectification considerably exceeded income, and the line was closed to all traffic on 27 March 1967, and the tracks were quickly lifted.

Part of the line forms a section of the National Cycle Network as route 73.

== Topography ==
It is believed that the main station building at Penicuik dated from the Napoleonic Wars and was used as a kitchen for feeding French prisoners of war.

Locations on the line were:

- Hawthornden Junction; diverging from the Peebles Railway;
- Rosslyn; opened 2 September 1872; renamed Rosslyn Castle 1874; closed 10 September 1951;
- Auchendinny; opened 2 September 1872; closed 5 March 1951;
- Esk Bridge; opened 1 July 1874; soon renamed Eskbridge; occasionally shown as Eskbridge Junction in timetables; closed 1 January 1917; reopened 2 June 1919; closed 22 September 1930;
- Penicuik; opened 2 September 1872; closed 10 September 1951.
