= Gifford and Garvald Railway =

Former railway line in Scotland

Overview
- Locale: Scotland
- Successor: North British Railway

Technical
- Track gauge: 4 ft 8 1/2 in (1,435 mm)
- Length: 9 1/4 mi (14.9 km)

The Gifford and Garvald Railway was a 9.25-mile-long (14.89 km) single-track branch railway line in East Lothian, Scotland, that ran from a junction west of Ormiston on the Macmerry Branch to Gifford via three intermediate stations, Pencaitland, Saltoun, and Humbie.

== History ==
Gifford and Garvald Railway Act 1891
- Act of Parliament
- Parliament of the United Kingdom
- Long title: An Act to incorporate the Gifford and Garvald Railway Company and to empower them to construct a Railway in the County of Haddington and for other purposes.
- Citation: 54 & 55 Vict. c. lxxxv

Dates
- Royal assent: 3 July 1891

Text of statute as originally enacted

Gifford and Garvald Railway Act 1893
- Act of Parliament
- Parliament of the United Kingdom
- Long title: An Act to enable the Gifford and Garvald Railway Company to construct a Deviation Railway and for other purposes.
- Citation: 56 & 57 Vict. c. cc

Dates
- Royal assent: 24 August 1893

Text of statute as originally enacted

The line was proposed in November 1890 and the company was authorised by the Gifford and Garvald Railway Act 1891 (54 & 55 Vict. c. lxxxv) on 3 July 1891 to construct a line of 12 miles and 200 yards. Only 9.25 miles of line was completed and opened on 14 October 1901. Run by the North British Railway from opening the line remained independent until 1923 when it became part of the London and North Eastern Railway. At Pencaitland, the line served the Glenkinchie distillery, and continued onward to Gifford where it terminated next to what is now the Gifford Community Woodland. The extension of the line to Garvald was never completed.

The line closed to passengers on 3 April 1933 when the Macmerry Branch withdrew its services. After a bridge collapse in August 1948 the section from Gifford to Humbie closed but the remaining line stayed open. On 2 May 1960 the line past Humbie closed to freight and the remaining line on 25 April 1965.

== See also ==
The Smeaton railway branches of the Lothians

=== Bibliography ===
- Awdry, Christopher (1990). Encyclopaedia of British Railway Companies. Sparkford: Patrick Stephens Ltd. ISBN 1-8526-0049-7. OCLC 19514063. CN 8983.
- Jowett, Alan (March 1989). Jowett's Railway Atlas of Great Britain and Ireland: From Pre-Grouping to the Present Day (1st ed.). Sparkford: Patrick Stephens Ltd. ISBN 978-1-85260-086-0. OCLC 22311137.
- Hajducki, Andrew M. (1994). The Haddington, Macmerry and Gifford Branch Lines. Oxford: Oakwood Press. ISBN 0-85361-456-3.
