= Cairney railway station =

Disused railway station in Millerhill, Midlothian

Cairney

General information
- Location: Millerhill, Midlothian; Scotland
- Coordinates: 55.9242°N 3.0825°W
- Grid reference: NT324706

Other information
- Status: Disused

History
- Original company: Edinburgh and Dalkeith Railway
- Pre-grouping: North British Railway

Key dates
- 1844: Opened
- 1849: Closed
Location

Cairney railway station served the village of Millerhill, Midlothian, Scotland from 1844 to 1849 on the Edinburgh and Dalkeith Railway.

== History ==
The station opened in March 1844 by the Edinburgh and Dalkeith Railway. The station was in the middle of Millerhill Marshalling Yard. Information on this intermediate station, like the rest on the line, is vague. It is unlikely that the station had any facilities or platforms. The station closed when the North British Railway took over for re-gauging; it never reopened.

Preceding station	Disused railways	Following station
Niddrie; Line and station closed	Edinburgh and Dalkeith Railway	Millerhill; Line and station closed
