= Eskbank railway station =

Railway station in Midlothian, Scotland

Eskbank Scottish Gaelic: Bruach Easg
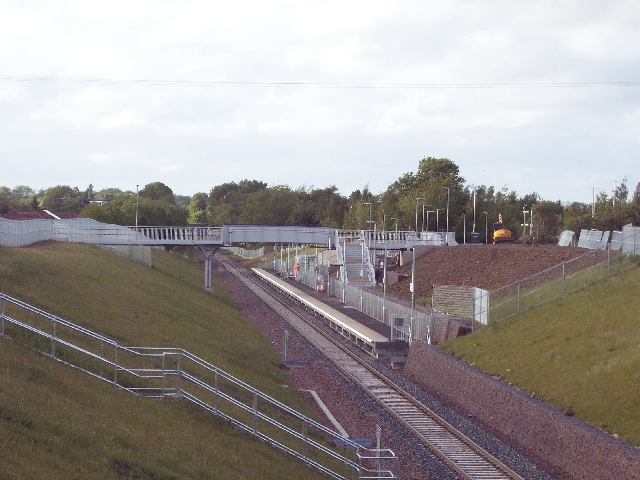

General information
- Location: Dalkeith, Midlothian; Scotland
- Coordinates: 55°52′53″N 3°04′58″W
- Grid reference: NT323660
- Owner: Network Rail
- Manager: ScotRail
- Platforms: 1

Other information
- Station code: EKB

History
- Original company: Edinburgh and Hawick Railway
- Pre-grouping: North British Railway
- Post-grouping: London and North Eastern Railway; British Rail (Scottish Region)

Key dates
- July 1849: Opened as Gallowshall
- October 1850: Renamed Eskbank and Dalkeith
- 6 January 1969: Closed
- 6 September 2015: Resited and reopened as Eskbank

Passengers
- 2020/21: ▼45,402
- 2021/22: ▲0.159 million
- 2022/23: ▲0.203 million
- 2023/24: ▲0.275 million
- 2024/25: ▲0.286 million
Location
- Location within Midlothian
Notes
- Passenger statistics from the Office of Rail and Road

Eskbank is a railway station on the Borders Railway, which runs between Edinburgh Waverley and Tweedbank. The station, situated 8 miles 25 chains (13 km) south-east of Edinburgh Waverley, serves the towns of Bonnyrigg and Dalkeith in Midlothian, Scotland. It is owned by Network Rail and managed by ScotRail.

== History ==
The original Eskbank and Dalkeith railway station was previously closed (along with the Waverley Route) in 1969. The new construction work was undertaken by BAM Nuttall. The new station, further south than the original, opened on 6 September 2015.

== Facilities ==
Car parking space is available for 248 cars and also cycle storage space.

== Services ==
As of the May 2021 timetable change, the station is served by an hourly service between Edinburgh Waverley and Tweedbank, with a half-hourly service operating at peak times (Monday to Saturday). Some peak time trains continue to Glenrothes with Thornton. All services are operated by ScotRail.

Rolling stock used: Class 158 Express Sprinter and Class 170 Turbostar

== Notes ==
Preceding station	National Rail	Following station
Shawfair	ScotRail; Borders Railway	Newtongrange
	Historical railways	
Glenesk	North British Railway; Waverley Route	Dalhousie
	Disused railways	
Broomieknowe	North British Railway; Esk Valley Railway	Terminus
Bonnyrigg	North British Railway; Peebles Railway	Terminus
Terminus	North British Railway; Macmerry Branch	Crossgatehall Halt
Terminus	North British Railway; Macmerry Branch	Smeaton
