= Lasswade Road railway station =

Disused railway station in Lasswade, Midlothian

Lasswade Road

General information
- Location: Lasswade, Midlothian; Scotland
- Coordinates: 55.8914°N 3.0828°W
- Grid reference: NT323670

Other information
- Status: Disused

History
- Original company: Edinburgh and Dalkeith Railway
- Pre-grouping: North British Railway

Key dates
- June 1843: Opened
- 1849: Closed
Location

Lasswade Road railway station served the village of Lasswade, Midlothian, Scotland from 1843 to 1849 on the Edinburgh and Dalkeith Railway.

== History ==
The station opened in June 1843 by the Edinburgh and Dalkeith Railway. The station was situated on both sides of Lasswade Road. A North British Railway map from 1844 shows that this was an intermediate station on the line. It is unlikely that the station had any facilities or platforms. When the NBR took over the line, the station was closed for re-gauging and never reopened.

Preceding station	Historical railways	Following station
Glenesk; Line open -station closed	Edinburgh and Dalkeith Railway	Eskbank and Dalkeith; Line and station open
