= Dalkeith railway station =

Disused railway station in Dalkeith, Midlothian

Dalkeith
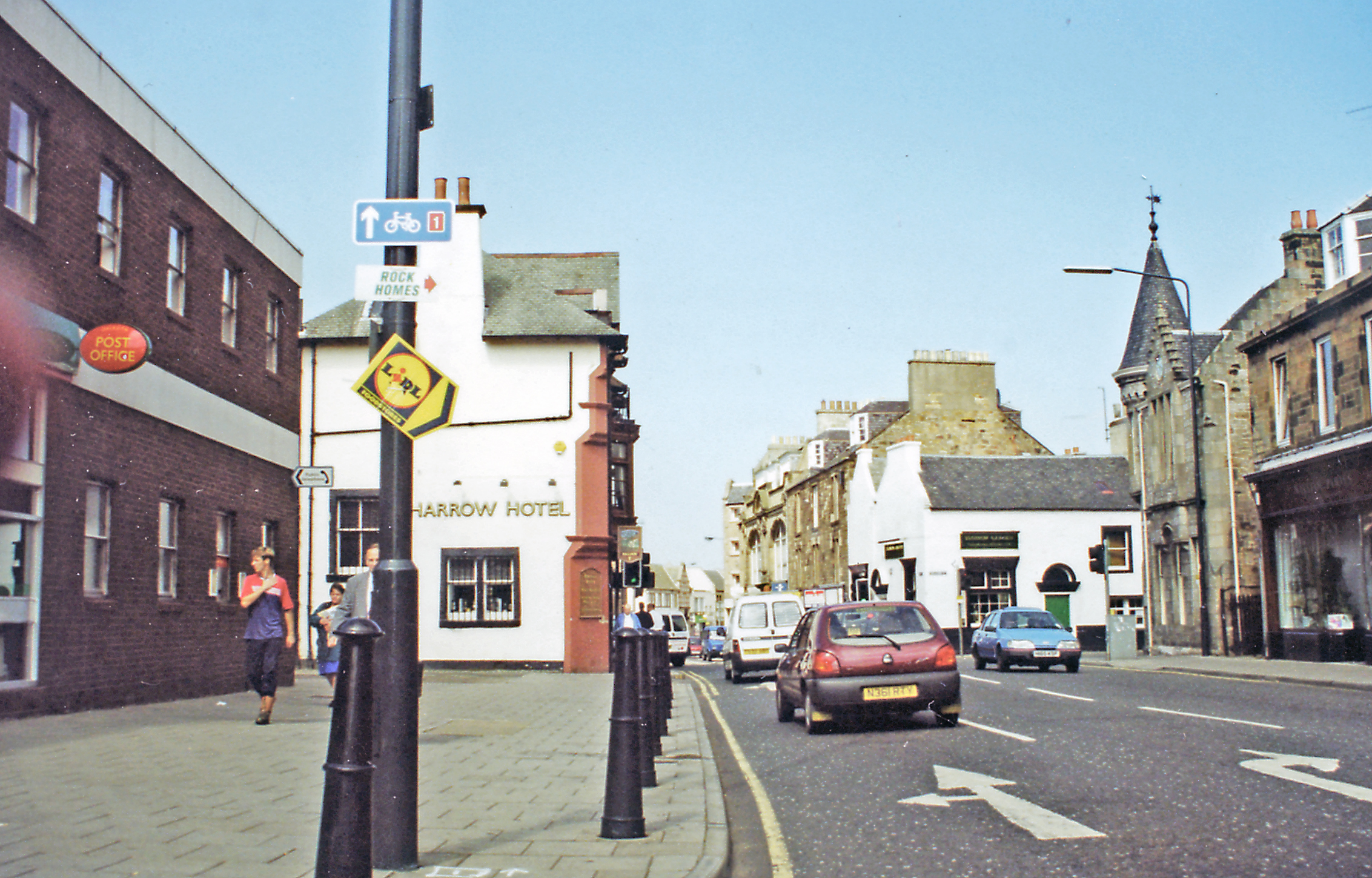
- Dalkeith town centre

General information
- Location: Dalkeith, Midlothian; Scotland
- Coordinates: 55.892792°N 3.073673°W
- Grid reference: NT329671
- Platforms: 2

Other information
- Status: Disused

History
- Original company: Edinburgh and Dalkeith Railway
- Pre-grouping: North British Railway
- Post-grouping: London and North Eastern Railway

Key dates
- 26 November 1838: Opened
- 1 January 1917: Closed
- 1 October 1919: Reopened
- 5 January 1942: Closed to passengers
- 10 August 1964: Closed completely
Location

Dalkeith railway station served the town of Dalkeith, Scotland, from 1838 to 1964 on the Dalkeith branch of the Edinburgh and Dalkeith Railway.

== History ==
The station opened in Autumn 1839, although passenger services may have run from 26 November 1838. It was situated to the west of Eskbank Road. Nearby there was a timber yard and a coal yard; the timber yard was situated to the south and the coal yard was situated to the north of the station. The station closed on 1 January 1917 but reopened on 1 October 1919, before closing permanently to passengers on 5 January 1942 and closing to goods on 10 August 1964.

The nearest station is now at Eskbank.

== The site today ==
Most of the station site is now a Morrisons supermarket. The site was also previously used as a bus depot after the station site was demolished.

Preceding station	Disused railways	Following station
Glenesk; Line and station closed	Edinburgh and Dalkeith Railway	Terminus
