= Polton railway station =

Disused railway station in Polton, Midlothian

Polton

General information
- Location: Polton, Midlothian; Scotland
- Coordinates: 55.8712°N 3.1382°W
- Grid reference: NT288648
- Platforms: 1

Other information
- Status: Disused

History
- Original company: Esk Valley Railway
- Pre-grouping: North British Railway
- Post-grouping: London and North Eastern Railway; British Railways (Scottish Region)

Key dates
- 15 April 1867: Opened
- 10 September 1951: Closed to passengers
- 18 May 1964: Closed completely
Location

Polton railway station served the village of Polton, Midlothian, Scotland from 1867 to 1964 on the Esk Valley Railway.

== History ==
The station opened on 15 April 1867 by the Esk Valley Railway. It was situated on the east side of Polton Road. The moderately sized goods yard had three sidings, one stabling a locomotive when required due to there being no engine shed. There was also a private siding for Springfield Paper Mill to the west of the station. A second private siding served Polton Mill to the north and a third siding served Kevock Mill on the up side of the line. The station closed to passengers on 10 September 1951 and closed to goods traffic, along with the line, on 18 May 1964.

Preceding station	Disused railways	Following station
Lasswade; Line and station closed	North British Railway; Esk Valley Railway	Terminus
