= Fisherrow railway station =

Disused railway station in Fisherrow, East Lothian

Fisherrow

General information
- Location: Fisherrow, East Lothian; Scotland
- Coordinates: 55.9449°N 3.0679°W
- Grid reference: NT334728

Other information
- Status: Disused

History
- Original company: Edinburgh and Dalkeith Railway

Key dates
- 1831: Opened
- 14 July 1847: Closed to passengers
Location

Fisherrow railway station served the harbour of Fisherrow, East Lothian, Scotland from 1831 to 1847 on the Edinburgh and Dalkeith Railway.

== History ==
The station opened in 1831 by the Edinburgh and Dalkeith Railway. To the south was a depot that was originally a coal store but later sold merchandise for Fisherrow Harbour. The station closed to passengers on 14 July 1847.

| Preceding station | Historical railways | Following station |
|---|---|---|
| Niddrie; Line and station closed | North British Railway; Edinburgh and Dalkeith Railway | Terminus |
