= Pencaitland railway station =

Disused railway station in Pencaitland, East Lothian

Pencaitland

General information
- Location: Pencaitland, East Lothian; Scotland
- Coordinates: 55.9073°N 2.9026°W
- Grid reference: NT436686
- Platforms: 1

Other information
- Status: Disused

History
- Original company: North British Railway
- Pre-grouping: North British Railway
- Post-grouping: London and North Eastern Railway

Key dates
- 14 October 1901: Opened
- 3 April 1933: Closed
Location

Pencaitland railway station served the village of Pencaitland, East Lothian, Scotland, from 1901 to 1933 on the Macmerry Branch.

== History ==
The station was opened on 14 October 1901 by the North British Railway. To the north was a goods yard, its two sidings and to the west was a railway cottage. The station closed on 3 April 1933.

Preceding station	Disused railways	Following station
Saltoun; Line and station closed	North British Railway; Macmerry Branch	Ormiston; Line and station closed
