= Sheriffhall railway station =

Disused railway station in Sheriffhall, Midlothian

Sheriffhall
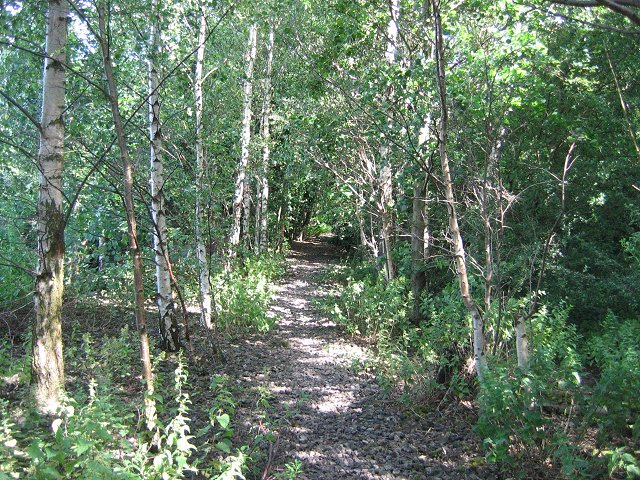
- The site of the station in 2005

General information
- Location: Sheriffhall, Midlothian; Scotland
- Coordinates: 55.898293°N 3.086699°W
- Grid reference: NT321677
- Platforms: 1

Other information
- Status: Disused

History
- Original company: Edinburgh and Dalkeith Railway; North British Railway

Key dates
- March 1844: Opened
- 1849: Closed
Location

Sheriffhall railway station served the village of Sheriffhall, Dalkeith, Scotland, from 1844 to 1849 on the Waverley Route.

== History ==
The station was opened in March 1844 by the Edinburgh and Dalkeith Railway. The station might have been opened earlier, but information on the intermediate timetable was very vague. The station was situated between the A68 bridge and Sheriffhall. The station had a very short lifespan; it was only open for 5 years and it closed down once the North British Railway had taken over the line.

== The site today ==
The rebuilt section of the A6106 between Millerhill and Sheriffhall was opened on 30 March 2015, which means that a new railway, called the Borders Railway, can be opened parallel to the section of the road. The Borders Railway involves 30 miles of a new track with ten stops, 7 being new stations.

Preceding station	Historical railways	Following station
Millerhill; Line closed, station closed	North British Railway; Edinburgh and Dalkeith Railway	Dalkeith; Line partly open, station closed
