= RAF Macmerry =

Former RAF station in East Lothian, Scotland

RAF Macmerry RNAS Macmerry HMS Nighthawk II RAF Tranent RAF Penston
- Macmerry, East Lothian in Scotland

Site information
- Type: Royal Air Force satellite station
- Code: VC
- Owner: Air Ministry; Admiralty
- Operator: Royal Air Force; Royal Navy
- Controlled by: RAF Fighter Command 1941-1942 * No. 13 Group RAF * No. 81 (OTU) Group RAF; RAF Coastal Command 1942-1946; Fleet Air Arm 1945-1946
- Condition: Disused

Location
- Shown within East Lothian RAF Macmerry (the United Kingdom)
- Coordinates: 55°57′02″N 002°53′36″W

Site history
- Built: 1928/29
- In use: 1929 - 1953
- Fate: Farmland / Industry / Leisure / Public road
- Battles/wars: European theatre of World War II

Airfield information
- Elevation: 91 metres (299 ft) AMSL
Runways
Direction	Length and surface
WNW/ESE	1,500 yards (1,372 m) Grass
NE/SW	1,200 yards (1,097 m) Grass
NNW/SSE	1,200 yards (1,097 m) Grass
- Source: Royal Navy Research Archive

Royal Air Force Macmerry or more simply RAF Macmerry is a former Royal Air Force satellite station located 4.5 miles (7.2 km) west of Haddington, East Lothian, Scotland and 11.4 miles (18.3 km) east of Edinburgh. It was situated immediately to the north east of Macmerry on the north side of the A1 road. It has also been called RNAS Macmerry (when used by the Royal Navy) and unofficially RAF Tranent and RAF Penston during its life.

== History ==
A landing ground known as Penston was used by the Royal Flying Corps during the First World War. Subsequently, an adjacent site was developed as Macmerry airfield by the Edinburgh Flying Club, and this was used for scheduled flights by North Eastern Airways from 1936 to 1939. In 1942 Macmerry was expanded to encompass the former Penston site.

Civil flying ceased with the outbreak of the Second World War, and the airfield was taken over by the RAF as a satellite to the nearby fighter station RAF Drem, although its role was soon expanded to other uses. From March 1941 until July 1943 a succession of RAF Army Cooperation Command squadrons were stationed at Macmerry using Blenheim, Lysander and Mustang aircraft. Part of No. 58 Operational Training Unit from RAF Grangemouth used Macmerry for fighter training until April 1942 when RAF Balado Bridge opened as a satellite to Grangemouth. Macmerry was also used as a satellite to the Operational Training Unit at RAF East Fortune - this was initially No. 60 OTU (night-fighter training), and from November 1942 onwards No. 132 OTU (coastal strike and long-range fighter training). Other wartime activities at RAF Macmerry included a works operated by Cunliffe-Owen Aircraft for aircraft repair and modification; a training school for the RAF Regiment and an Elementary Gliding School.

The airfield also continued to function as a satellite to RAF Drem, which had hosted a Royal Navy Fleet Air Arm night fighter training school (784 Naval Air Squadron) since October 1942. Naval use increased in December 1943 when 740 Naval Air Squadron formed at Macmerry, this being a communications squadron which used a variety of aircraft including the de Havilland Dominie, Avro Anson, Fairey Swordfish and Stinson Reliant. As the war in Europe drew to a close the need for home defence fighter stations declined, but the Fleet Air Arm needed more airfields to train aircrew for the war against Japan. Accordingly, both RAF Drem and RAF Macmerry were transferred to the Royal Navy as HMS Nighthawk and HMS Nighthawk II in April and June 1945 respectively. However, the end of the war curtailed the need for naval aircrews and RNAS Macmerry was handed back to the RAF in December 1945. Thereafter military use of RAF Macmerry was limited to the gliding school, which closed in 1946.

In August 1946 the civil airfield was reopened by the Edinburgh Flying Club, but it closed in 1953.

== Units Stationed at Macmerry ==
- No. 13 Squadron RAF during August 1942 with Blenheims
- No. 63 Squadron RAF November 1942-July 1943 with Mustangs
- No. 225 Squadron RAF August 1942-October 1942 with Mustangs
- No. 607 Squadron RAF January 1941-March 1941 with Hurricanes
- No. 614 Squadron RAF March 1941-August 1942 with Blenheims and Lysanders
- 740 Naval Air Squadron December 1943-September 1945 with various aircraft
- Air Firing Squadron of No. 58 Operational Training Unit RAF (OTU) (December 1941 - April 1942)
- Satellite of No. 132 (Coastal) OTU
- No. 3 Gliding School RAF (March 1944 - April 1946)
- No. 1497 (Target Towing) Flight RAF (December 1942 - June 1943)
- No. 1318 Mobile Wing RAF Regiment
- No. 2737 Squadron RAF Regiment
- No. 2830 Squadron RAF Regiment
- No. 2949 Squadron RAF Regiment

== Current use ==
The airfield site is now occupied by agriculture, a go-kart centre and the realigned A1 dual carriageway, whereas the technical and domestic sites are an industrial estate.

== See also ==
- List of former Royal Air Force stations
