= Esk Valley Railway =

Esk Valley Railway may refer to

- Esk Valley Railway (Scotland), former Scottish railway company
- Esk Valley Railway (North Yorkshire), railway line in the Esk Valley, North Yorkshire
