= Broomieknowe railway station =

Disused railway station in Bonnyrigg, Midlothian

Broomieknowe
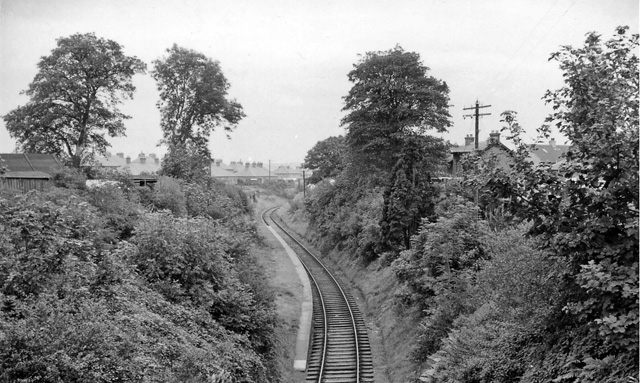
- Remains of the station site, 1962

General information
- Location: Bonnyrigg, Midlothian; Scotland
- Coordinates: 55.8782°N 3.1068°W
- Grid reference: NT308655
- Platforms: 1

Other information
- Status: Disused

History
- Original company: Esk Valley Railway
- Pre-grouping: North British Railway
- Post-grouping: London and North Eastern Railway British Railways (Scottish Region)

Key dates
- 15 April 1867: Opened as Bonnyrigg
- 1 August 1868: Name changed to Broomieknowe
- 1 January 1917: Closed to passengers as a wartime economy measure
- 1 April 1919: Reopened
- 10 September 1951: Closed
Location

Broomieknowe railway station served the town of Bonnyrigg, Midlothian, Scotland from 1867 to 1951 on the Esk Valley Railway.

== History ==
The station opened on 15 April 1867 by the Esk Valley Railway. The station was situated at the end of Leyden Park in front of the Bonnyrigg Health Centre. The station was originally called Bonnyrigg but the name was changed to Broomieknowe on 1 August 1868. The station was closed as a wartime economy measure and lost its passenger service from 1 January 1917. The closure was only temporary unlike other stations and reopened on 1 April 1919. The station never had any goods facilities and closed on 10 September 1951.

The station site has now been replaced by a Health Centre.

Preceding station	Disused railways	Following station
Eskbank; Line closed, station open	North British Railway; Esk Valley Railway	Lasswade; Line and station closed
