= The Smeaton railway branches of the Lothians =

Former railway lines in Scotland

The Smeaton railway branches of the Lothians were a group of railway branches in East Lothian and Midlothian, Scotland, in the area between Dalkeith and Haddington.

The Duke of Buccleuch's Tramway was opened in 1837 from Dalkeith to Smeaton and Cowden; it was a horse drawn waggonway, with a prodigious viaduct, the Victoria Bridge, over the River South Esk.

When the North British Railway purchased and modernised the nearby Edinburgh and Dalkeith Railway, there was a call to modernise Buccleuch's railway too, and this culminated in the Monktonhall, Ormiston and Dalkeith Railway, built by the North British Railway. This ran from Monktonhall Junction, on the Edinburgh to Dunbar main line, to Smeaton. There was an eastward branch from Smeaton to Macmerry and a southerly branch from Smeaton passing Dalkeith to the Hawick line. These lines opened in 1866 - 1869, and passenger trains ran from Macmerry to Edinburgh from 1872.

Finally the Gifford and Garvald Light Railway was opened from Ormiston to Gifford in 1901; it never reached Garvald.

Considerable coal mining activity was taking place around Smeaton and Ormiston, but the remainder of the lines traversed sparsely populated terrain, and the lines were not successful commercially. Closure to passengers took place in 1925 and fully in 1933. Goods closure followed in the 1950s, with short sections retained for colliery access until 1980.

== Untapped coal ==
There were known deposits of coal in the area of East Lothian east and south of Haddington; the heavy mineral needed an efficient transport medium to take it to the point of consumption. The Haddington branch of the North British Railway came close to the locality of the pits, but not close enough. When the North British Railway was being designed, competing proposed railways attempted to include it in their scope, and the Tyne Valley Railway and the East Lothian Railway both included the untapped coal fields, as well as lime for improving soil, and agricultural products, in their prospectuses. Those railways were promoted in the heady days of the 1845 railway mania and they collapsed as the bubble was burst the following year.

== Dalkeith ==
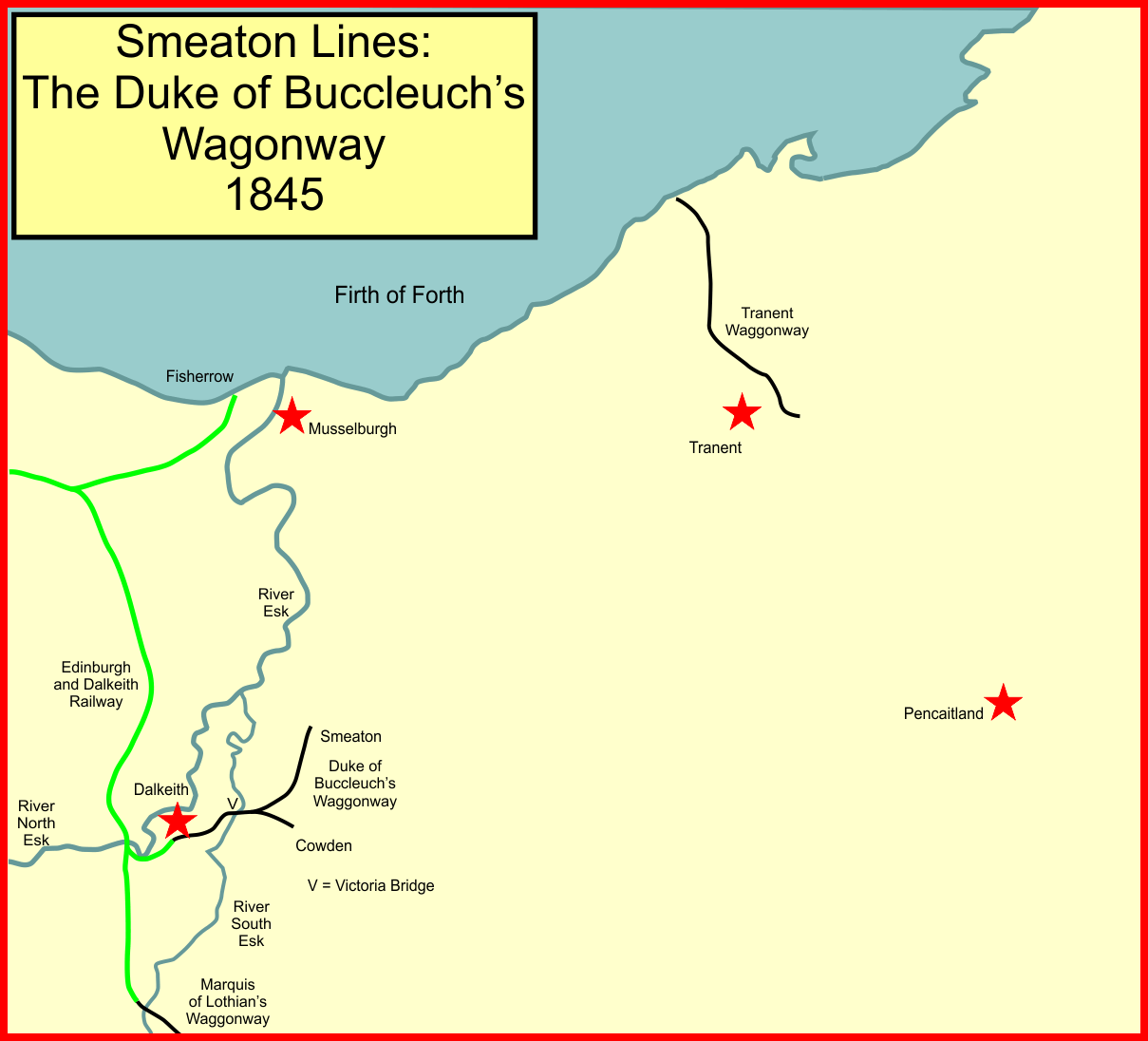
The railways to Dalkeith and Smeaton in 1845

A tramway already connected some of the coal deposits at the western margin of the coalfield (partly in Midlothian): the Duke of Buccleuch had constructed a 4 feet 6 inches gauge tramway that extended from the Dalkeith branch of the Edinburgh and Dalkeith Railway (which was also built to that gauge, and was horse operated). His tramway opened in 1837 and involved a prodigious viaduct crossing of the South Esk:

The Dalkeith branch, which is the exclusive property of His Grace the Duke of Buccleuch, and was intended solely for the benefit of that town, was opened in the end of 1838. However desirable, it seemed, for some time, impracticable to extend this branch to His Grace's coal-fields, in the neighbourhood of Cowden. But these obstacles were soon surmounted; the intervening properties were purchased, and a magnificent viaduct had been erected at great expense over the vale of the South Esk. The bridge consists of six arches; the two arches at the extremities of the bridge are each of 110 feet span; and the four intermediate arches are each of 120 feet span. The arches are built of the best Dantzick timber, and rest upon stone piers of hewn ashlar. The height, from the ordinary water-mark, to the road-way, is 78 feet; the whole length is 830 feet; and the entire width of road-way between the railings is 14 feet. The whole structure is of the most tasteful architecture, and imparts a highly picturesque character to the surrounding scenery.

Buccleuch's tramway ran from the Dalkeith station of the Edinburgh and Dalkeith Railway, running east through the streets of Dalkeith, crossing the present day Buccleuch Street and Newmills Road diagonally to the location of the Elmfield ironworks of William Mushet. It then turned north-east to the South Esk Bridge, named Victoria Bridge; it was immediately south of the present-day Musselburgh Road bridge. The tramway then forked, running south-east to serve Cowden coalpit, and north to Smeaton Colliery (belonging to the Marquis of Lothian) and Smeaton Brick Works.

== Edinburgh and Dalkeith upgraded ==
In 1845 the Edinburgh and Dalkeith Railway (E&DR) was sold to the North British Railway (NBR), which had not yet opened any of its lines. The NBR wanted to build a line from Edinburgh to Carlisle, and acquiring the E&DR line and upgrading it to main line standards was a first step. The upgrading included conversion to standard gauge; the Duke of Buccleuch did not convert his line, so that a break of gauge was created at Dalkeith, requiring transshipment of loads there.

The operation of the former Edinburgh and Dalkeith Railway as a modern main line with steam traction emphasised the obsolete technology of the duke's line, and ideas of modernisation began to take hold. As the North British Railway became the dominant railway company in the district, it fell to them to propose the work.

== The Monktonhall, Ormiston and Dalkeith Railway ==
They did so in the 1862 session of Parliament, when they put forward not an upgrade of Buccleuch's line, but a new railway from Monktonhall to Hardengreen Junction on the line to Hawick. It was referred to as the Monktonhall, Ormiston and Dalkeith Railway. It would pass through Smeaton and skirt the south-eastern margin of Dalkeith; and it would have a branch line eastwards from Smeaton to Ormiston. The residents of Dalkeith had long felt aggrieved at being on a branch line from the main line, and this did something to assuage their feelings. More importantly, the line connected several areas of colliery workings.

It was described in the bill as consisting of two branches:

The first commenced at a point on the main line... called Monktonhall. Thence it passed to Smeaton, a farm on the estate of the Duke of Buccleuch, where there were tileworks, and from that point it ran up the valley of the Tyne, opening up a very rich agricultural district. Passing a great number of coal-pits, it proceeded eastward to Pencaitland, where there was a congregation of coal-works, and it then turned northward to a blast-furnace, at a place called Macmerry, where it terminated. The second branch commenced at Smeaton, where it joined the first, and ran southward to Hardengreen, on the Hawick branch of the North British Railway. At the present time there were 50,000 tons of goods annually coming off the North British main line from East Lothian, passing on to the Hawick branch and so proceeding southwards.

There seemed to be no opposition to the line locally, and the North British Railway were surprised to find objections to the proposal from Andrew and John Wauchope. (Note: Ross refers on page 57 to Sir John Don Wauchope and Mr Dick. Sir John later became a prominent shareholder of the North British Railway.) The men were brothers, and they owned extensive estates near Niddrie and Edmondstone. John Wauchope had been the owner of the Edmonston (or Edmondstone) Railway, opened 1818, and their estates had been crossed by the Edinburgh and Dalkeith Railway, which superseded the Edmondstone Railway. As a result, they received a tonnage toll for traffic crossing their lands. They now argued that the Monktonhall line was promoted to deprive them of their rightful income, and they petitioned Parliament.

Only two petitioners appeared against the bill-- the Messrs Wauchope. Neither of these gentlemen had an inch of ground upon the proposed lines... Their claim originated many years ago, in connection with the horse tramway between Edinburgh and Dalkeith... [Their counsel contended] that the real object of the bill was, not to accommodate the public, but to get rid of the toll payable to his clients by diverting the traffic to another and more circuitous route.

The NBR naturally argued their line was simply a means of accommodating public demand, but they saw that the mood was against them, and the following week it was announced that

The North British Railway had come to the following agreement with the Messrs Wauchope: That the sum of £1,000 annually should be paid to each of those gentlemen [as compensation]... The arrangement was to be embodied in an agreement, and also in a clause to be introduced in the present or some other bill of the North British Railway Company.

The North British Railway (Branches) Act 1862 (25 & 26 Vict. c. xlix) received royal assent on 3 June 1862; the lines were now described as the Monktonhall branch (from Smeaton to Monktonhall Junction); the Ormiston branch (from Smeaton to Macmerry); and the Dalkeith branch from Smeaton to Hardengreen Junction. Smeaton was no more than a farmstead, but now it was to be the hub of these lines. The final part of the Ormiston branch, approaching Macmerry, ran alongside an earlier tram road that ran from Pencaitland Colliery to the coast. The Dalkeith branch included the obligation to acquire the Duke of Buccleuch's tramway, and it may be that the original intention was simply to upgrade parts of it. There was some delay before work started, possibly because of negotiations with Buccleuch and a possible redesign, but in 1865 construction started; this included a new bridge structure over the South Esk.

The people of Dalkeith petitioned the North British Railway at this point for the line to be made double track. Initial designs had shown this but the NBR had scaled them back. The petitioners were apparently mollified by a promise that the line would be doubled when the traffic increased so as to require it.

Work was progressing on the South Esk bridge; the earlier tram road piers were used and built up after the timber arches were removed. A lattice girder superstructure was erected.

=== Opening ===
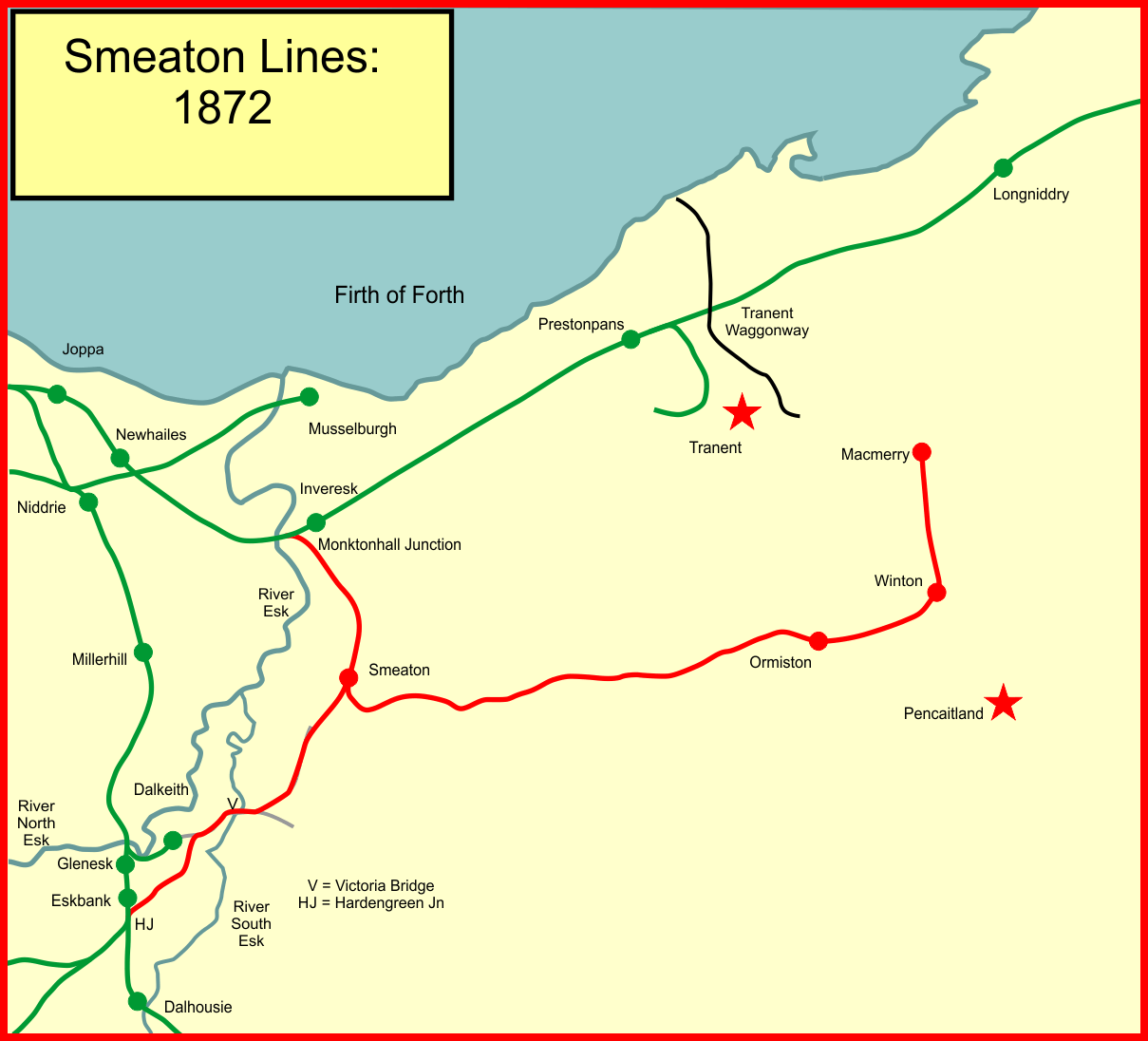
The Smeaton lines in 1872

The first section of the line, from Monktonhall Junction to Thornleybank (just east of Dalkeith) was opened to goods and mineral traffic on 23 December 1866. As the contractor was still working on parts of the line elaborate working instructions were published to avoid a collision between the daily service train and the contractor's works.

On 1 May 1867 the Macmerry branch was opened as far as Ormiston, and the entire Macmerry branch was opened on 19 March 1869. The new Victoria bridge was of course the delaying factor in opening through to Dalkeith and Hardengreen Junction, but this was accomplished on 31 July 1870.

As yet no passenger trains were running; it was not until 1872 that passenger trains from Macmerry to Edinburgh started running, from 1 May; there were three trains a day, six days a week. The section from Smeaton to Hardengreen Junction was very sparsely used, and the North British gave up on the idea of running passenger trains there. The original aim was to run freight trains towards Carlisle from East Lothian, but after initial enthusiasm, it seems that traffic estimates were inadequate. Similarly, as the route faced from Dalkeith towards Peebles, the line was inconvenient in supporting any significant traffic flow. (Note: Some through excursion trains traversed the route.) Traffic from Dalkeith to Edinburgh was already served directly over the original E&DR line to Niddrie. In 1896 the sole intermediate signal box between Smeaton and Hardengreen Junction, at Thorneybank, was abolished. The local heavy industry declined as it was concentrated at other centres, and mineral traffic all but vanished on this southern section.

== Gifford and Garvald ==
Ever since the Haddington branch had been opened in 1846, discussion had taken place about an extension southwards from there. The station was inconveniently located beyond the edge of the town, but any alteration to bring the station to the town centre would preclude a later through line, which the community still expected. These discussions cropped up repeatedly, until in 1889 a Haddington and Gifford Railway was definitely proposed. Even this faded away but it gave rise to a new scheme to connect Gifford to the railway network at Ormiston instead: the Gifford and Garvald Railway. Leaving Ormiston, it was to make a loop south of West Saltoun and run north between that place and East Saltoun, then running east to Gifford and on to Garvald. The railway was to be independently promoted, but the North British Railway were friendly towards it, agreeing (in April 1891) to work it for 50% of gross receipts and guaranteeing 4% on the share capital, but declining to subscribe for shares.

The promoters got their act of Parliament on 3 July 1891, the Gifford and Garvald Railway Act 1891 (54 & 55 Vict. c. lxxxv); capital was to be £110,000. However it immediately proved impossible to raise the capital required, but G. B. Wieland, secretary of the North British Railway arranged to become secretary of the Gifford and Garvald Railway too, and generated considerable conflict with the board by driving forward his personal view of the future of the line. Matters escalated and Wieland arranged a coup against several of the directors; they went to the Court of Session which found against Wieland, but when the directors then approached a contractor who had offered to finance the work himself in exchange for shares, he had been coerced by Wieland and his North British colleagues to decline to deal with them. (Note: Hajducki's view of the events. Ross, writing a history of the North British, takes a different view: the reason was frustration with the local directors negotiating "with themselves" over land acquisition. But the action was "extraordinarily high-handed and a blatant breach of company law; the next time Wieland organised a coup, his groundwork was much better".)

A deviation of the authorised route of the line was proposed, by which it would pass south of East Saltoun in a large southerly loop. No rational reason is recorded for the change (Note: Although i would have involved a stiff gradient between the two Saltouns.) and it seems likely that this was connected with lucrative land transfers by the new directors. The deviation obtained sanction in the Gifford and Garvald Railway Act 1893 (56 & 57 Vict. c. cc) in the 1893 session (on 24 August), (Note: Carter; Ross says 2 June.) and the Garvald portion was now omitted.

An extremely unsavoury episode then followed of two warring factions on the board, with considerable adoption of tactical attitudes over directors' commitment to take shares. Wieland and his supporters won, and the original directors reluctantly took their subscribed shares. However the available capital still fell considerably short of the sum required to start building the line.

=== Light railway legislation ===
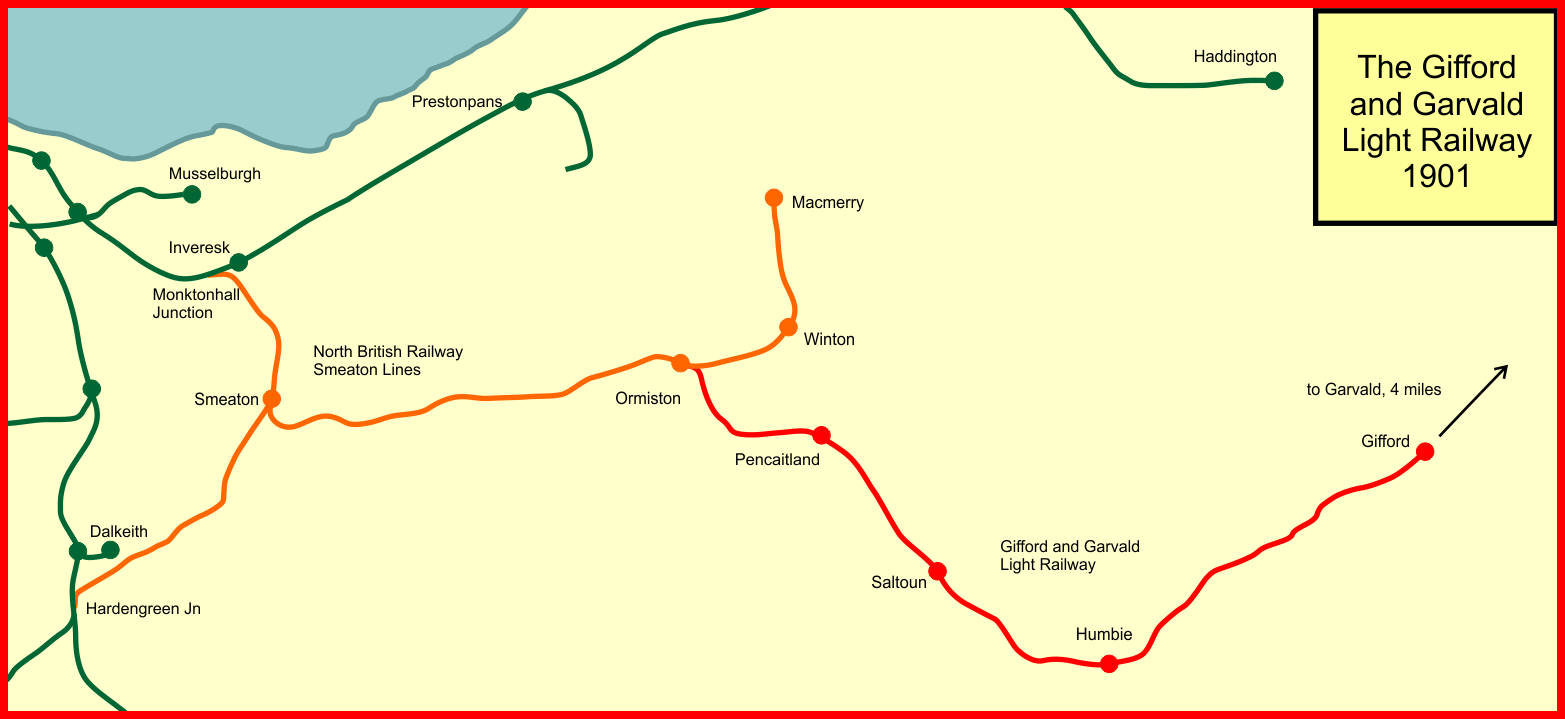
The Smeaton lines in 1901 after the opening of the Gifford line

The Light Railways Act 1896 was enacted to permit lower-cost construction of railways where profitability was marginal under normal conditions, and the directors of the Gifford and Garvald considered whether this would assist their line. They decided that it did and made the necessary application, which was granted in the Gifford and Garvald Light Railway Order 1898 of 14 July 1898. The original Gifford and Garvald Railway Act 1891 was modified in respect of the North British Railway obligation in working the line: a fixed rent of £300 per month was now payable. A contractor undertook to build the line for the entire capital of £88,000. There were to be two large bridges, a three-arch bridge over the Tyne and a considerable viaduct over the Humbie Water.

The line was built to minimal standards, but as construction was nearing completion, the North British Railway indicated a number of demands, including an intermediate crossing place on the line, and signalling more sophisticated than one engine in steam.

=== Opening to Gifford ===
The line between Ormiston and Gifford opened to special trains on 12 October 1901, and fully to the public on 14 October. It had cost £99,330. The passenger train service consisted of two return trips daily, which ran through to and from Edinburgh. The journey was very slow, and trainmen had to open and close level crossing gates intermediately themselves.

The financial performance of the line was predictably poor, £29 (in passenger fares) per week being taken at the stations at first. The losers were the North British Railway, who had undertaken to pay £300 per month to the company, and the contractor Philips, who had £100,000 of shares but no cash. Philips eventually sold his shares, at a considerable loss, to a London agent.

There was never any serious attempt to revive the idea of continuing to Garvald.

== The twentieth century ==
Output from the Lothian coalfield increased considerably around the turn of the century, in step with developments in Fife. The branch between Monktonhall Junction and Smeaton was doubled to cope with the traffic; the work was completed in December 1912.

A request was received from Woodhall Coal Company for a colliers' platform to be provided at their Tyneholm Colliery near Pencaitland; their work was increasing and they could not otherwise get enough workers to the location. Woodhall Colliery Company Platform opened on 1 July 1907, although no trains (legally) called there until after the Board of Trade inspection on 16 July. Major Pringle noted that "No nameboard has been provided as the platform will not be advertised in Bradshaw". A train ran from Macmerry to the platform and then continued empty to Gifford, where it formed the first ordinary train of the day.

In fact the regular service was discontinued from 18 November 1907, although occasional use took place after that date, by the colliery manager personally on a request basis, possibly until 1930.

The village of Cousland was close to the line between Smeaton and Ormiston, and the residents asked the North British to give them a passenger station. This was agreed to, and the station, called Crossgatehall Halt, opened on 1 August 1913; the descriptor "Halt" indicated that there were no goods facilities at the station. 5,000 passengers were booked from the Halt in the first full year, compared with only 2,800 at the established station at Smeaton in the same year.

During World War I manpower was in short supply and a number of economising closures took place. The Smeaton to Hardengreen section of line, which had failed to thrive, was closed temporarily. Although the section reopened after 1918, the closure was reapplied on 11 November 1934, with stubs at each end being used for wagon storage and other operational purposes. The superstructure of the Victoria Viaduct was removed in 1940.

In 1923 the railways of Great Britain were grouped under the Railways Act 1921, and the North British Railway and the Gifford and Garvald Railway were subsumed into the new London and North Eastern Railway (LNER). The Gifford shareholders had not done badly, and received £90,000 of LNER stock for their £100,000 investment.

In this period however, competition from road transport became serious, especially passenger transport by bus. Passenger carryings on the railway declined steeply and the LNER looked for economies. They were not hard to find, and the Macmerry branch closed to passengers from 1 July 1925. This left the line between Monktonhall Junction and Ormiston via Smeaton still open for the Gifford branch, but Smeaton station and Crossgatehall Halt were closed from 22 September 1930, and at the beginning of 1933 the section from Saltoun to Gifford was made one engine in steam.

This did little to stem the losses and on 3 April 1933 the Gifford branch from Ormiston was closed to passengers.

Nationalisation of the railways followed the end of World War II, and the lines were now under the control of the Scottish Region of British Railways.

In August 1948 torrential rain fell over several successive days in the Lothians and Berwickshire, and the goods-only Gifford line was breached by the collapse of the Gilchriston bridge on 12 August; the line was temporarily blocked beyond that point. (The temporary closure in fact became permanent.) Gifford station remained open for handling goods traffic, which was carted by road to or from Haddington.

Goods traffic generally was declining, but mineral traffic in the western part of the Smeaton network was still doing well, but in the latter part of the 1950s that traffic too declined, and following the closure of Carberry Colliery, the Macmerry branch was closed east of the Winton mine connection, on 2 May 1960. On the same day the Gifford branch was cut back to Saltoun. However Winton mine ceased production in 1961 and the stub of the Macmerry branch then closed as well. On 25 May 1965 the entire network east of Smeaton was closed completely

This left only the line from Monktonhall Junction to Dalkeith Colliery (a short distance south of Smeaton). That line was singled on 1 February 1973. Dalkeith Colliery ceased production in December 1978, leaving only a coal washery at the site. When that too closed in 1980, the railway closed as well, on 31 December 1980.

== Topography ==
Locations on the line were:

- Monktonhall Junction; line diverged from main line to Dunbar;
- Carberry Colliery;
- Smeaton; opened 1 May 1872; closed 22 September 1930;
- Crossgatehall Halt; opened 1 August 1913; closed 1 January 1917; reopened 1 February 1919; closed 22 September 1930;
- Ormiston; opened 1 May 1872; closed 3 April 1933;
- Winton; opened July 1872; closed 1 July 1925;
- Macmerry; opened 1 May 1872; closed 1 July 1925.

- Ormiston; above;
- Woodhall Colliery Company Platform; colliers only; opened 1 July 1907; reduced to request stop only November 1907; closed 1930;
- Pencaitland; opened 14 October 1901; closed 3 April 1933;
- Saltoun; opened 14 October 1901; closed 3 April 1933;
- Humbie; opened 14 October 1901; closed 3 April 1933;
- Gifford; opened 14 October 1901; closed 3 April 1933.

- Smeaton; above;
- Thorneybank Siding;
- Hardengreen Junction; converged with Hawick line.
