= Macmerry railway station =

Disused railway station in Macmerry, East Lothian

Macmerry

General information
- Location: Macmerry, East Lothian; Scotland
- Coordinates: 55.9405°N 2.9127°W
- Grid reference: NT430723
- Platforms: 1

Other information
- Status: Disused

History
- Original company: North British Railway
- Pre-grouping: North British Railway
- Post-grouping: London and North Eastern Railway

Key dates
- 1 May 1872: Opened
- 1 July 1925: Closed
Location

Macmerry railway station served the village of Macmerry, East Lothian, Scotland, from 1872 to 1925 on the Macmerry Branch.

== History ==
The station was opened on 1 May 1872 by the North British Railway. It was also known as Macmerry Gladsmuir in the handbook of stations. On the south end was the station building and the signal box and to the south of the platform was the goods yard as well as its sidings. Also to the south was a mineral line which served Merryfield, Engine, Bald and Dander pits. The mineral line closed in 1907 and was replaced by a new one, which was to the east and served Penston Colliery and Penston Briar Pit. The station closed on 1 July 1925.

Preceding station	Disused railways	Following station
Terminus	North British Railway; Macmerry Branch	Winton; Line and station closed
