= Millerhill railway station =

Disused railway station in Millerhill, Midlothian

Millerhill
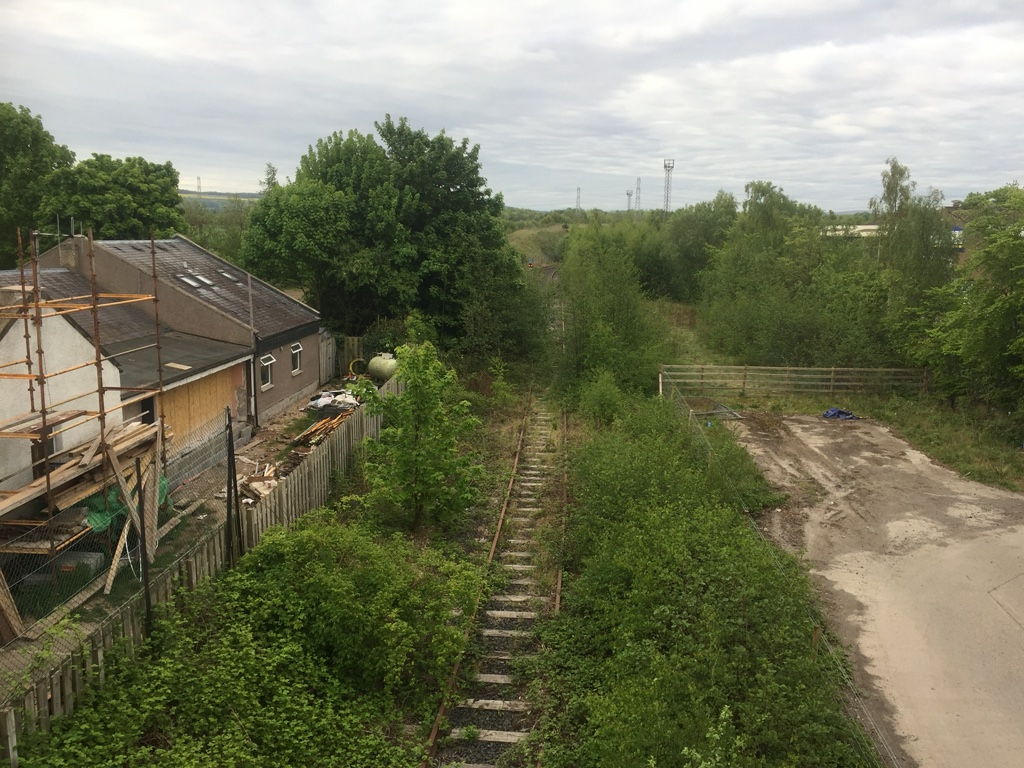
- The site of the station in 2020

General information
- Location: Millerhill, Midlothian; Scotland
- Coordinates: 55.9148°N 3.079°W
- Grid reference: NT326696
- Platforms: 3

Other information
- Status: Disused

History
- Pre-grouping: North British Railway
- Post-grouping: LNER

Key dates
- 1 September 1847: Opened
- 7 November 1955: Closed to passengers
- 25 January 1965: Closed completely
Location

Millerhill railway station served the village of Millerhill, Scotland, from 1847 to 1965 on the Waverley Route.

== History ==
The station opened on 1 September 1847 by the North British Railway. Nearby was Millerhill Marshalling Yard (still open), which is situated south of Edinburgh, on the other side of the A1 from Musselburgh. From 1877 until 1933 it was the junction of a branch to Glencorse. The station closed to passengers on 7 November 1955 and to goods traffic on 25 January 1965.

== The site today ==
The only remains of the station today are the station building and the single track that ran through the station, which is also part of the south end of Millerhill Marshalling Yard.

Preceding station	Historical railways	Following station
Cairney; Line and station closed	North British Railway; Waverley Route	Sheriffhall; Line and station closed
Terminus	North British Railway	Gilmerton; Line and station closed
