= Niddrie railway station =

Disused railway station in Niddrie, Edinburgh

Niddrie

General information
- Location: Niddrie, Edinburgh; Scotland
- Coordinates: 55.9347°N 3.0948°W
- Grid reference: NT317718

Other information
- Status: Disused

History
- Original company: Edinburgh and Dalkeith Railway
- Pre-grouping: North British Railway

Key dates
- June 1843: Opened
- October 1847: Closed
- 1 June 1860: Reopened
- 1 October 1860: Closed again
- 1 December 1864: Reopened again
- January 1869: Closed to passengers
- 1950: Closed to goods
- 2002: New station Newcraighall railway station opened near the site of the station.
Location

Niddrie railway station served the suburb of Niddrie, Edinburgh, Scotland from 1843 to 1950 on the Edinburgh and Dalkeith Railway.

== History ==
The station opened in June 1843 by the Edinburgh and Dalkeith Railway. It was situated on the north side of New Craig Hall Road on the A6095. The station closed in October 1847 when the line closed for re-gauging. The line to Fisherrow was closed at this time. It reopened on 1 June 1860, closing again four months later on 1 October 1860. It reopened again on 1 December 1864 but closed to passengers for the third and last time in January 1869. The station stayed open for goods traffic until 1950.

Preceding station	Historical railways	Following station
St Leonards (Edinburgh); Line and station closed	North British Railway; Edinburgh and Dalkeith Railway	Fisherrow; Line and station closed
