= Winton railway station, Scotland =

Disused railway station in New Winton, East Lothian

Winton
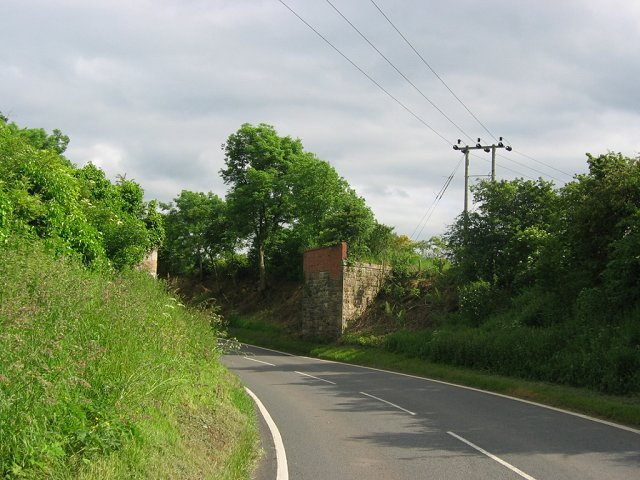
- The site of the railway in 2005

General information
- Location: New Winton, East Lothian; Scotland
- Coordinates: 55.92251°N 2.90964°W
- Platforms: 2

Other information
- Status: Disused

History
- Original company: North British Railway
- Pre-grouping: North British Railway
- Post-grouping: London and North Eastern Railway

Key dates
- 1 May 1872: Opened
- 1 July 1925: Closed
Location

Winton railway station served the village of New Winton, East Lothian, Scotland, from 1872 to 1925 on the Macmerry Branch.

== History ==
The station was opened on 1 May 1872 by the North British Railway. On the west platform was the station building, on the east side was the goods yard and on the north side was the signal box. The station closed on 1 July 1925.

Preceding station	Disused railways	Following station
Macmerry; Line and station closed	North British Railway; Macmerry Branch	Ormiston; Line and station closed
