= Glenesk railway station =

Disused railway station in Glenesk, Midlothian

Glenesk
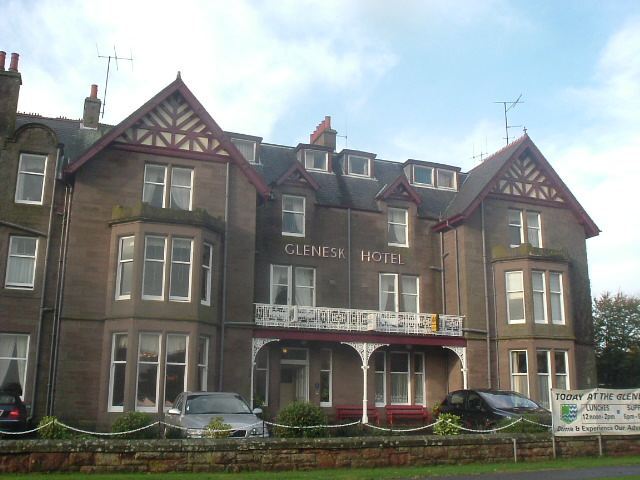
- The site of the station, now occupied by a hotel, in 2005

General information
- Location: Glenesk, Midlothian; Scotland
- Coordinates: 55.8914°N 3.0828°W
- Grid reference: NT323670
- Platforms: 2

Other information
- Status: Disused

History
- Original company: North British Railway
- Pre-grouping: North British Railway

Key dates
- October 1855: Opened
- 1 November 1874: Closed
Location

Glenesk railway station served the village of Glenesk, Midothian, Scotland, from 1855 to 1874 on the Dalkeith branch of the Waverley Route.

== History ==
The station was opened in 1855 by the North British Railway and it was listed as Glenesk Junction in some timetables. It was located as a junction on the Waverley Line with the Dalkeith branch. There were no goods facilities, but there were private sidings located to the north of the station which served Glenesk Colliery Railway. The tracks went over the Glenesk Viaduct, which is still open today. The station closed on 1 November 1874, although it was classed as an unadvertised use until 1886.

Preceding station	Historical railways	Following station
Sheriffhall; Line open, station closed	North British Railway; Waverley Route	Dalkeith; Line and station closed
Sheriffhall; Line open, station closed	North British Railway; Waverley Route	Lasswade Road; Line open, station closed
