= Crossgatehall Halt railway station =

Disused railway station in Crossgatehall, East Lothian

Coordinates: 55.9094°N 3.0139°W

Crossgatehall Halt

General information
- Location: Crossgatehall, East Lothian; Scotland
- Platforms: 1

Other information
- Status: Disused

History
- Original company: North British Railway
- Pre-grouping: North British Railway
- Post-grouping: London and North Eastern Railway

Key dates
- 1 August 1913: Opened
- 1 January 1917: Temporarily closed
- 1 February 1919: Reopened
- 22 September 1930: Closed
Location

Crossgatehall Halt railway station served the Dalkeith Colliery pits in the hamlet of Crossgatehall, East Lothian, Scotland, from 1913 to 1930 on the Macmerry Branch.

== History ==
The station was opened on 1 August 1913 by the North British Railway. Opposite the platform was Dalkeith Colliery signal box, which opened a year before the station. The station closed on 1 January 1917 but reopened on 1 February 1919, before closing permanently on 22 September 1930. The railway cottage to the north survives, although in a heavily modified state.

Preceding station	Disused railways	Following station
Ormiston; Line and station closed	North British Railway; Macmerry Branch	Smeaton; Line and station closed
