= Lasswade railway station =

Disused railway station in Lasswade, Midlothian

Lasswade

General information
- Location: Lasswade, Midlothian; Scotland
- Coordinates: 55.8798°N 3.1165°W
- Grid reference: NT302657
- Platforms: 1

Other information
- Status: Disused

History
- Original company: Esk Valley Railway
- Pre-grouping: North British Railway
- Post-grouping: LNER; British Railways (Scottish Region)

Key dates
- 12 October 1868: Opened
- 10 September 1951: Closed to passengers
- 18 May 1964: Closed completely
Location

Lasswade railway station served the village of Lasswade, Midlothian, Scotland from 1868 to 1964 on the Esk Valley Railway.

== History ==
The station opened on 12 October 1868 by the Esk Valley Railway. The station was situated at the end of Westmill Road. There was a moderate sized goods yard which was accessed from the west and consisted of four short sidings, one running behind the platform and going into a stone-built goods shed. Lasswade gas works was north of the goods shed, with St Leonards paper mill being a short distance to the north along Westmill Road. Access to the yard was controlled by the signal box, which was behind the platform near its west end. This signal box was closed in the 1930s. The station closed to passengers on 10 September 1951 but goods yard remained open until closed along with the line on 18 May 1964.

Preceding station	Disused railways	Following station
Broomieknowe; Line and station closed	North British Railway; Esk Valley Railway	Polton; Line and station closed
