= Newtongrange railway station =

Railway station in Midlothian, Scotland

Newtongrange
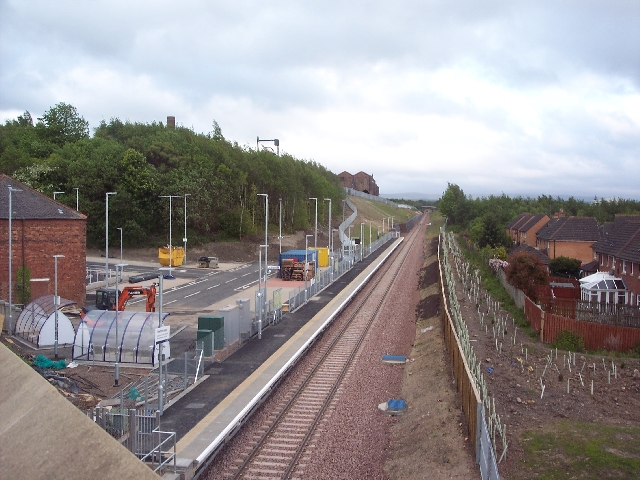

General information
- Location: Newtongrange, Midlothian; Scotland
- Coordinates: 55°51′53″N 3°04′08″W
- Grid reference: NT331642
- Owner: Network Rail
- Manager: ScotRail
- Platforms: 1

Other information
- Station code: NEG

Key dates
- 1 August 1908: Opened
- 6 January 1969: Closed
- 6 September 2015: Resited and reopened

Passengers
- 2020/21: ▼13,864
- 2021/22: ▲75,582
- 2022/23: ▲0.115 million
- 2023/24: ▲0.153 million
- 2024/25: ▼0.150 million
Location
- Location within Midlothian
Notes
- Passenger statistics from the Office of Rail and Road

Newtongrange is a railway station on the Borders Railway, which runs between Edinburgh Waverley and Tweedbank. The station, situated 11 miles 77 chains (19 km) south-east of Edinburgh Waverley, serves the town of Newtongrange in Midlothian, Scotland. It is owned by Network Rail and managed by ScotRail.

== History ==
The station was previously closed (along with the Waverley Route) in 1969. The station reopened, to the south of the original, on 6 September 2015. On 9 September 2015 the Queen and Prince Philip stopped off in Newtongrange station to unveil a plaque to officially open the station. The new construction work was undertaken by BAM Nuttall.

The station also directly serves the National Mining Museum Scotland.

== Services ==
As of the December 2022 timetable change, the station is served by a half-hourly service between Edinburgh Waverley and Tweedbank during the daytime, with an hourly service in the evenings (Monday to Saturday) and on Sundays. All services are operated by ScotRail.

Rolling stock used: Class 158 Express Sprinter and Class 170 Turbostar

Preceding station	National Rail	Following station
Eskbank	ScotRail; Borders Railway	Gorebridge
	Historical railways	
Dalhousie	North British Railway; Waverley Route	Gorebridge
