= Polton =

Coordinates: 55.867°N 3.133°W

- Location within Midlothian
- OS grid reference: NT290642
- Civil parish: Lasswade
- Council area: Midlothian
- Lieutenancy area: Midlothian
- Country: Scotland
- Sovereign state: United Kingdom
- Post town: LASSWADE
- Postcode district: EH18
- Dialling code: 0131
- Police: Scotland
- Fire: Scottish
- Ambulance: Scottish
- UK Parliament: Midlothian
- Scottish Parliament: Midlothian North and Musselburgh

Polton is a village located in Lasswade parish, Midlothian, Scotland, anciently a superiority of the Ramsay family, cadets of Dalhousie. In 1618 David Ramsay of Polton was in possession. (See: Analecta Scotica, Edinburgh, 1834).

The village formerly had two paper mills.

Polton railway station was part of the Esk Valley Railway. The station closed in 1964.

== Notable residents ==
- Thomas de Quincey the English writer, lived here in the latter part of his life, until his death in 1859.
- Charles Thomas Clough an eminent geologist, lived at St Ann's Mount, Polton with his family
