= Saltoun railway station =

Disused railway station in Saltoun, East Lothian

Saltoun

General information
- Location: Saltoun, East Lothian; Scotland
- Coordinates: 55.8889°N 2.8742°W
- Grid reference: NT454669
- Platforms: 2

Other information
- Status: Disused

History
- Original company: North British Railway
- Pre-grouping: North British Railway
- Post-grouping: London and North Eastern Railway

Key dates
- 14 October 1901: Opened
- 3 April 1933: Closed
Location

Saltoun railway station served the villages of East Saltoun and West Saltoun in East Lothian, Scotland, from 1901 to 1933 on the Macmerry Branch.

== History ==
The station was opened on 14 October 1901 by the North British Railway. By the level crossing was the station building and to the west was the goods yard, which had two sidings and a loading bank. The yard carried whisky bottles from the nearby Glenkinchie distillery. It also had a signal box from 1901 to 1956. The station closed on 3 April 1933.

Preceding station	Disused railways	Following station
Humbie; Line and station closed	North British Railway; Macmerry Branch	Pencaitland; Line and station closed
