= Edinburgh Flying Club =

Edinburgh Flying Club (EFC) was a flying club based at Edinburgh Airport, Scotland. The club was formed in 1934, and was originally based at Macmerry Airfield in East Lothian. EFC was registered with the Civil Aviation Authority to train student pilots for Private Pilot (PPL) or National Private Pilot (NPPL) licences. It also provided trial flights, enabling anyone to handle the controls of an aircraft in flight. The club operated four aircraft; a two-seater Piper Tomahawk, and three four-seaters: a Piper Archer, Piper Warrior and Cessna 172.

In February 2016, EFC announced that it would cease flight operations by 31 March 2016, citing multiple factors.
