= Dalhousie railway station =

Disused railway station in Bonnyrigg, Midlothian

Dalhousie

General information
- Location: Bonnyrigg, Midlothian; Scotland
- Coordinates: 55.8739°N 3.0811°W
- Grid reference: NT324650
- Platforms: 2

Other information
- Status: Disused

History
- Original company: Edinburgh and Dalkeith Railway
- Pre-grouping: Edinburgh and Dalkeith Railway; North British Railway

Key dates
- 2 June 1832: Opened
- 1 August 1908: Closed
Location

Dalhousie railway station served the town of Bonnyrigg, Midlothian, Scotland, from 1832 to 1908 on the Waverley Route.

== History ==
The station opened on 2 June 1832, by the Edinburgh and Dalkeith Railway. The station was situated on the north side of an unnamed road to Dalhousie Mains. The line was originally intended for goods traffic but there were never any services. The tracks went over the Dalhousie Viaduct but they were deemed too narrow so it was demolished and replaced by the Newbattle Viaduct.

In September 2015, the Waverley Route partially reopened as part of the Borders Railway. Although the railway passes through the original Dalhousie station, it was not reopened.

Preceding station	Historical railways	Following station
Eskbank; Line open, station open	North British Railway; Waverley Route	Newtongrange; Line open, station open
