= Humbie railway station =

Disused railway station in Humbie, East Lothian

Humbie
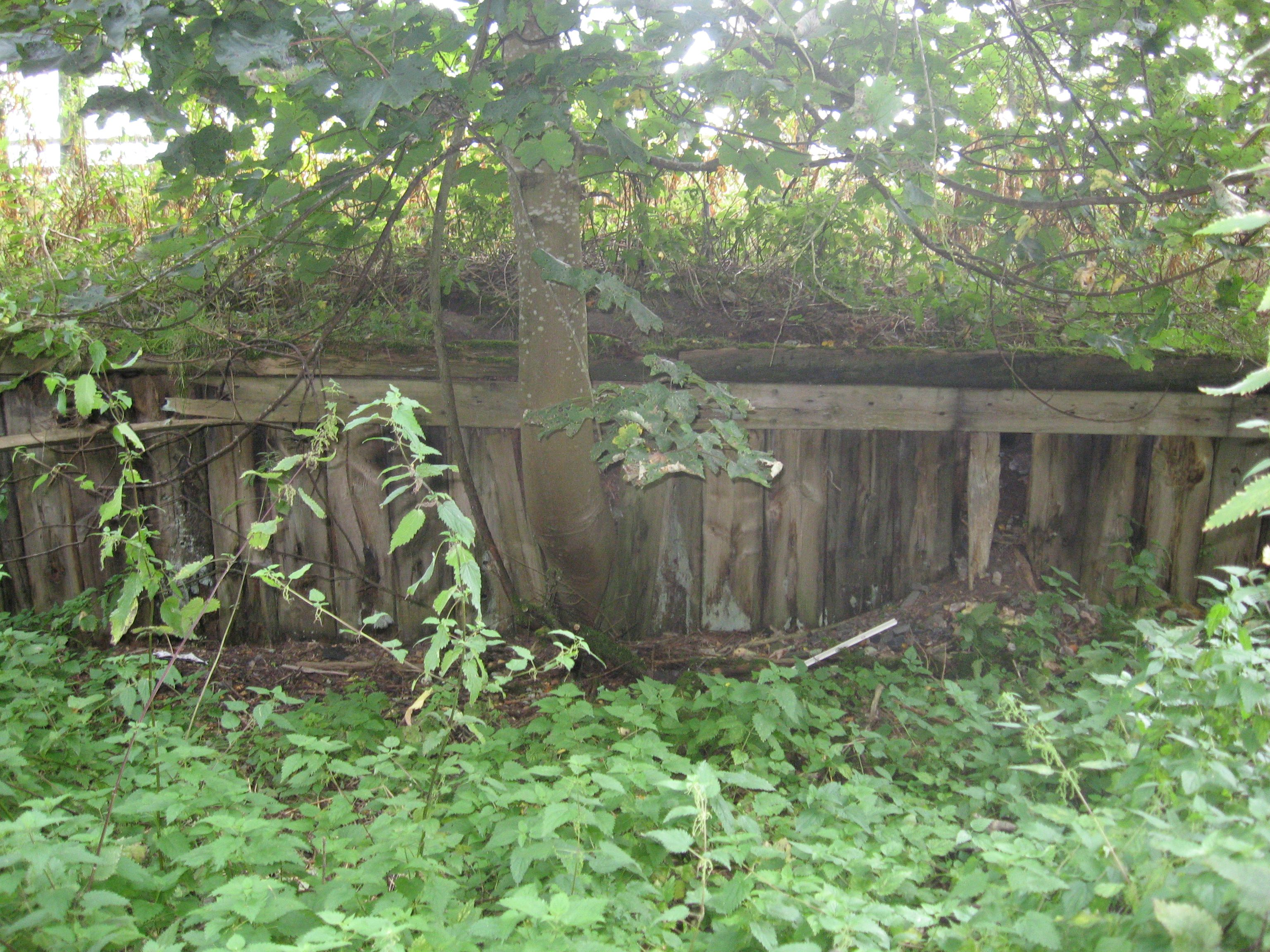
- The remains of the platform in 2010

General information
- Location: Humbie, East Lothian; Scotland
- Coordinates: 55.8758°N 2.8311°W
- Grid reference: NT481650
- Platforms: 1

Other information
- Status: Disused

History
- Original company: North British Railway
- Pre-grouping: North British Railway
- Post-grouping: London and North Eastern Railway

Key dates
- 14 October 1901: Opened
- 3 April 1933: Closed
Location

Humbie railway station served the civil parish of Humbie, East Lothian, Scotland, from 1901 to 1933 on the Macmerry Branch.

== History ==
The station was opened on 14 October 1901 by the North British Railway. On the south side was the goods yard and to the west was Highlea Siding. The station closed on 3 April 1933.

Preceding station	Disused railways	Following station
Gifford; Line and station closed	North British Railway; Macmerry Branch	Saltoun; Line and station closed
