= Macmerry Branch =

Former railway line in Scotland

Overview
- Locale: Scotland
- Successor: North British Railway

Technical
- Track gauge: 4 ft 8 1/2 in (1,435 mm)

The Macmerry Branch was a North British Railway built double track branch railway line in East Lothian, Scotland, that ran from a junction west of Inveresk on the East Coast Main Line to Macmerry via four intermediate stations, Smeaton, Crossgatehall Halt, Ormiston, and Winton. Two lines ran off the branch line, one a spur line to Hardengreen Junction on the Waverley Line from Smeaton, and the other a branch line to Gifford from just past Ormiston.

== History ==
Authorised on 3 June 1862 the line was completed and opened on 19 March 1870. Opened to serve local collieries and the Gladsmuir iron works, it was not until 1 May 1872 that the line's stations opened. The spur line to Hardengreen Junction closed in 1913 and the line itself closed in stages. For passengers, the Macmerry to Ormiston closed on 1 July 1925, Smeaton closed on 22 September 1930, and the remaining line Gifford to Smeaton Jn on 3 April 1933. For freight the section Macmerry to Ormiston closed on 2 May 1960, and the rest of the line on 25 May 1965. The small section that remained open to serve Dalkeith colliery and its washery closed in 1980.

The stretch from Crossgatehall to Saltoun now forms the Pencaitland Railway Walk.

== Connections with other lines ==
- Gifford and Garvald Railway at Ormiston
- North British Railway Main Line at Inveresk
- Edinburgh and Dalkeith Railway between Eskbank and Dalhousie
- Peebles Railway between Eskbank and Dalhousie, and onto the Esk Valley Railway

== See also ==
The Smeaton railway branches of the Lothians
