= Macmerry =

Village in East Lothian, Scotland

Coordinates: 55.941°N 2.906°W

Macmerry: Scottish Gaelic: Magh Mhoire
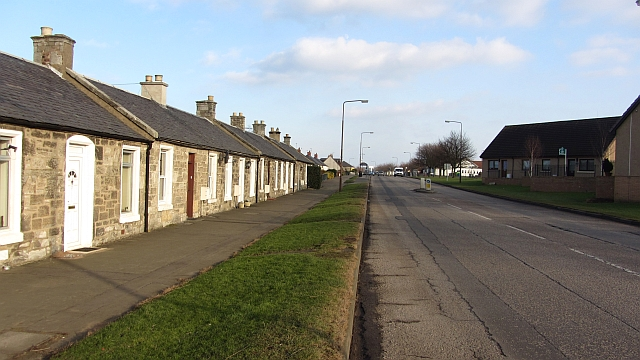
- Main Road, A199, Macmerry

- Location within East Lothian
- Population: 1,430 (2020)
- OS grid reference: NT434723
- Civil parish: Gladsmuir; Pencaitland
- Council area: East Lothian
- Lieutenancy area: East Lothian
- Country: Scotland
- Sovereign state: United Kingdom
- Post town: TRANENT
- Postcode district: EH33
- Dialling code: 01875
- Police: Scotland
- Fire: Scottish
- Ambulance: Scottish
- UK Parliament: East Lothian
- Scottish Parliament: East Lothian

Macmerry is a village located on the old A1 (now renumbered the A199) just east of Tranent.

The village has a primary school with a roll of around 100.

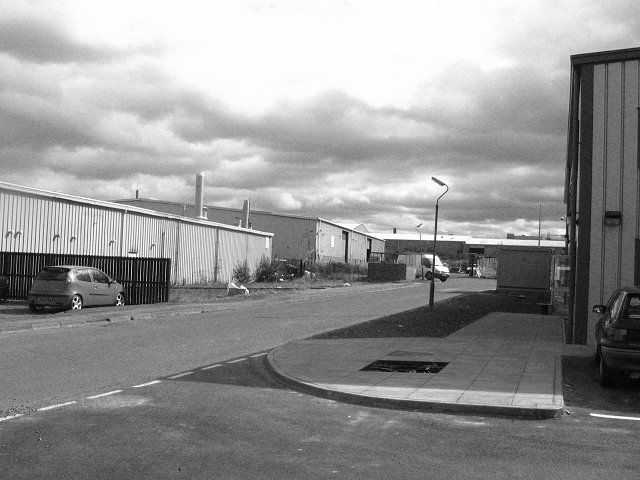
Macmerry Industrial Estate

There is an industrial estate to the east of the town. Originally this area was part of the RAF Macmerry, also known as Penston, which closed in 1953.

There was a railway branch line until 1960 which served the local coal mines.

== Transport ==
Macmerry has two major bus networks Prentice Coaches and Lothian Buses

Prentice 108 serves the village town towards either Haddington or Fort Kinnaird

Lothian Buses service 104 which is owned by Lothian Country Buses serves the area and continue on towards Gladsmuir and then Haddington. Macmerry is in Zone C of Lothian Country Buses fare zone map, alongside Gladsmuir, Ormiston and Pencaitland.

== See also ==
- List of places in East Lothian
- List of places in Scotland
