= Millerhill Marshalling Yard =

Railway maintenance depot in Millerhill, Scotland

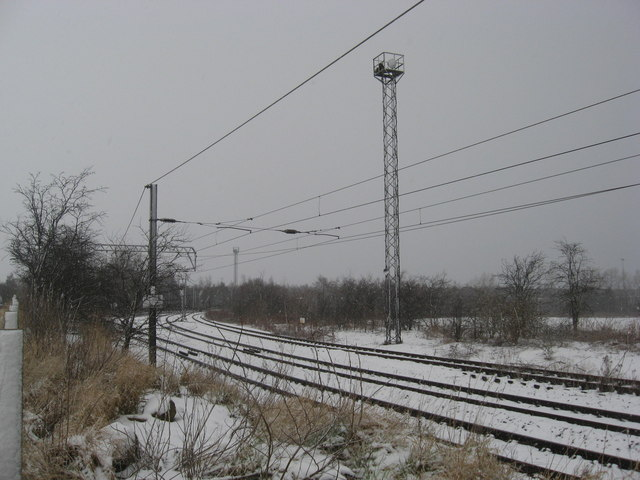
- The entry to the marshalling yard
- Interactive map of Millerhill Marshalling Yard

Location
- Location: Millerhill, Scotland, UK
- Coordinates: 55.9237°N 3.0829°W
- OS grid: NT324706

Characteristics
- Owner: DB
- Depot code: MV (1973 -)
- Type: DMU, Diesel

History
- Opened: 1962
- Former depot code: 64A (1 April 1967 - 5 May 1973)

Millerhill Marshalling Yard is a traction maintenance depot located in Millerhill, Scotland. The depot is situated on the Edinburgh and Hawick Railway and was near Millerhill station until it closed.

The depot code is MH.

== History ==
The depot used to have an allocation of First ScotRail Class 150 Sprinters until they were leased to other companies.

== Present ==
As of 2016, the depot's allocation consists of Class 37 and Class 66 locomotives and ScotRail Class 156 Sprinters and Class 158 Express Sprinters.

A £30 million stabling facility for Class 385 opened in 2018.
