= Gifford railway station =

Disused railway station in Gifford, East Lothian

Gifford
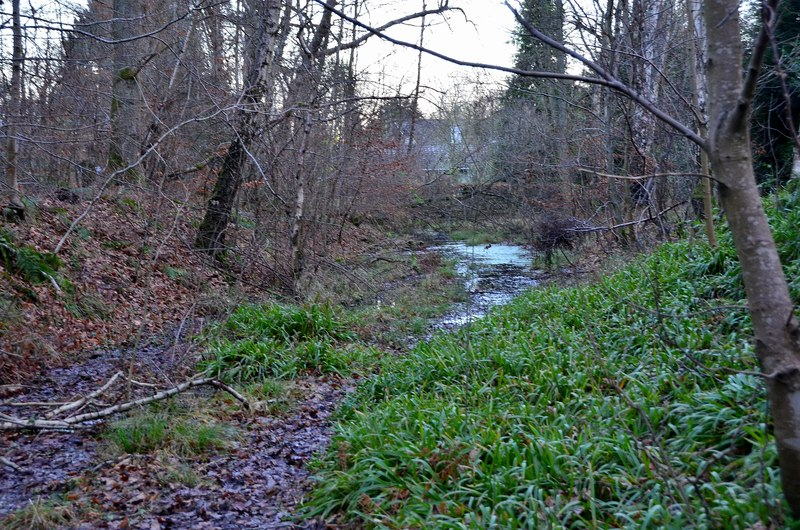
- The site of the line and station in 2013

General information
- Location: Gifford, East Lothian; Scotland
- Coordinates: 55.9052°N 2.7541°W
- Grid reference: NT529682
- Platforms: 1

Other information
- Status: Disused

History
- Original company: North British Railway
- Pre-grouping: North British Railway
- Post-grouping: London and North Eastern Railway

Key dates
- 14 October 1901: Opened
- 3 April 1933: Closed
Location

Gifford railway station served the village of Gifford, East Lothian, Scotland, from 1901 to 1933 on the Macmerry Branch.

== History ==
The station was opened on 14 October 1901 by the North British Railway. To the south was the station building, on the west side were two sidings and ok the south side was a railway cottage. The station closed on 3 April 1933.

Preceding station	Disused railways	Following station
Terminus	North British Railway; Macmerry Branch	Humbie; Line and station closed
