= Smeaton railway station =

Disused railway station in Smeaton, East Lothian

Coordinates: 55.9130°N 3.0352°W

Smeaton

General information
- Location: Smeaton, East Lothian; Scotland
- Platforms: 1

Other information
- Status: Disused

History
- Original company: North British Railway
- Pre-grouping: North British Railway
- Post-grouping: London and North Eastern Railway

Key dates
- 1 May 1872: Opened
- 22 September 1930: Closed
Location

Smeaton railway station served the village of Smeaton, south of Musselburgh in East Lothian, Scotland, from 1872 to 1930 on the Macmerry Branch.

== History ==
The station was opened on 1 May 1872 by the North British Railway. At the north end was Smeaton Junction signal box, which opened before the station in 1867. This box was extended when the line to the north was doubled. The station closed on 22 September 1930.

| Preceding station | Disused railways | Following station |
|---|---|---|
| Inveresk; Line and station closed | North British Railway; Macmerry Branch | Terminus |
