= Ormiston railway station, Scotland =

Disused railway station in Ormiston, East Lothian

Ormiston
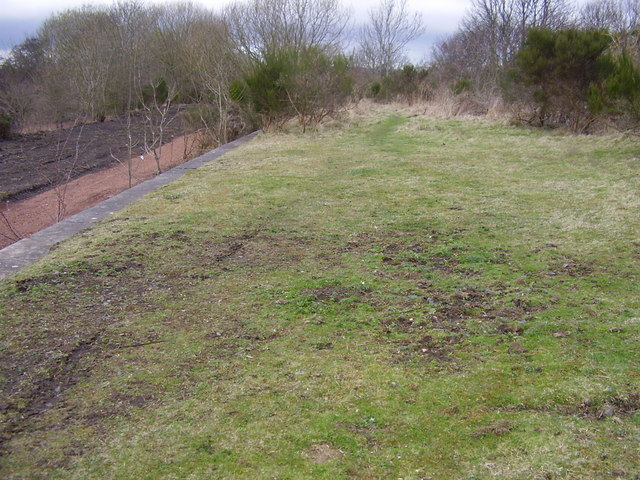
- The remains of the platform in 2008

General information
- Location: Ormiston, East Lothian; Scotland
- Coordinates: 55.9171°N 2.9354°W
- Grid reference: NT416697
- Platforms: 1

Other information
- Status: Disused

History
- Original company: North British Railway
- Pre-grouping: North British Railway
- Post-grouping: London and North Eastern Railway

Key dates
- 1 May 1872: Opened
- 3 April 1933: Closed
Location

Ormiston railway station served the village of Ormiston, East Lothian, Scotland, from 1872 to 1933 on the Macmerry Branch.

== History ==
The station was opened on 1 May 1872 by the North British Railway, although it opened earlier to goods in 1867. On the west side was a loading bank, on the south side was Ormiston Junction signal box, which opened in 1901 and closed in 1956, to the north was the goods yard and further to the north was Ormiston Station Colliery. The station closed to passengers on 3 April 1933.

Preceding station	Disused railways	Following station
Winton; Line and station closed	North British Railway; Macmerry Branch	Crossgatehall Halt; Line and station closed
