= Esk Valley Railway (Scotland) =

Former railway line in Scotland

The Esk Valley Railway was a short branch line built to serve industry in the valley of the River North Esk, south of Edinburgh in Scotland. The terminus was Polton. The line opened on 15 April 1867

In the nineteenth century passenger use of the line was buoyant, but it declined substantially when road transport services became widespread from the 1920s. The passenger service was withdrawn in 1951, and the goods service closed after the decline of the local industries, in 1964. No railway use is made of the former line now.

== History ==
=== The Peebles Railway ===
After the frenzy of railway promotion in Scotland in 1845, many communities in areas that did not have a railway saw that they were at a disadvantage: goods they required, especially coal, and lime for improving land, were much more expensive than at railway towns; and their own manufactures cost more to move to markets elsewhere.

The people of Peebles promoted their own railway and the Peebles Railway opened in 1855, joining the line that became the Waverley Route near Dalkeith, and connecting the town with Edinburgh. From Eskbank the Peebles line crossed high ground south-east of the valley of the River North Esk. The valley was already heavily industrialised with at least three paper mills, which required access to plentiful water; in addition carpets were made locally and corn was milled.

=== The Esk Valley Railway ===
Esk Valley Railway Act 1863
- Act of Parliament
- Parliament of the United Kingdom
- Long title: An Act for making a Railway from a Point near to Eskbank Station on the Line of the Hawick Branch of the North British Railway to Springfield in the Parish of Lasswade and County of Edinburgh, to be called "The Esk Valley Railway;" and for other Purposes.
- Citation: 26 & 27 Vict. c. cxcv

Dates
- Royal assent: 21 July 1863

Text of statute as originally enacted

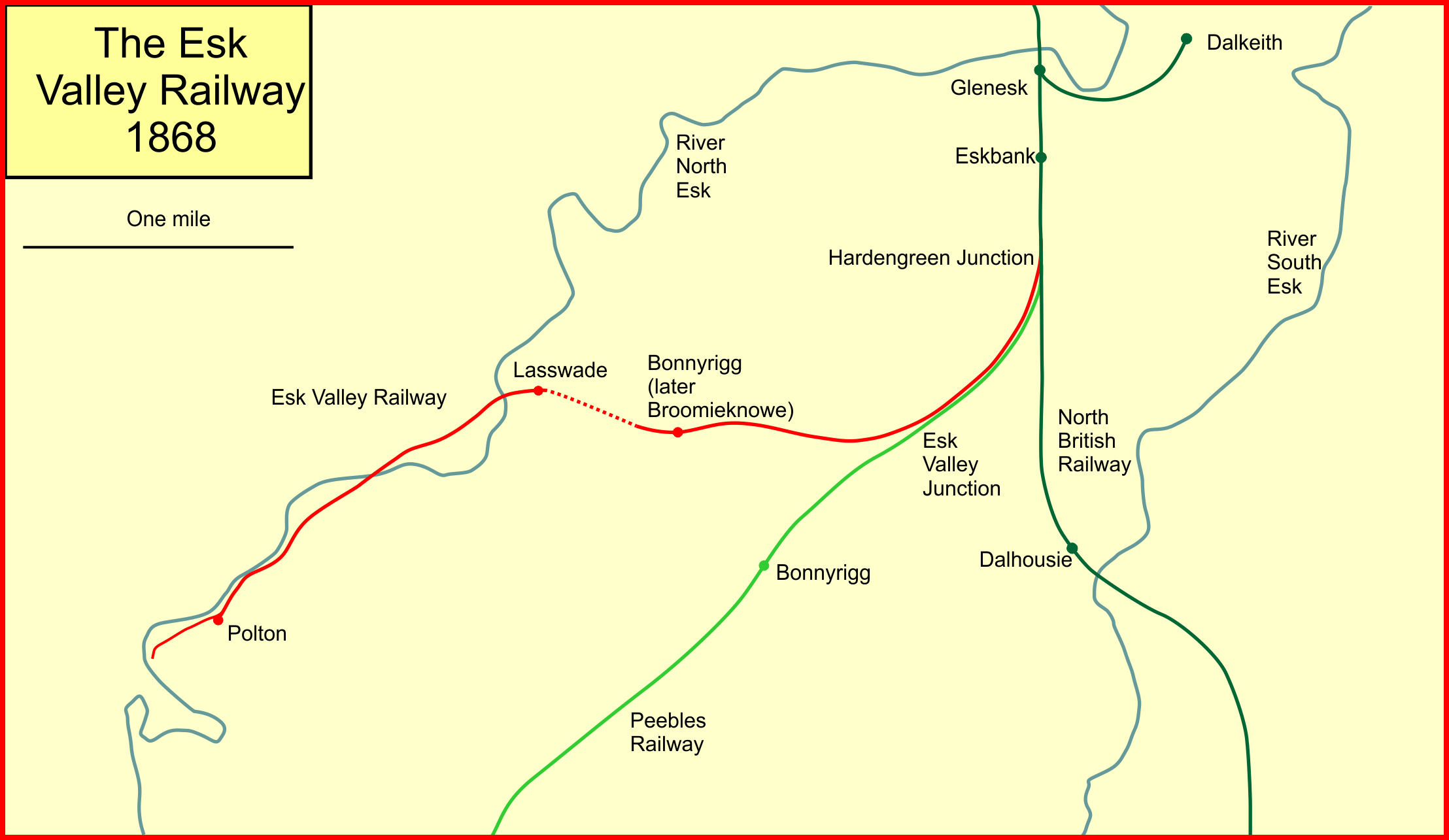
System map of the Esk Valley Railway

From 1860 local promoters negotiated with the North British Railway (NBR; the NBR was working the Peebles Railway) over the construction of a branch line to Polton from the Peebles line. At this time there was intense rivalry between the NBR and the Caledonian Railway, especially over retaining a monopoly of service in any geographical area while attempting to penetrate the rival's area. The NBR were quick to act in support of the line to Polton, fearing that the Caledonian would enter the district otherwise; indeed the Caledonian had published proposals to build a line into the area, from Slateford via Penicuik to Dalkeith. The NBR paid the parliamentary deposit for the bill to be presented. The Polton branch line became the Esk Valley Railway, and was authorised by the Esk Valley Railway Act 1863 (26 & 27 Vict. c. cxcv) of 21 July 1863. It was to be two miles in length.

North British Railway (Esk Valley Lease) Act 1866
- Act of Parliament
- Parliament of the United Kingdom
- Long title: An Act for leasing the Esk Valley Railway to the North British Railway Company; and for other Purposes.
- Citation: 29 & 30 Vict. c. cc

Dates
- Royal assent: 16 July 1866

Other legislation
- Repealed by: North British Railway Act 1871

Status: Repealed

Text of statute as originally enacted

The little company found it difficult to raise capital, and the NBR subscribed £10,000. Notwithstanding that difficulty, the company proposed an extension to Penicuik, but agreed to withdraw it when the North British Railway proposed to lease its line (construction of which was hardly started) for £1,350 a year, equivalent to 5% on its share capital of £27,000. The lease was authorised by the North British Railway (Esk Valley Lease) Act 1866 (29 & 30 Vict. c. cc) on 16 July 1866.

A start on building the line was delayed, not starting until 5 September 1864, and the construction of the line was complex as it had to follow the narrow valley of the River North Esk. There was a 471-yard tunnel between Bonnyrigg and Lasswade, and a six-arch stone viaduct at Lasswade.

=== Opening ===
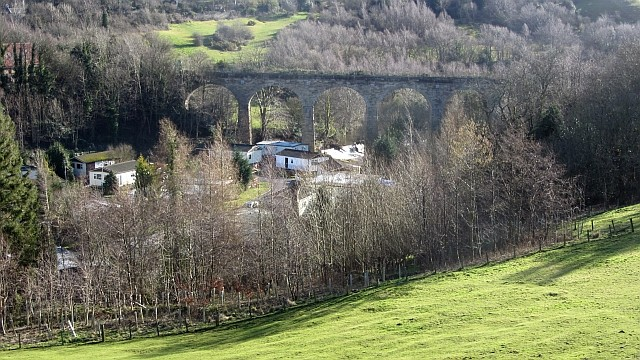
Viaduct at Polton

When the line was nearing completion, the company announced that train services would start on 1 April 1867. Two stations were provided on the line, Bonnyrigg (later renamed Broomieknowe) and Polton. The NBR had agreed to work (and lease) the line but refused to do so immediately because a station had not been constructed at Lasswade, as they had expected. The Esk Valley Railway Company protested that they were not bound to provide the station, and the matter went to arbitration. Pending the conclusion of that, the NBR agreed to commence operation on 15 April 1867, and for accounting purposes (that is, payment of the lease charge) the "official" commencing date would be 8 April 1867.

So trains started running on 15 April. (Note: Quick, Ross, Thomas (NBR, volume 1, and also Forgotten Railways) and Paterson; Marshall says 18 April 1867; Munro says 12 October 1868.) When the line opened, it was worked by the North British Railway.

The arbitrator found that the EVR was indeed bound to provide the Lasswade station, and it did so, opening it on 12 October 1868; construction of the station cost it six months rental of the entire line.

The Esk Valley Railway Company was absorbed by the North British Railway under the North British Railway Act 1871 (34 & 35 Vict. c. cvi) on 1 July 1871. (Note: Munro. Awdry says the EVR was absorbed by the NBR by an act of Parliament of 13 July 1871 with effect from 31 July. Ross and Thomas say "on 13 July 1871".) The terms guaranteed the EVR shareholders a 3.5% dividend on their holding.

The valedictory shareholders' meeting of the EVR heard the chairman declare:

Through unforeseen circumstances the expenditure of the Company has considerably exceeded what was at first anticipated, but notwithstanding of this the directors trust that the benefit done to the district and the securing to the shareholders a permanent dividend of 3.25% is not an inadequate return for the labour and money expended.

=== Train service ===
The line generated a considerable residential passenger business and an early outer suburban traffic for Edinburgh included Polton in its network.

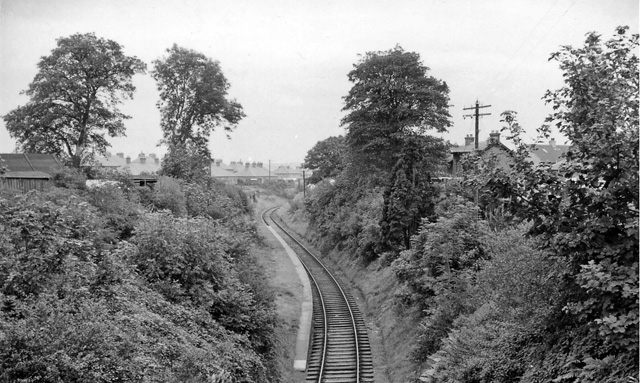
Remains of Broomieknowe station photographed in 1962.

In 1895 there were four daily passenger trains in each direction, with two more on Saturdays, between Eskbank and Polton. Some of these were through trains from Edinburgh. The journey time between Eskbank and Polton was typically 12 minutes. There was no Sunday service.

== The twentieth century ==
The North British Railway was a constituent of the new London and North Eastern Railway (LNER) from 1923, following the Railways Act 1921 and the railways were again re-organised by government in 1948, when the railways were nationalised, the local lines being part of British Railways Scottish Region.

In 1950 there were still six passenger trains in each direction, but by this time road transport had made heavy inroads into passenger business on the line, and the passenger service closed on 10 September 1951, though a passenger excursion train traversed the line in August 1963.

Polton Mill had closed shortly after World War II, and Springfield Mill closed in 1966. The line remained open for goods traffic until it too closed on 18 May 1964 following the run down of the mills.

== Current use ==
The course of the Esk Valley Railway is traceable for much of its length although no part of it has been designated as a public footpath. The tunnel at Lasswade has been sealed although both portals are fairly easily accessible. Lasswade Viaduct is Grade B listed and is not accessible.

== Topography ==
The Esk Valley Railway made a junction with the Peebles Railway at Hardengreen Junction, but it ran parallel and adjacent to the Edinburgh, Loanhead and Roslin Railway for a short distance, as far as Esk Valley Junction. The two companies agreed to operate the track as a double line instead of two single lines between Hardengreen Junction and Esk Valley Junction.

Locations on the line were:

- Hardengreen Junction; divergence from the Peebles Railway;
- Esk Valley Junction; divergence from the Edinburgh Loanhead and Roslin Railway;
- Bonnyrigg; opened 15 April 1867; renamed Broomieknowe 1868; closed 1 January 1917; re-opened 1 April 1919; closed 10 September 1951;
- Lasswade; opened 12 October 1868; closed 10 September 1951;
- Polton; opened 15 April 1867; closed 10 September 1951.
