= Edinburgh and Dalkeith Railway =

Railway in Scotland (1831–1845)

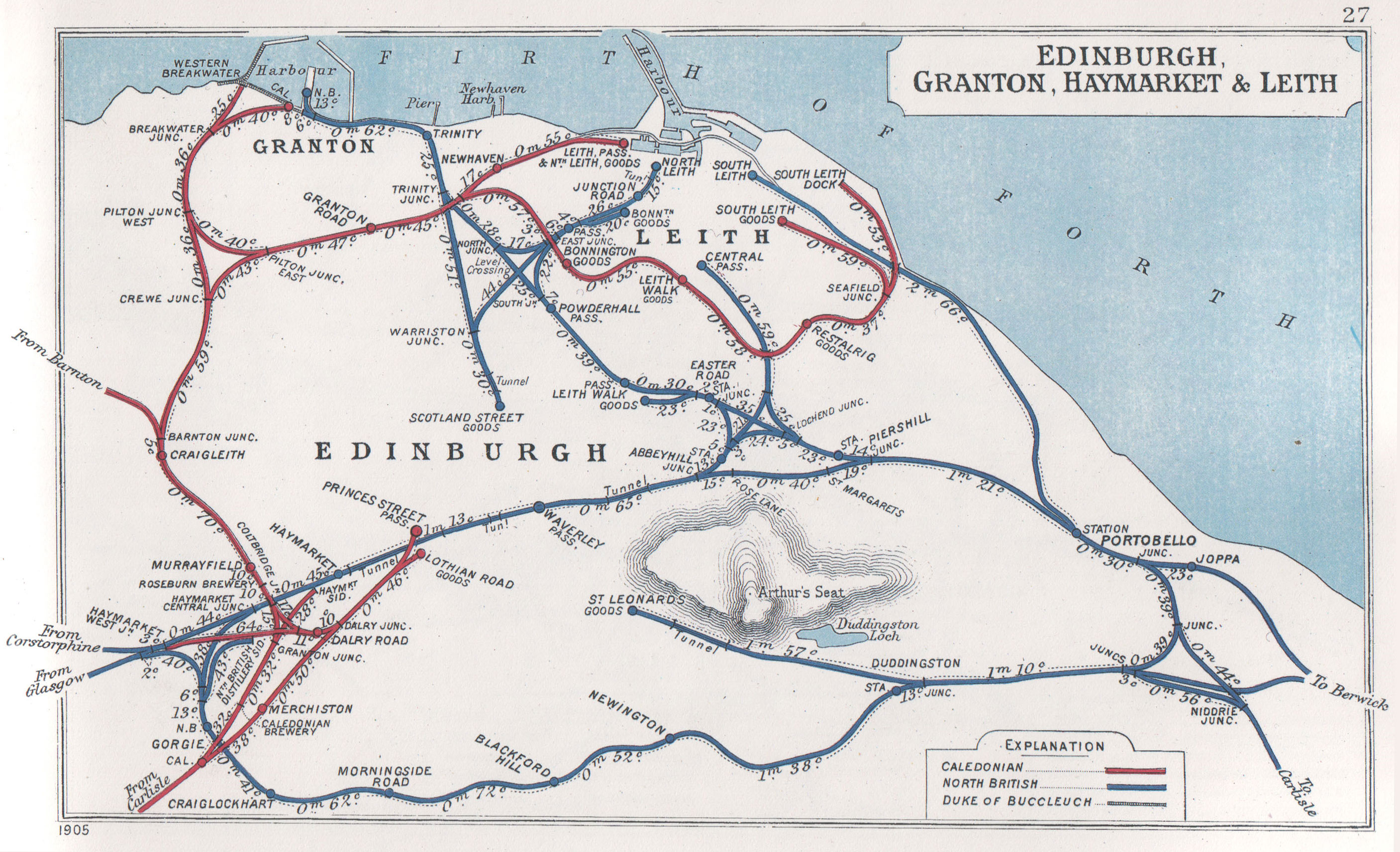
- A 1905 Railway Clearing House diagram of Edinburgh railways, with the Innocent Railway to St Leonards (lower centre)

Overview
- Headquarters: Edinburgh
- Locale: Scotland
- Dates of operation: July 1831–1845 taken over by NBR
- Successor: North British Railway

Technical
- Track gauge: 4 ft 6 in (1,372 mm) Scotch gauge
- Length: 8 1/4 miles (13.3 km)

The Edinburgh and Dalkeith Railway was an early railway built to convey coal from pits in the vicinity of Dalkeith into the capital. It was a horse-operated line, with a terminus at St Leonards on the south side of Arthur's Seat.

Opened in stages from 1831, it was Edinburgh's first railway, and used the track gauge of 4 ft 6 in, commonly used for mineral railways in Scotland. The entry into the terminus involved a passage through a tunnel on a rope-worked incline.

It was not planned for passengers, but a trader operated passenger services and they were surprisingly successful, and the company later operated them itself.

When intercity railways were being planned, the North British Railway wished to reach Carlisle from Edinburgh, and it purchased the Dalkeith line in 1845 to secure part of the route. The new owners altered the gauge to the standard 4 ft 8 1/2 in and laid stronger track for locomotive operation. Part of its main line became incorporated into the Waverley Route. Only a small section of the network remains open.

== Summary ==
From 1800 the city of Edinburgh had an increasing appetite for coal; although there were coal pits a few miles away, the roads of the time were inadequate, and the horse-and-cart journey added substantially to the cost to the user. Coal owners with pits in the Dalkeith area got together and formed a railway to carry their coal to the capital.

It was designed for horse-drawn operation, with an Edinburgh terminal, called St Leonard's, on the south side of Salisbury Crags. The location was chosen for simplicity of land acquisition, and the coal would in any case need to be distributed in the city. However, reaching the location involved a tunnel on a steep gradient, and wagons were hauled up and lowered by rope operation controlled by a steam engine.

The line was opened in 1831 from St Leonards to Dalhousie Mains, with a branch line to Fisherrow, a small harbour just to the west of Musselburgh.

A businessman started operating passenger coaches, also horse drawn, from 1832, and this was very successful; the railway company itself later took over the passenger operation.

A branch line to Leith, to give better access to shipping, opened in 1832. The total network amounted to about 12 miles (19 km), but many private tramway connections were made in the coal districts to bring the coal to the railway.

Railway technology advanced, and in the 1840s railways using steam locomotives and running longer distances were being planned and built. In 1845 the North British Railway purchased the line, using it as a springboard for its line to Carlisle. They strengthened the track for locomotive operation, and the Edinburgh to Carlisle route became the Waverley Route.

The Edinburgh and Dalkeith line was referred to by a writer as "the Innocent Railway", referring to its unsophisticated horse traction and leisurely ways; the term was understood later to refer to the line's supposed freedom from accident, although this is not historically accurate.

== Formation ==
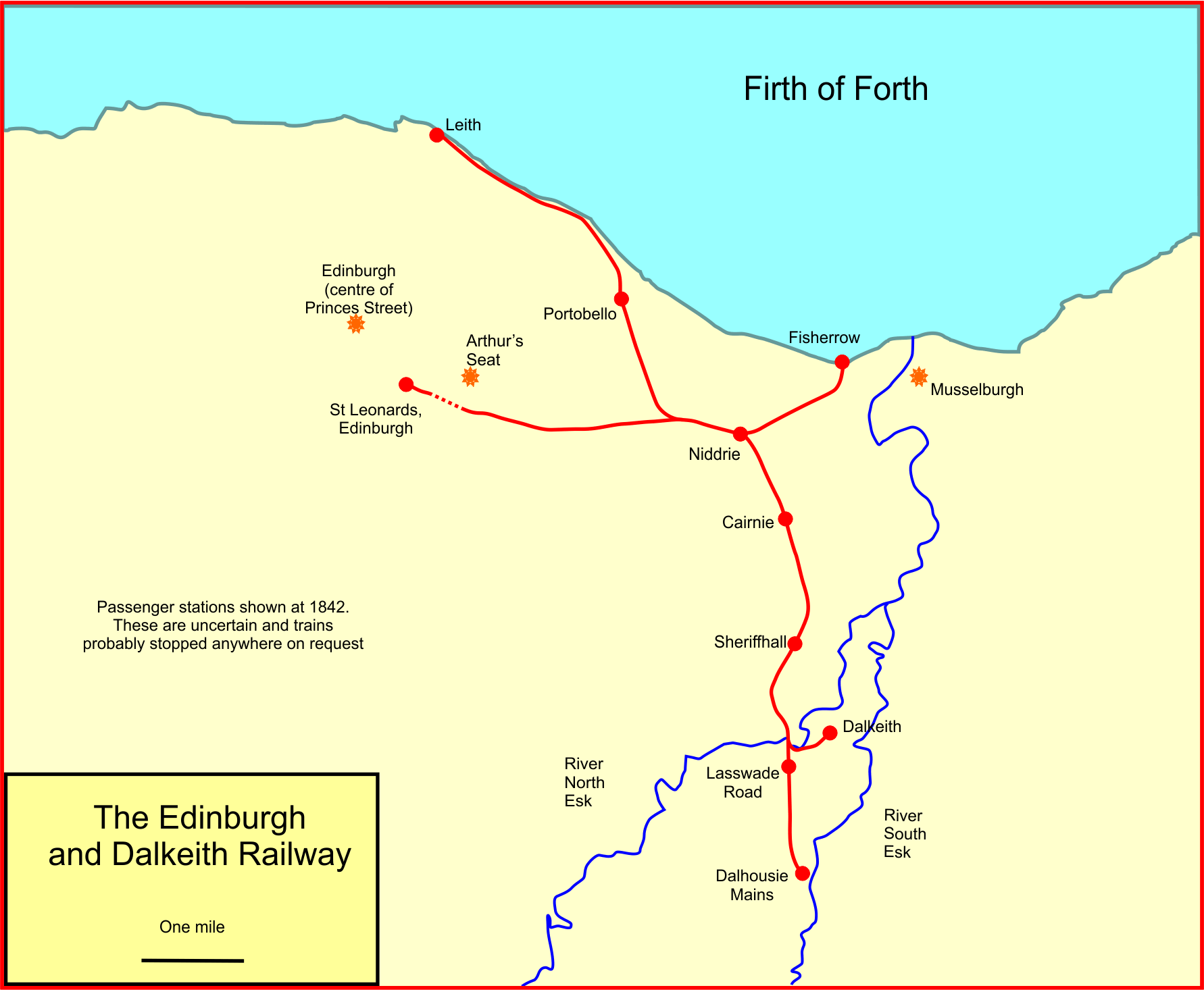
System map of the Edinburgh and Dalkeith Railway

The city of Edinburgh had an accelerating demand for coal in the early years of the nineteenth century, rising from 200,000 tons per year in 1800 to 350,000 in 1830.

Coal in the immediate locality was of poor quality and of limited quantity. Better coal was being brought in from Fife and Tyneside by coastal shipping, and from Monklands by the Union Canal. The Duke of Buccleuch had coal pits in the Dalkeith area with superior coal, but road transport to the capital cost 4 shillings per ton from a final delivery price of 11 to 17 shillings. A report prepared for him by his factor John Grieve proposed a railway from his pits to the city, with a branch to Fisherrow, a fishing harbour near Musselburgh.

Edinburgh and Dalkeith Railway Act 1826
- Act of Parliament
- Parliament of the United Kingdom
- Long title: An Act for making and maintaining a Railway from Edinburgh to the South Side of the River North Esk, near Dalkeith and Newbattle, with Branches therefrom, all in the County of Edinburgh.
- Citation: 7 Geo. 4. c. xcviii

Dates
- Royal assent: 26 May 1826

Text of statute as originally enacted

The Edinburgh and Dalkeith Railway Company received its act of Parliament, the Edinburgh and Dalkeith Railway Act 1826 (7 Geo. 4. c. xcviii) on 26 May 1826. It was designed as a horse-drawn railway, and its engineer, James Jardine, adopted the track gauge of 4 ft 6 in, which had been used in the West of Scotland. The line linked coal pits in the Dalkeith area to the city of Edinburgh, bringing coal for domestic and industrial use. The Edinburgh terminus was called St Leonards, located to the south of Salisbury Crags, in the area between the present-day St Leonard's Street and St Leonard's Bank.

Edinburgh and Dalkeith Railway Act 1829
- Act of Parliament
- Parliament of the United Kingdom
- Long title: An Act to enable the Edinburgh and Dalkeith Railway Company to raise a further Sum of Money, to make a Branch from the Said Railway to Leith, and for other Purposes relating thereto.
- Citation: 10 Geo. 4. c. cxxii

Dates
- Royal assent: 4 June 1829

Text of statute as originally enacted

Edinburgh and Dalkeith Railway (Dalkeith and Leith Branches) Act 1834
- Act of Parliament
- Parliament of the United Kingdom
- Long title: An Act to enable the Edinburgh and Dalkeith Railway Company to make a Branch from the said Railway to the Town of Dalkeith, and to extend the Leith Branch of the said Railway, and for other Purposes relating thereto.
- Citation: 4 & 5 Will. 4. c. lxxi

Dates
- Royal assent: 27 June 1834
Other legislation
Repealed by	North British Railway Consolidation Act 1858

Status: Repealed

Text of statute as originally enacted

The original act authorised share capital of £70,125; a second act of Parliament, the Edinburgh and Dalkeith Railway Act 1829 (10 Geo. 4. c. cxxii), was obtained on 4 June 1829, authorising further share capital of £8,053, and sanctioning the Leith Branch. The third act of Parliament, the Edinburgh and Dalkeith Railway (Dalkeith and Leith Branches) Act 1834 (4 & 5 Will. 4. c. lxxi), on 27 June 1834, authorised a further £54,875 to build branches to Fisherrow, and "allowing a certain amount of passenger traffic by horse-drawn railway coaches".

The line was designed by James Jardine, its engineer from 1826; the company's manager David Rankine also had an engineering role from the mid-1830s.

== Promoters ==
The railway was a public company, but the five coal-owners who would benefit from the line were the dominant shareholders: Sir John Hope, the Marquis of Lothian, John Grieve (presumably as proxy for the Duke of Buccleuch), and two members of the Dundas family who owned the pits at Arniston.

== First openings ==
The opening of the line was much delayed by difficulties which the contractor had not foreseen and which he had not sufficient capital to enable him to surmount.

The main line opened from St Leonard's to a coal pit at Craighall on 4 July 1831; this was probably close to the present-day Newcraighall.

It was soon extended to a temporary terminus at Dalhousie Mains, on the north bank of the South Esk river, opening in October 1831. The route ran via Millerhill village and Hardengreen, crossing the North Esk on a bridge 60 feet (18 m) high, and the main line was about 10 3/4 miles (17.3 km) long.

The Fisherrow branch from Niddry (later spelt Niddrie) opened on the same day; the junction at Niddry was facing for trains from St Leonards. Fisherrow had a small fishing harbour, and offered the possibility of transferring coal to coastal shipping. (Carter calls the point of divergence "Wanton Walls", and says that there was another branch from Cairney to Musselburgh collieries.)

The main line was double track, and the branch was single. The gauge was 4 ft 6in, "which [the engineer] Grainger had established with his railways in the west". Horse haulage was used throughout, (except of course for the rope-worked incline plane).

At this early date there was no thought of passenger operation, and the locations on the line were not "stations". The terminus at Dalhousie Mains is referred to as "Eskbank" by one source, but that name was not applied until after takeover of the line by the North British Railway. Cobb calls the 1834 passenger station there "South Esk", but that may simply refer to "the station at the South Esk River".

There were numerous small coal pits on the line of route, and they were quick to construct their own tramway connections to the line; already in 1832 a contemporary account of a journey on the line described "the rich flat valley through which we now rolled, veined with rail-ways, branching off, right and left, to the several coal-works – to Edmonstone, Newton, 'Sir John's' [colliery], &c &c".

== Extensions and branches ==
=== The Marquis of Lothian's Waggonway ===
The Marquis of Lothian had coal pits on the south-eastern side of the South Esk river, at Arniston. He constructed an extension to the pits from the Edinburgh and Dalkeith Railway (E&DR) terminus at Dalhousie Mains at his own expense, a distance of 1 1/2 miles (2.4 km). This required a bridge over the South Esk; the total length was 1,011 feet (308 m).

The line was named "The Marquis of Lothian's Waggonway", and the first part opened on 21 January 1832, running east from the South Esk viaduct to reach pits at Bryans, immediately east of Newtongrange. This section is shown as "tramroad" on early maps.

Priestley refers to the E&DR raising an additional £7,815 for a short extension at Eskbank.

Later an extension forking southwards from the viaduct reached Lingerwood Colliery, and eventually reached as far south as Arniston Engine.

The pit at Lingerwood eventually became Lady Victoria Colliery and Newbattle Colliery, later with a considerable internal branch line between them and the main line. The pit at Arniston Engine was served by a tramway branch from Arniston, on the main line, which is located just short of Gorebridge station.

In compensation for the expense, the Marquis was allowed to use the North Esk viaduct on the E&DR for his coal free of charge.

=== Leith ===
In March 1835, the E&DR opened a branch (authorised by the Edinburgh and Dalkeith Railway Act 1829) from Niddrie to a terminus at Constitution Street in Leith. It was single track throughout; the junction at Niddrie was facing for trains from Dalhousie. (Note: Only Awdry gives the month; Railscot says 1838 but this may be a transcription error.) Carter gives the point of divergence as "Niddrie North Main Colliery", and he adds that the total length of the branches amounted to 6 1/2 miles (10.5 km).

=== Dalkeith branch ===
The E&DR made a branch from the south end of the North Esk viaduct curving round east and north-east into Dalkeith, opening in the autumn of 1838. "Date uncertain".

=== Duke of Buccleuch's railway ===
The Duke of Buccleuch owned coal pits at Smeaton and Cowden, north-east of Dalkeith. Like the Marquis of Lothian, he extended the line at his own expense to reach his pits in 1839. His line diverged from the Dalkeith branch just before the terminus, and crossed a large viaduct, "Victoria Bridge", over the South Esk; the line then forked to the two groups of pits.

== Route descriptions ==
Priestley, writing in 1831, described it:

This railway commences on the south side of the city of Edinburgh, near Salisbury Craigs, [sic] from whence it proceeds in an eastwardly direction, skirting the King's Park; thence, on the south side of Duddingston House, and by the village of Hunters Hall, to Redrow, where it communicates with the Edmonstone Railway. It afterwards takes a southerly course by Miller Hill Row, to within half a mile of the west side of the town of Dalkeith, where it crosses the North Esk River; thence, to the banks of South Esk River, at Dalhousie Mains, near Newbattle Abbey, from whence, the last act [i.e. the Edinburgh and Dalkeith Railway Act 1829] enables the company to extend it to Newton Grange. There is a branch from Wanton Walls to Fisher Row Harbour, on the Firth of Forth; another from Cairney to the collieries situate on the east side of the Esk, at Cowpits, near Musselburgh; and another by a subsequent act [also the Edinburgh and Dalkeith Railway Act 1829], which extends to Leith Harbour.

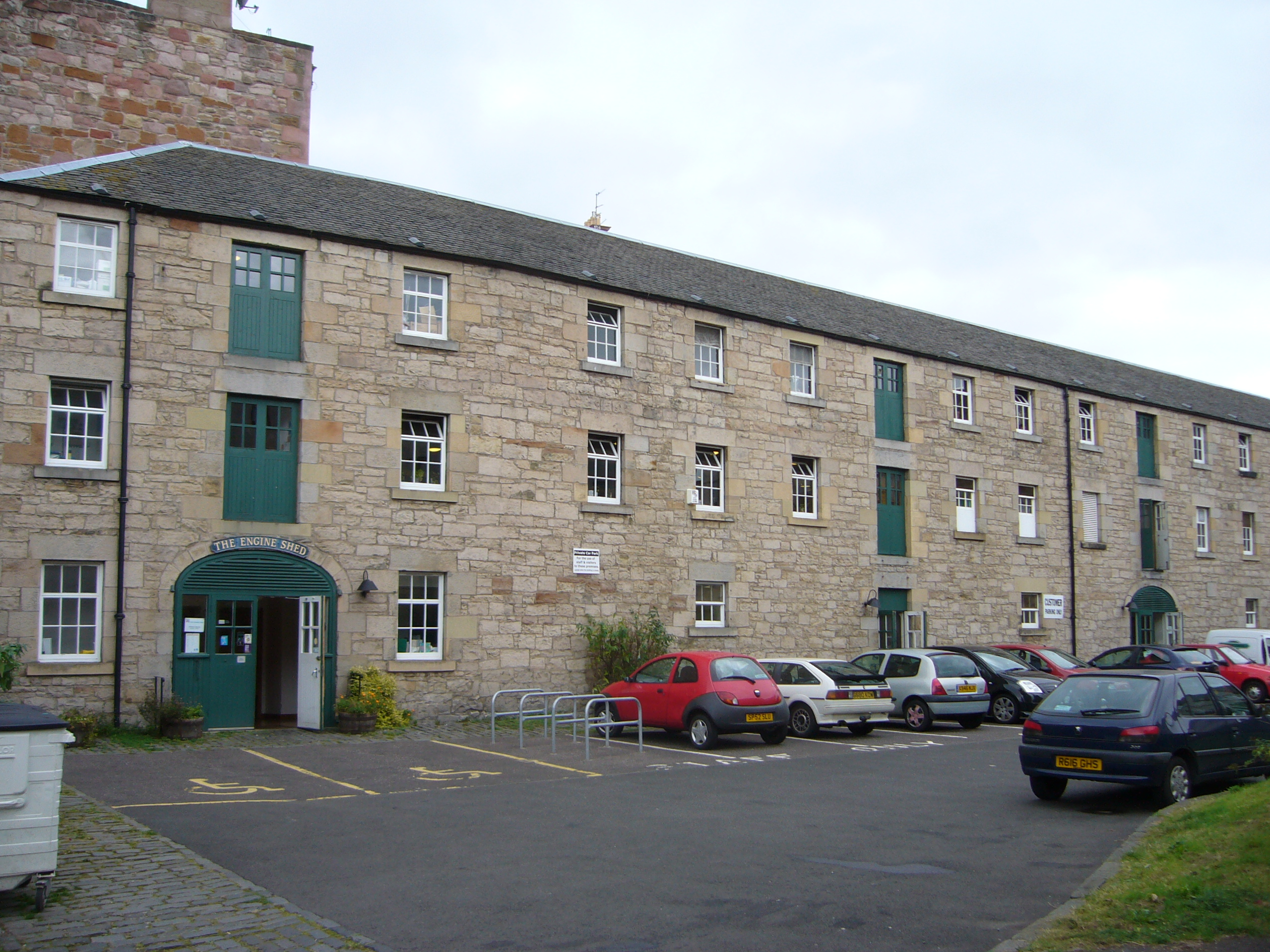
The goods warehouse building at St. Leonards

Whishaw says

The main line, which runs from the Edinburgh station to South Eske, is level for about half its length; and the remainder has an inclination of 1 in 234, the whole distance being 8 1/4 miles … The Leith branch is level for about one-third of its length; and the remaining portions have inclinations of 1 in 300 and 1 in 69 respectively, the whole length being 4 miles … The Musselburgh branch [i.e. Fisherrow] is altogether on an inclination of 1 in 51 1/2 … In the main line we counted seven bridges over the railway, four bridges under, six level road-crossings … the main line being double throughout … There is one tunnel 572 yards in length, which is on the Edinburgh inclined plane … the Tunnel is lighted by twenty-five gas lamps … The gauge is 4 feet 6 inches … the rails are of the fish-bellied form, weighing 28 lbs to the yard … the whole way is laid with freestone blocks … Near [South Eske] station is a long wooden bridge, which carries the Marquess of Lothian's railway over the river Eske.

== The inclined plane ==
Whishaw says

The inclined plane near the station at Edinburgh has an inclination of 1 in 30; it is 1130 yards in length, the upper part being straight, and the lower part considerably curved. It is worked by two low-pressure condensing engines, with cylinders 28 inches diameter, stroke 6 1/2 feet; average working-pressure, 5 lbs … consumption of fuel 2 1/2 tons per diem … About 30 tons gross is the usual load drawn up, and five minutes the time occupied; the descending loads draw out the rope after them … The signals from the bottom of the incline are given by an air-tube, about 3/4 inch diameter, with a small bell in the engine-house.

The two 25-horsepower (19 kW) steam engines were supplied by J. & C. Carmichael.

== Rails ==
The company used 28 lb/yd (14 kg/m) cast-iron fish-bellied rails.

== Coal ==
The E&DR was hugely successful, and was soon carrying 300 tons of coal every day. Coal for domestic and light industry use had been an expensive commodity, and the railway company went to great lengths to provide reliable coal deliveries, installing its own weighbridge at the St Leonards depot, and issuing certificates of quantity and quality for deliveries of its own "railway coal". As well as guaranteeing quality and quantity, the railway was able to quote a price for delivered coal, using a delivery system which it authorised itself.

== Passengers ==
Passengers had hardly been considered when the railway was being planned, but a businessman, Michael Fox (who had been dynamic in managing coal deliveries in the city) put "an old stagecoach on the line and on 2 June 1832 began a service of three return trips a day between St Leonards and the North Esk depot". In the first full month of operation, 14,392 passenger journeys were recorded, and in the second, 20,615, making 150,000 in the first year of operation for a revenue of £4,000.

There were no intermediate station structures, but passengers joined and alighted from the coaches when they wished. However it is likely that from the outset, anyone could put a private carriage on the line for personal use, on payment of a toll. Rates for such usage appeared in the press later in 1831.

Fox's enterprise was such a success that in 1834 the E&DR obtained powers to run its own passenger service and it took over Fox's operation in 1836. The passenger service ran from St Leonards to Dalhousie, and it was extended on to the Leith branch in 1838, running to Constitution Street there. Dalkeith was added to the passenger network in the autumn of 1839. Still using horse traction, this was a busier passenger operation than the Liverpool and Manchester Railway. (Note: Thomas quotes 469 (E&DR) to 378 (L&MR) "per mile of track"; this may be a calculation of passenger miles per week divided by network mileage.)

"In addition to timetable trains, private coaches could be hired from any station to any station at any hour of the day or night." During 1839 during evidence being given in Parliament, it was stated that the railway did not issue tickets because there were so many informal stopping places, and that some passengers declined to reveal their intended destination.

Whishaw, probably writing in 1839, describes the station arrangements:

The Edinburgh station and depot occupies about eight imperial acres. There is nothing worthy of notice in the buildings at this station... The South Eske station-house is built in the cottage style, and is of neat design... There is a general waiting-room, and one especially for ladies. Besides the terminal stations, there is a half-way stopping-place, which is at the divergence of the Leith branch [at Niddrie]. It is to be observed, that the driver stops to take up or set down a passenger whenever required. At Leith there is merely a shed-building. The trains-guards are also constables... Each guard carries a bugle-horn, which he sounds lustily as occasion requires.

The Company's stock of carriages at present consists of thirty-four passenger-carriages [and] eight luggage-vans... The passenger-carriages are of two kinds, closed and open; the closed carriages are in three compartments, each holding eight passengers. There are three doors only, which are on one side, the other side being entirely shut up... there is a seat in front and one behind, each of which will hold four persons, including the driver... The open carriages have no roofs, and are divided into two whole and two half compartments, the whole compartments holding eight, and the half compartments four passengers each.

There are eight trains leaving and eight trains arriving daily at the Edunburgh station. A passenger train consists usually of three carriages... Ascending the Leith Branch, two horses are required to one carriage; a boy rides on the leader, which is occasionally tripped up, and the boy is subject to sad accidents.

By the years 1842–1844 the railway carried 807,779 passengers on the main line and 207,625 passengers on the Leith branch, amounting to just over 50% of total receipts on the line.

Bremner, writing in 1869 and referring to the time before 1845, says:

[Many persons] have pleasant recollections of holiday trips made over the line. Then, as now, people took advantage of the Fast Days [public holidays] to spend a few hours outside the city, and it was no uncommon thing for the Dalkeith Railway to bear away four or five thousand pleasure-seekers on such occasions. The Musselburgh Races were also a fruitful source of revenue for the line. The passenger coaches were a sort of hybrid between the old-fashioned stage-coach and the modern [horse-]omnibus, and in summer the outside seats were the most popular.

The North British Railway produced a map in 1844, which showed intermediate stations on the Edinburgh and Dalkeith system. It is not known whether the list was exhaustive; they may simply have been "selected" locations; moreover later contemporary publications did not mention them; but they were

- Cairney;
- Sherrifhall;
- Portobello;
- Niddrie Junction; and
- Lasswade Road (at or near Eskbank).

It is most unlikely that any of these "stations" had any facilities.

== Absorption and reconstruction ==
A pioneering railway when it opened, the E&DR was being overtaken by technologically more advanced railways. By 1845 the Edinburgh and Glasgow Railway was under construction, approaching Edinburgh, and the North British Railway (NBR) was planning an extension to Berwick. The E&DR opposed this scheme at the parliamentary hearings, and was bought off when the NBR agreed to purchase the line for £113,000. The North British Railway Act 1845 (8 & 9 Vict. c. lxxxii) of July 1845 authorised the purchase.

This was a good price for a 12-mile (19 km) horse-drawn network; the purchase was effective in October 1845. In 1846 the line was closed temporarily while the new owner laid stronger track for locomotive operation, changing the track gauge to standard, and turning it into a proper main line railway. The NBR did the same to the Marquis of Lothian's Waggonway from the South Esk bridge to Arniston, (Note: Railscot implies that the NBR built a new line to the west of the Marquis's line, including an Esk bridge in a new location) forming a through route from Edinburgh to Gorebridge, opening on 7 July 1847 for goods and a week later for passengers.

A new connecting line from the new North Bridge (later "Waverley") station in Edinburgh via Portobello and Niddrie was opened at the same time, and a formal passenger train service was operated between the North Bridge station and Dalkeith. The North Bridge station was much more convenient for the city and for connecting trains, and usage of the original St Leonards terminus for passengers declined steeply: it closed on 1 November 1847.

A passenger service was put on again from 1 June 1860 but it was so little used that it was finally discontinued on 30 September 1860.

The branch to Fisherrow was linked to a small harbour on the west side of the Esk while the important town of Musselburgh was on the east. The harbour was prone to serious silting, and in 1835 the owners made structural changes to try to disperse the silt; this was unsuccessful and the opening was closed again in 1838. The NBR took the opportunity to build a branch to Musselburgh itself: the harbour there did not suffer so badly; the line crossed the River Esk, and opened in 1847. The Fisherrow line remained open for goods traffic.

== Later railway developments ==
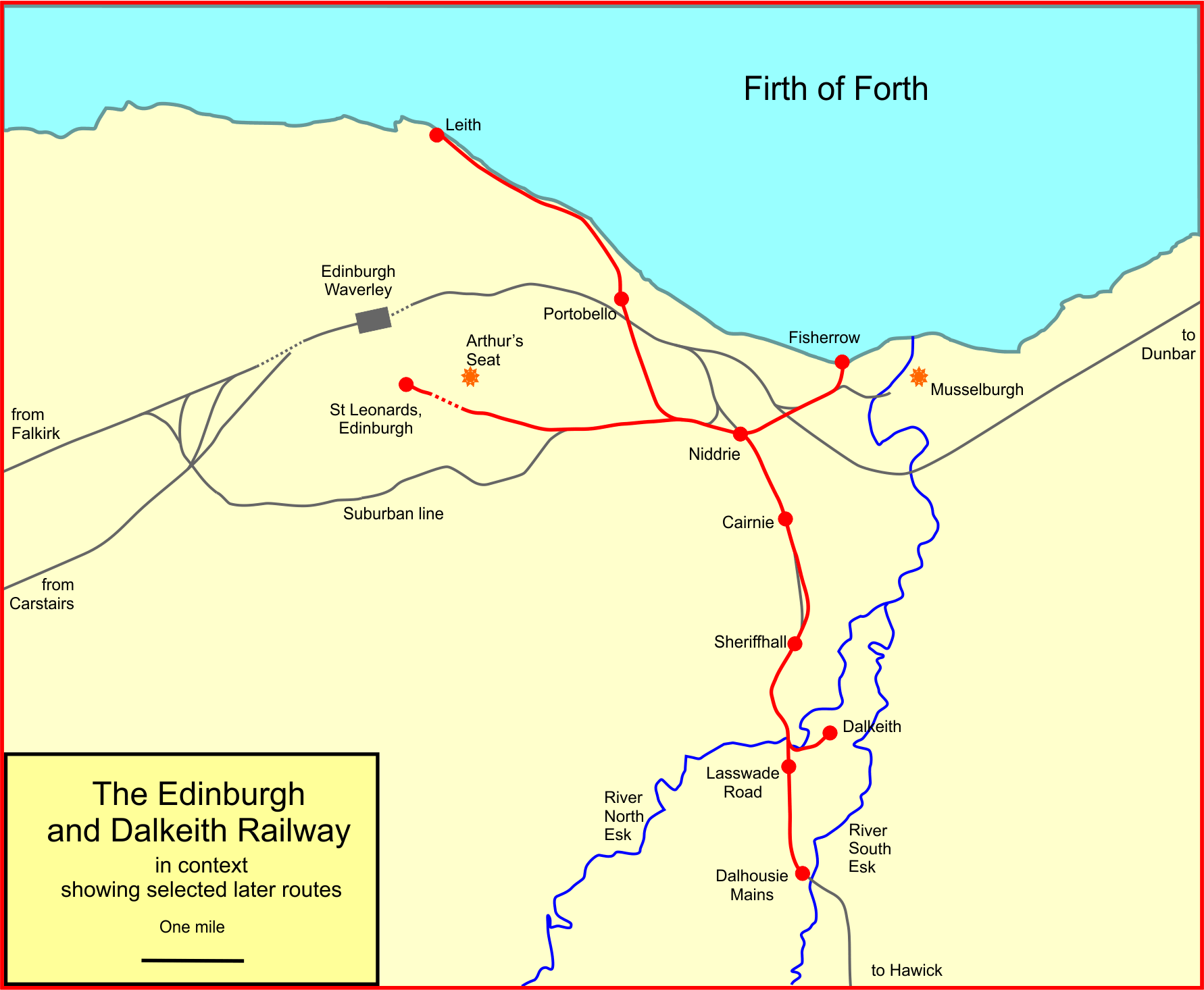
The E&DR in the context of selected later routes

The NBR did not upgrade the E&DR line simply to reach Gorebridge; instead the objective was Carlisle, where the line would join with English railway companies, forming the Waverley Line as a through route between the English and Scottish capitals. It took until 1862 to build a railway across the thinly populated moorland of the Southern Uplands.

The Waverley Line never achieved supremacy against the other Anglo-Scottish routes, remaining as a useful, but secondary, path across southern Scotland. It closed in 1969.

During the British Railways Modernisation Plan of the early 1960s, there was a need to build a large modern mechanised freight marshalling yard to concentrate goods train activity for the Edinburgh area, and this was situated at Millerhill, on the original E&DR main line a little south of the Niddrie junction. This was opened in 1962, but as wagonload freight declined in the UK, it was substantially closed in 1982. (Minor trainload activity remains there.)

Much of the Leith branch remains in use, serving the port area there.

The St Leonard's terminus remained in use for coal and goods traffic until 1968; the depot warehouse dating from the 1830s with its characteristic columns and beams has been preserved. Part of the line from St Leonards to Niddrie remains in use as the Edinburgh Suburban Line, useful as a freight by-pass line for Edinburgh. The last delivery of coal via train can be viewed in the home movie linked to the reference number at the end of this paragraph, which was shot by the son of one of the coal merchants the line served.

Transport Scotland approved the construction to reopen the northern part of the Waverley route, to provide a passenger rail connection between Edinburgh and Tweedbank (called the Borders Railway) which reopened in September 2015

The route will reoccupy the original E&DR alignment from Niddrie to Dalhousie.

== Civil engineering structures ==
=== Braid Burn bridge ===
There is an original cast iron skew bridge over the Braid Burn at the Duddingston Road junction. It was made, erected and painted in March 1831 by the Shotts Iron Company for £133 10s 0d. It has a span of 17 ft 6in and originally carried a double track (for the St Leonard's terminal). There are three beams, the outer beams being L-shaped with a central inverted-T beam. The bridge is one of the first surviving cast iron railway bridges. It carried goods traffic until 1968, and is now in the care of the City of Edinburgh Council.

It was designed by James Jardine (1776–1858).

=== St Leonards Tunnel ===
The tunnel is Scotland's earliest tunnel on a public railway. It was bored (as a cutting was too great an expense) through volcanic rock and lined with Craigleith sandstone, with a semicircular cross-sectional top 20 feet (6.1 m) wide, and 15 feet (4.6 m) high at the crown; it is 566 yards (518 m) long.

Construction took place from 1827 to 1830 and cost about £12,000. Jardine was the engineer and the contractor was Adam Begg. Originally the tunnel was lighted by gas lamps. It is now permanently lit by electricity as part of a cycle path project, and in constant use.

=== Glenesk Bridge, Dalkeith ===
The bridge over the North Esk on the original main line is a fine single-span semicircular ashlar masonry arch with a span of 65 feet (20 m). It was designed by James Jardine and attractively embellished with archivolts, tapering pilasters and extensive curved wingwalls.

It was conserved in 1993 by the Edinburgh Green Belt Trust.

=== Dalhousie (Newbattle) Viaduct ===
When the Marquis of Lothian built his waggonway southwards from the Dalhousie Mains terminal of the E&DR, he had to cross the South Esk river; he did so by a viaduct consisting of 24 spans of timber with three pointed arches in cast iron. It was designed by John Williamson in 1830 and opened on 21 January 1832. It was superseded when the North British Railway were extending southwards; they replaced it with a 23 span masonry viaduct with brick arch rings, completed in 1847 and still in situ.

== Current use ==
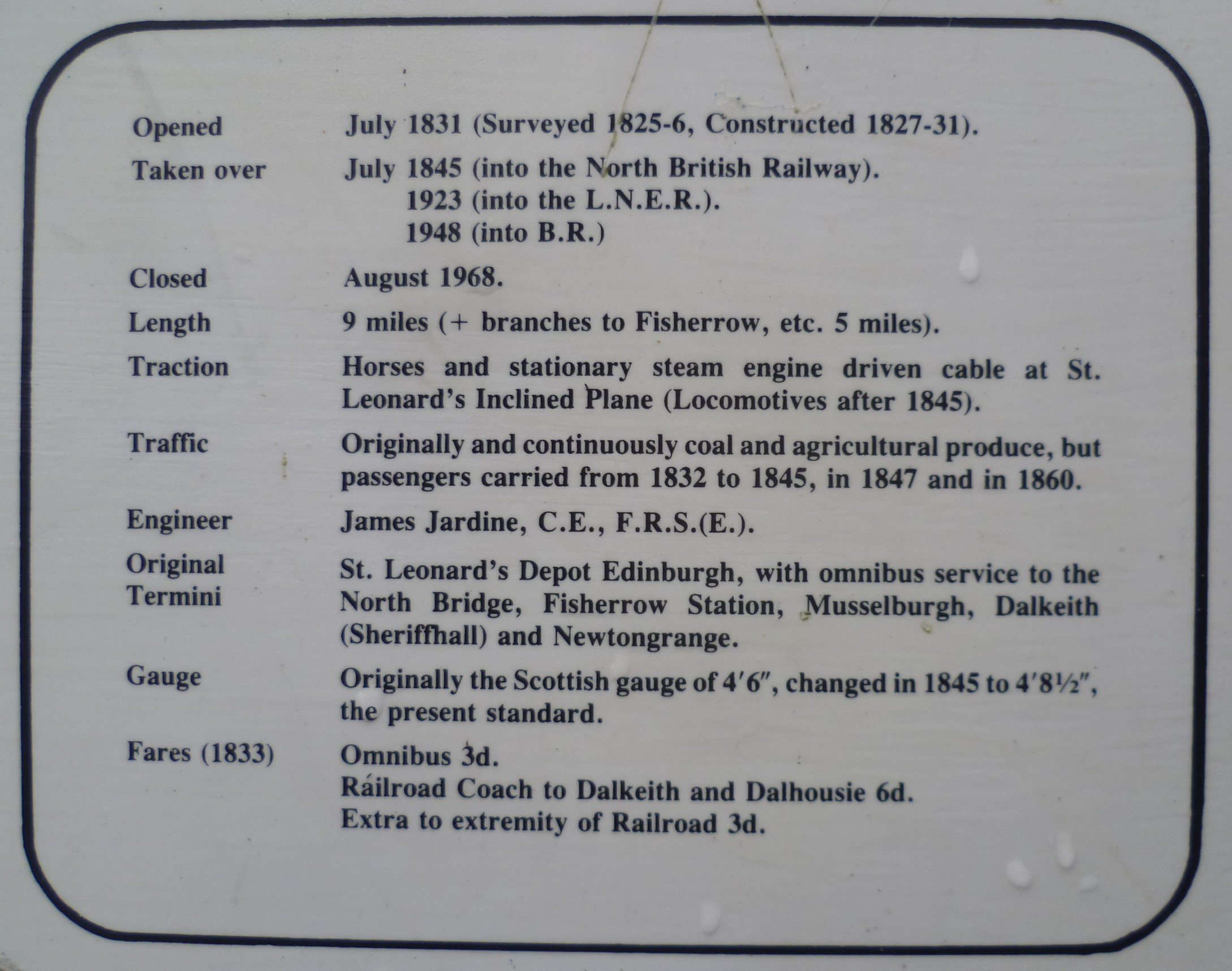
Information plaque at Duddingston

Most of the line's trackbed is now a footpath and cycle path, the latter forming part of National Cycle Route 1 (NCN 1). It links St. Leonards with Duddingston, Niddrie, Craigmillar, Bingham and Brunstane.

== "The Innocent Railway" ==
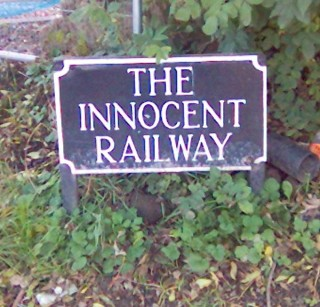
A sign marking the Innocent Railway

There are a number of different versions as to why the line was affectionately nicknamed '"The Innocent Railway". A commonly quoted explanation is that the line never suffered a fatal accident in its construction or operation, and there was a tablet erected naming the railway "The Innocent Railway" on that basis. However this explanation does not hold true as there are records of a number of fatal accidents on the line.

Thomas explains:

Dr Robert Chalmers, reflecting on the E & D trains jogging their leisurely and profitable way round the southern outskirts of Edinburgh and comparing them with trains on more sophisticated railways wrote, 'In the very contemplation of the innocence of the railway you find your heart rejoiced. Only think of a railway having a board at all the stations forbidding the drivers to stop by the way to feed their horses!' The name The Innocent Railway entered the history books and the legend grew that the line was so called because it never killed or injured a passenger. In fact injuries, whether to passengers alighting from trains in motion or to pointsboys taking chances at loops were numerous; the manager himself got a leg injury that left him with a limp for life.

The name in fact seems to have stemmed from the public mistrust, at the time of operation, in steam engines for being too dangerous and too fast (at a time when horses provided the fastest mode of transport) and therefore a horse-drawn railway was seen as "Innocent".

Robertson says:

Its familiar and affectionate soubriquet of the "Innocent Railway" was not due, unless inaccurately, to the legend that no-one was ever killed on it, but rather to an air of old-fashioned unreality which stood by the leisurely horse-drawn tradition long after it had been abandoned elsewhere.

Robert Chalmers, who coined the nickname, gently enjoyed himself at its expense:

By the Innocent Railway you never feel in the least jeopardy; your journey is one of incident and adventure; you can examine the crops as you go along; you have time to hear the news from your companions; and the by-play of the officials is a source of never-failing amusement.

Robertson goes on to observe that a driver was killed in 1840 and two children were killed in 1843 and 1844, citing Parliamentary Papers 1841, 1843 and 1846.

A further explanation was put forward by Munro, although this seems unlikely: "The Company soon became known as the 'innocent Railway' because it did not issue tickets to travellers. At a Board of Enquiry the manager, Mr Rankine, explained that this was because the passengers could not, or would not, make up their minds as to their destination."

A public information plaque at the entrance to the path states that,

You are standing on one of Scotland's pioneering Railways. The Edinburgh and Dalkeith Railway was nicknamed "The Innocent Railway" because it was originally horse-drawn in an age which thought steam engines dangerous. It was built to transport coal from the Dalkeith area to Auld Reekie. To the surprise of the promoters, however, the public rapidly took to this convenient novelty and soon 300,000 passengers were carried annually. Thereafter, passengers became as important as freight to the railways. Open carriages, wagons and converted stagecoaches were the first rolling stock. Among its engineering features were an early tunnel, a cast iron beam bridge and an outstanding timber viaduct on masonry piers. The first two still survive. The viaduct at Thornybank, Dalkeith was finally demolished in the 1960s.

== Red Wheel plaque ==
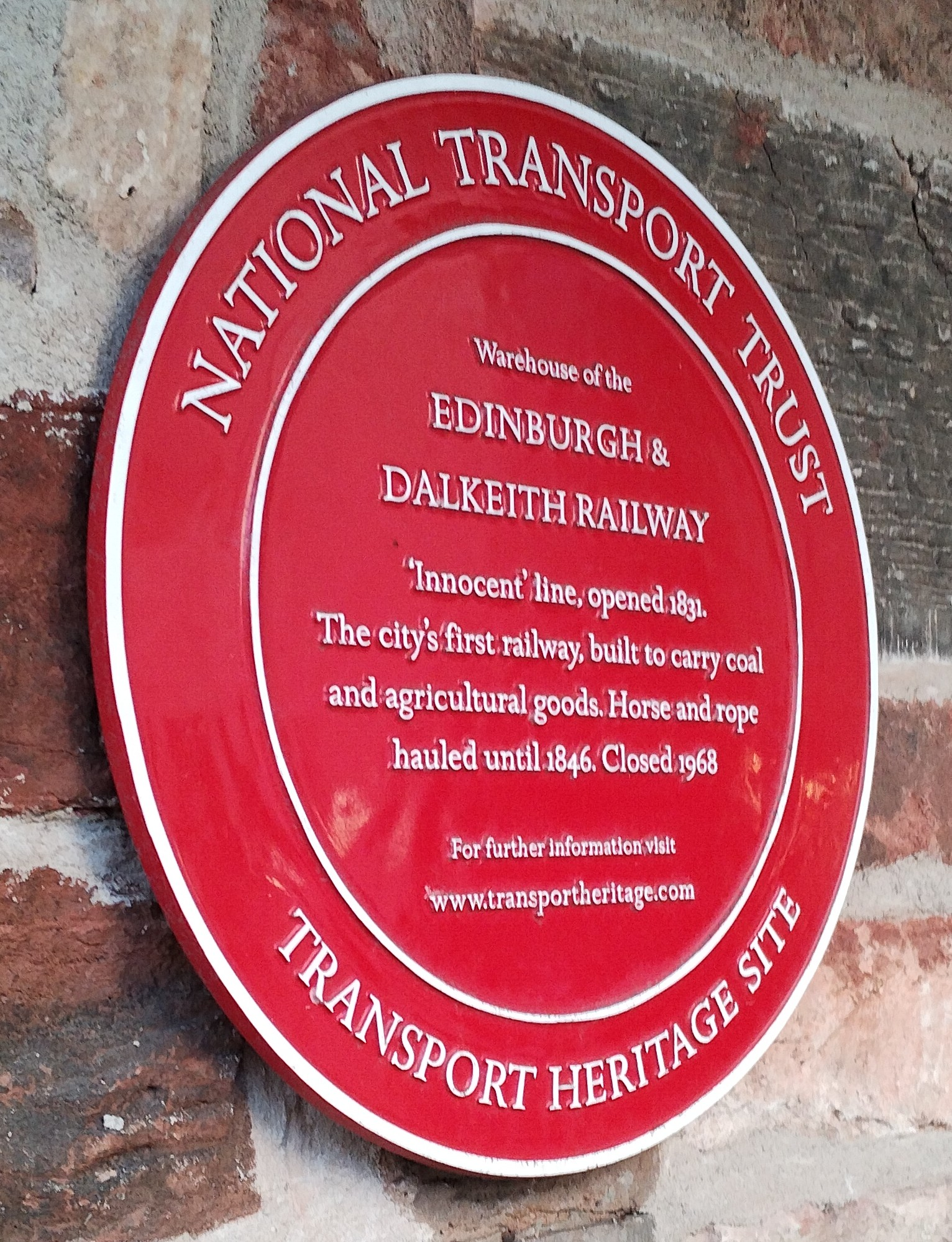

In November 2021, a Red Wheel plaque was unveiled at the Holyrood Distillery, on the site of the former St Leonards station, to mark the railway's importance. Red Wheel plaques are installed by the National Transport Trust to identify sites of significant transport heritage.

== Sources ==
- Awdry, Christopher (1990). Encyclopaedia of British Railway Companies. Sparkford: Patrick Stephens Ltd. ISBN 1-8526-0049-7. OCLC 19514063. CN 8983.
- Jowett, Alan (March 1989). Jowett's Railway Atlas of Great Britain and Ireland: From Pre-Grouping to the Present Day (1st ed.). Sparkford: Patrick Stephens Ltd. ISBN 978-1-85260-086-0. OCLC 22311137.
- Lewin, Henry Grote (1925). Early British Railways. A short history of their origin & development 1801-1844. London: The Locomotive Publishing Co Ltd. OCLC 11064369.
- Historic Environment Scotland (2019) The Innocent Railway
- Thomas, John (1971). A Regional History of the Railways of Great Britain. Vol. VI Scotland: The Lowlands and the Borders (1st ed.). Newton Abbot, Devon: David & Charles. ISBN 0-7153-5408-6. OCLC 16198685.
- Thomas, John; Paterson, Rev A. J. S. (1984). A Regional History of the Railways of Great Britain. Vol. VI Scotland: The Lowlands and the Borders (2nd ed.). Newton Abbott, Devon: David & Charles. ISBN 0-9465-3712-7. OCLC 12521072.
- Popplewell, Lawrence (1989). A Gazetteer of the Railway Contractors and Engineers of Scotland, 1831 - 1914. (Vol. 1: 1831 - 1870 and Vol. 2: 1871 - 1914). Bournemouth: Melledgen Press. ISBN 0-9066-3714-7. OCLC 19888025.
