= Waverley Railway (Scotland) Act 2006 =

Act of the Scottish Parliament

- Act of the Scottish Parliament
- Scottish Parliament
- Long title: An Act of the Scottish Parliament to authorise the reconstruction of a railway from a point in Midlothian immediately south of Newcraighall in the City of Edinburgh to Tweedbank in Scottish Borders, including stations at Shawfair, Eskbank, Newtongrange, Gorebridge, Stow, Galashiels and Tweedbank; to make provision concerning planning agreements and developer contributions relating to the railway; and for connected purposes.
- Citation: 2006 asp 13
- Territorial extent: Scotland

Dates
- Royal assent: 24 July 2006

Status: Current legislation

Text of statute as originally enacted

Text of the Waverley Railway (Scotland) Act 2006 as in force today (including any amendments) within the United Kingdom, from legislation.gov.uk.

The Waverley Railway (Scotland) Act 2006 (asp 13) is an act of the Scottish Parliament. It authorises the construction of the Borders Railway from a point in Midlothian immediately south of Newcraighall in the City of Edinburgh to Tweedbank in the Scottish Borders, including stations at Shawfair, Eskbank, Newtongrange, Gorebridge, Stow of Wedale, Galashiels and Tweedbank. The act extended the Waverley line by 35 miles. It makes provision concerning planning agreements and developer contributions relating to the railway.

== Initial proposals ==
The Secretary of State for Scotland Donald Dewar, later First Minister of Scotland, launched a feasibility study in 1999 into the re-opening of the rail link which had been closed in 1969. This led to the publication of the feasibility study in February 2000 by the Scottish Executive's Transport & Environment Minister Sarah Boyack. The study concluded that a regular passenger rail service would be able to cover its operating costs.

== Private lobbying ==
The Campaign for Borders Rail was established independently of Executive plans to promote the link. The Campaign commissioned public surveys and, among other things, identified the popularity of a new station at Stow in the Borders.

== Public promotion ==
The project was promoted in a number of ways including a roadshow in July 2002. This was set up in various locations in Edinburgh, Midlothian and the Scottish Borders. As well as presenting the detail of the proposed project, the roadshow provided an opportunity to receive concerns and objections.

== Objections ==
Main objections centred on potential noise levels; and lack of contactability with the developers. Residents of Still Haugh at Fountainhall in Edinburgh objected on many grounds. These included the effects of noise and vibrations on quality of life, property value, property stability, and local wildlife. Residents of Victoria Gardens at Newtongrange in Edinburgh also objected to projected noise levels and the inadequate proposals for barrier fences.

== Passage through Parliament ==
In June 2006, the Waverley Railway (Scotland) Act 2006 was passed by the Scottish Parliament. It proposed re-opening the line as far as Tweedbank, just south of the burgh of Galashiels. The bill was given royal assent in July 2006.

== See also ==
- List of acts of the Scottish Parliament from 1999
- Waverley Line
