= Gorebridge railway station =

Railway station in Midlothian, Scotland

Gorebridge
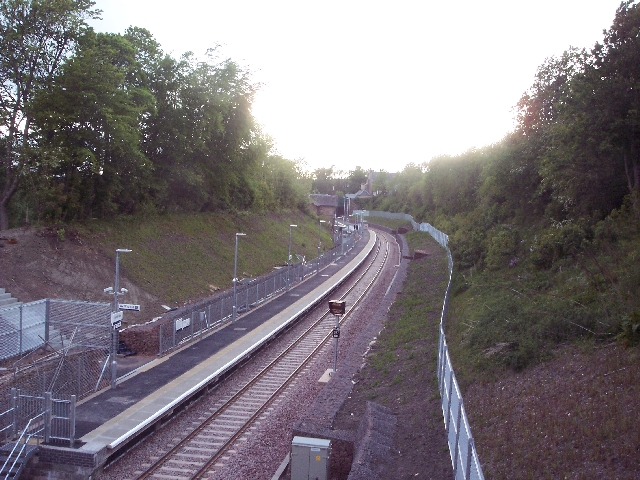

General information
- Location: Gorebridge, Midlothian; Scotland
- Coordinates: 55°50′25″N 3°02′48″W
- Owner: Network Rail
- Manager: ScotRail
- Platforms: 1

Other information
- Station code: GBG

History
- Original company: Edinburgh and Hawick Railway
- Pre-grouping: North British Railway
- Post-grouping: London and North Eastern Railway; British Rail (Scottish Region)

Key dates
- 14 July 1847: Opened
- 6 January 1969: Closed
- 6 September 2015: Reopened

Passengers
- 2020/21: ▼11,276
- 2021/22: ▲60,026
- 2022/23: ▲92,486
- 2023/24: ▲122,968
- 2024/25: ▼121,090
Location
- Location within Midlothian
Notes
- Passenger statistics from the Office of Rail and Road

Gorebridge is a railway station on the Borders Railway, which runs between Edinburgh Waverley and Tweedbank. The station, situated 11 miles 77 chains (19 km) south-east of Edinburgh Waverley, serves the town of Gorebridge in Midlothian, Scotland. It is owned by Network Rail and managed by ScotRail.

== History ==
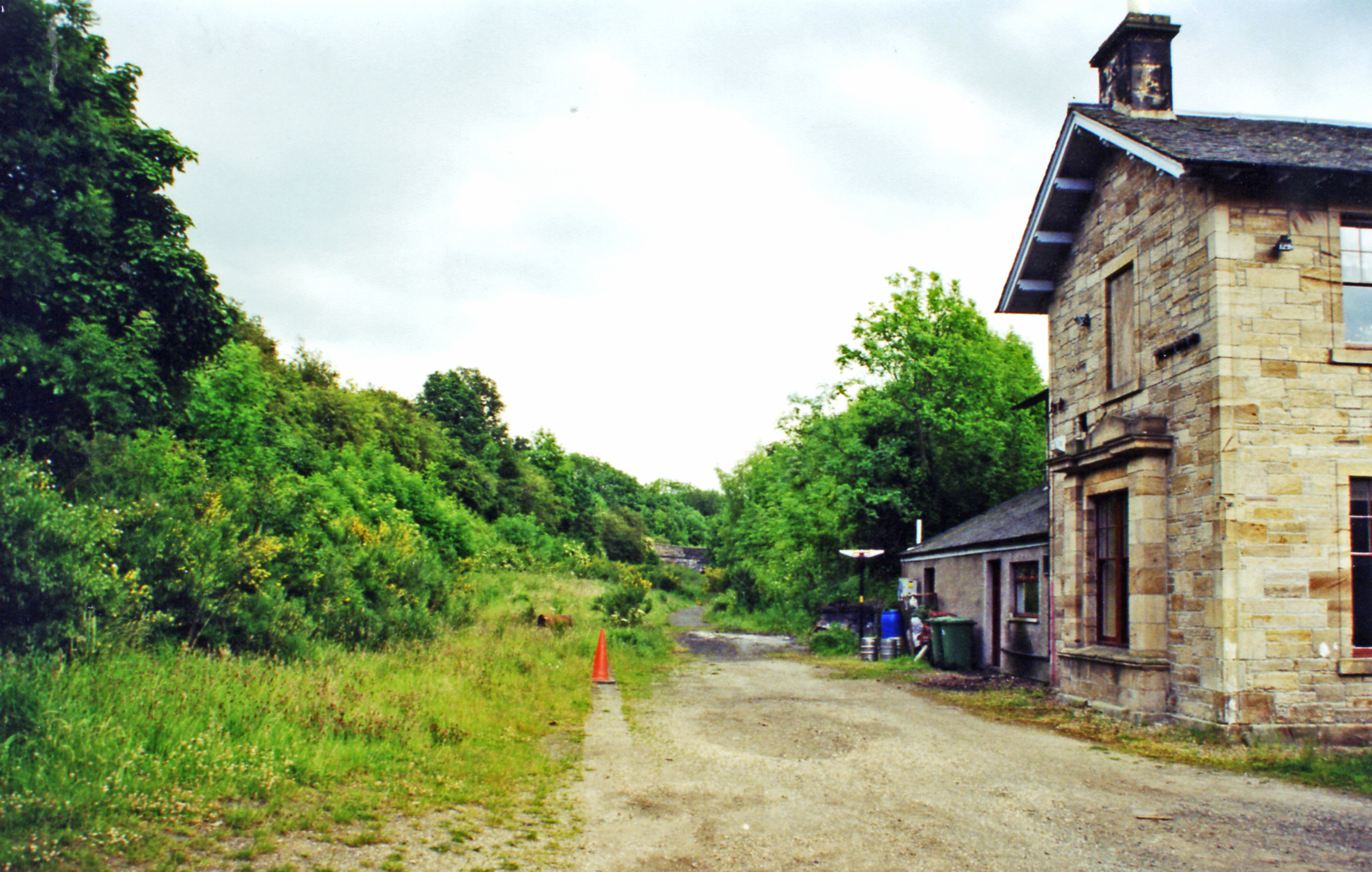
Looking south-east towards Galashiels. Photographed in June 2000, prior to the station's reopening.

The original station opened on 14 July 1847 as part of the North British Railway's new line that was to reach Hawick and Carlisle. The station closed to passengers on 6 January 1969 as part of the overall closure of the Waverley Route between Edinburgh and Carlisle.

The station and line reopened on 6 September 2015 on the new Borders Railway a new project reopening part of the old Waverley Line between Edinburgh and Tweedbank, just beyond Galashiels. The new construction work was undertaken by BAM Nuttall on behalf of Network Rail and Transport Scotland.

== Services ==
As of the May 2021 timetable change, the station is served by an hourly service between Edinburgh Waverley and Tweedbank, with a half-hourly service operating at peak times (Monday to Saturday). Some peak time trains continue to Glenrothes with Thornton. All services are operated by ScotRail.

Rolling stock used: Class 158 Express Sprinter and Class 170 Turbostar

Preceding station	National Rail	Following station
Newtongrange	ScotRail; Borders Railway	Stow
	Historical railways	
Newtongrange	North British Railway; Waverley Route	Fushiebridge

== Sources ==
- Butt, R. V. J. (October 1995). The Directory of Railway Stations: details every public and private passenger station, halt, platform and stopping place, past and present (1st ed.). Sparkford: Patrick Stephens Ltd. ISBN 978-1-85260-508-7. OCLC 60251199. OL 11956311M.
- Jowett, Alan (March 1989). Jowett's Railway Atlas of Great Britain and Ireland: From Pre-Grouping to the Present Day (1st ed.). Sparkford: Patrick Stephens Ltd. ISBN 978-1-85260-086-0. OCLC 22311137.
- Thomas, John (1971). A Regional History of the Railways of Great Britain. Vol. VI Scotland: The Lowlands and the Borders (1st ed.). Newton Abbot, Devon: David & Charles. ISBN 0-7153-5408-6. OCLC 16198685.
- Thomas, John; Paterson, Rev A. J. S. (1984). A Regional History of the Railways of Great Britain. Vol. VI Scotland: The Lowlands and the Borders (2nd ed.). Newton Abbott, Devon: David & Charles. ISBN 0-9465-3712-7. OCLC 12521072.
