= Tynehead railway station =

Disused railway station in Pathhead, Midlothian

Tynehead
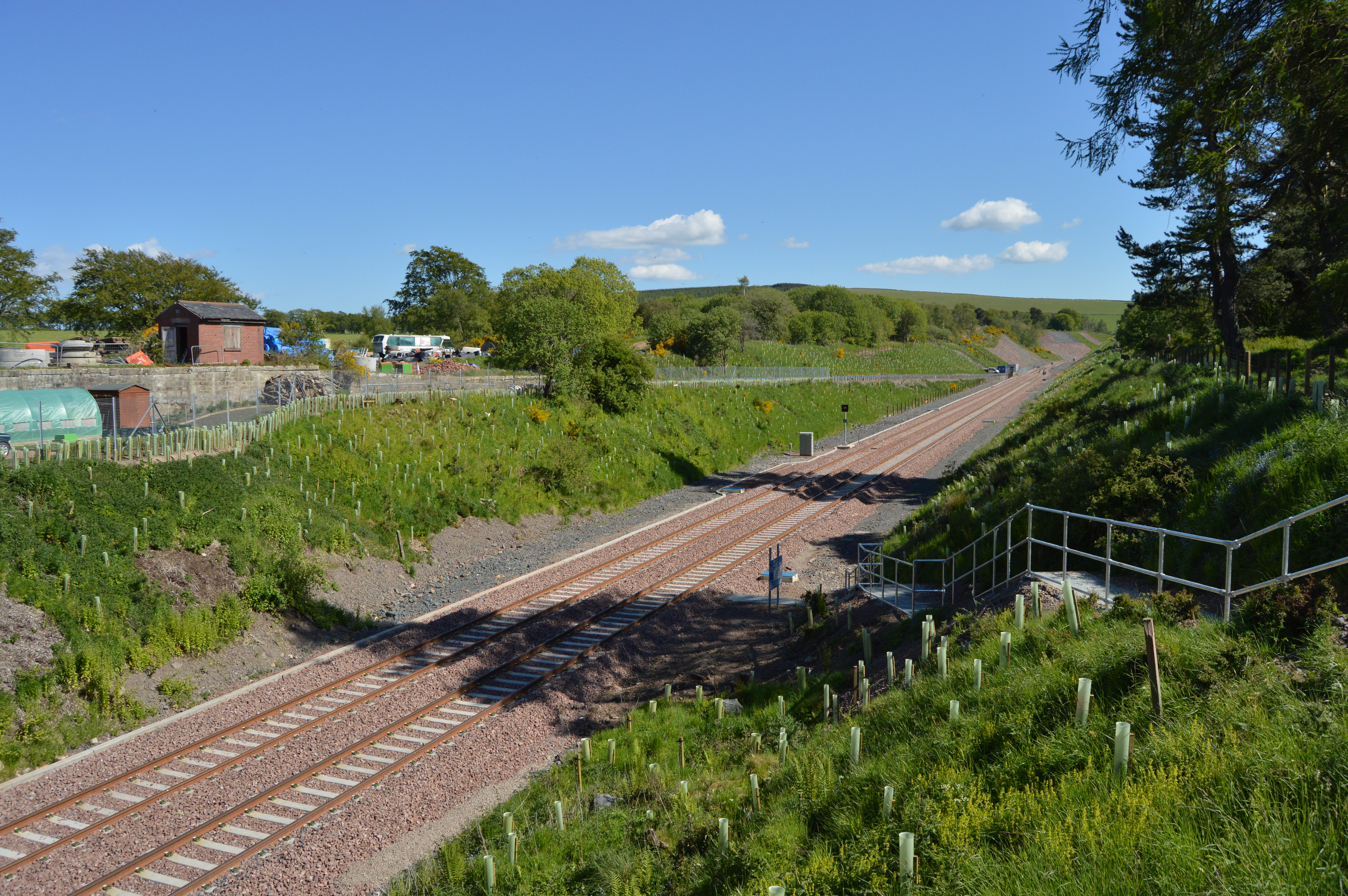
- Remains of Tynehead station site in 2015, after reinstatement of the railway line

General information
- Location: Pathhead, Midlothian; Scotland
- Coordinates: 55.8218°N 2.9696°W
- Grid reference: NT393591
- Platforms: 2

Other information
- Status: Disused

History
- Original company: North British Railway
- Pre-grouping: North British Railway
- Post-grouping: LNER

Key dates
- 4 August 1848: Opened as Tyne Head
- March 1874: Name changed to Tynehead
- 6 January 1969: Closed
Location

Tynehead railway station served the village of Pathhead, Midlothian, Scotland from 1848 to 1969 on the Waverley Line.

== History ==
View of the former station platforms during Borders Railway works

The station opened on 4 August 1848 by the North British Railway. It was situated south of the B6367. The station's original name was Tyne Head, although this was changed to Tynehead in March 1874. The goods yard consisted of three parallel sidings, one serving a cattle dock and a fourth running diagonally across the yard towards the entrance, where there was a weighbridge and weigh office. Goods services ceased on 28 December 1964; the sidings were quickly lifted soon after. On 27 March 1967 the station was downgraded to an unstaffed halt, although the suffix 'halt' never appeared in any of the timetables. The station was closed to passengers and, due to no goods traffic, completely on 6 January 1969.

In September 2015, the Waverley Route partially reopened as part of the Borders Railway. Although the railway passes through the original Tynehead station, it was not reopened.

Preceding station	Historical railways	Following station
Fushiebridge; Line open, station closed	North British Railway; Waverley Route	Heriot; Line open, station closed
