= Newcraighall =

Suburb of Edinburgh, Scotland

Coordinates: 55.934469°N 3.0888°W

Newcraighall: Scottish Gaelic: Talla na Creige Nuadh; Scots: Newcraighauch
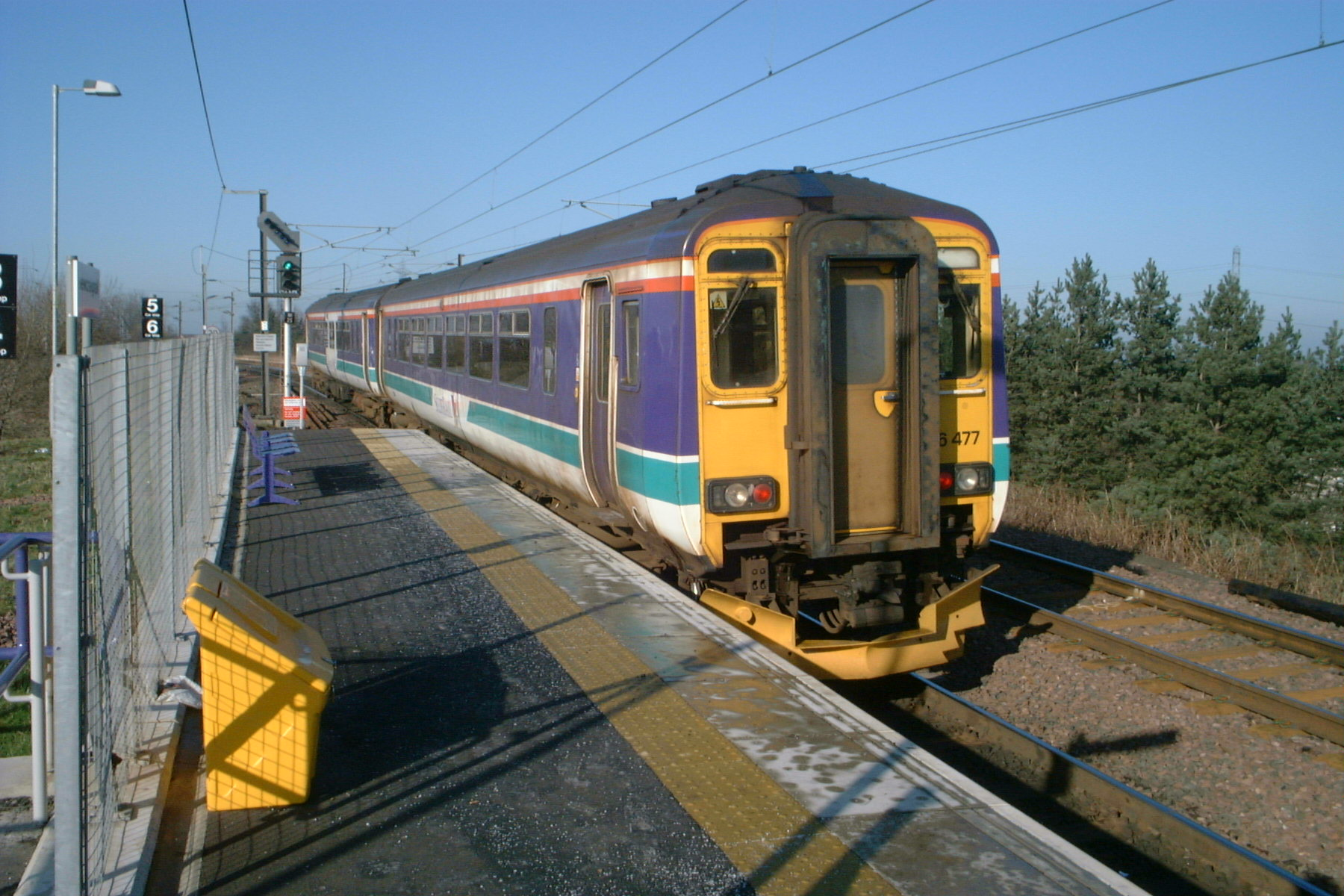
- Newcraighall Station

- Location within the City of Edinburgh council area Location within Scotland
- OS grid reference: NT320719
- Community council: Craigmillar
- Council area: City of Edinburgh
- Lieutenancy area: Edinburgh
- Country: Scotland
- Sovereign state: United Kingdom
- Post town: MUSSELBURGH
- Postcode district: EH21
- Post town: EDINBURGH
- Postcode district: EH15
- Dialling code: 0131
- Police: Scotland
- Fire: Scottish
- Ambulance: Scottish
- UK Parliament: Edinburgh East and Musselburgh
- Scottish Parliament: Edinburgh Eastern, Musselburgh and Tranent

Newcraighall (Scots: Newcraighauch, Scottish Gaelic: Talla na Creige Nuadh) is a South-Eastern suburb of Edinburgh, Scotland. A former mining village, its prosperity was based on the Midlothian coalfields. The Newcraighall pit was known as 'Klondyke' and closed in the 1960s, work transferring to nearby Bilston Glen and in particular the last-to-close (1998) Monktonhall pit. The village had a church, a Co-op and a miners' club (demolished after a fire on 15 July 2009) and bowling green. Newcraighall now plays host to an out-of-town shopping complex, Fort Kinnaird, previously known as Edinburgh Fort (south of Newcraighall Road) and Kinnaird Park (north). Today, the retail park is still commonly referred to as "The Fort" by residents.

Newcraighall railway station is on the newly reopened Borders Railway which runs from Edinburgh to Tweedbank and was formerly part of the Waverley Route to Carlisle its closure (Closed 5 January 1969) following the Beeching Report in 1963.

Newcraighall was the setting for the film My Childhood by Bill Douglas. There is a plaque to Douglas in the village. The village also contained a bridge that features in a scene from the film, however it was demolished in 2015. The village also contains a sculpture by Jake Harvey which celebrates the mining tradition of the area. On Newcraighall Road is the Craigmillar Arts Centre, with a Woman of Achievement plaque for Helen Crummy, who lived in Newcraighall for many years.
