= Newcraighall railway station =

Railway station in the City of Edinburgh council area, Scotland

Newcraighall Scottish Gaelic: Talla na Creige Nuadh
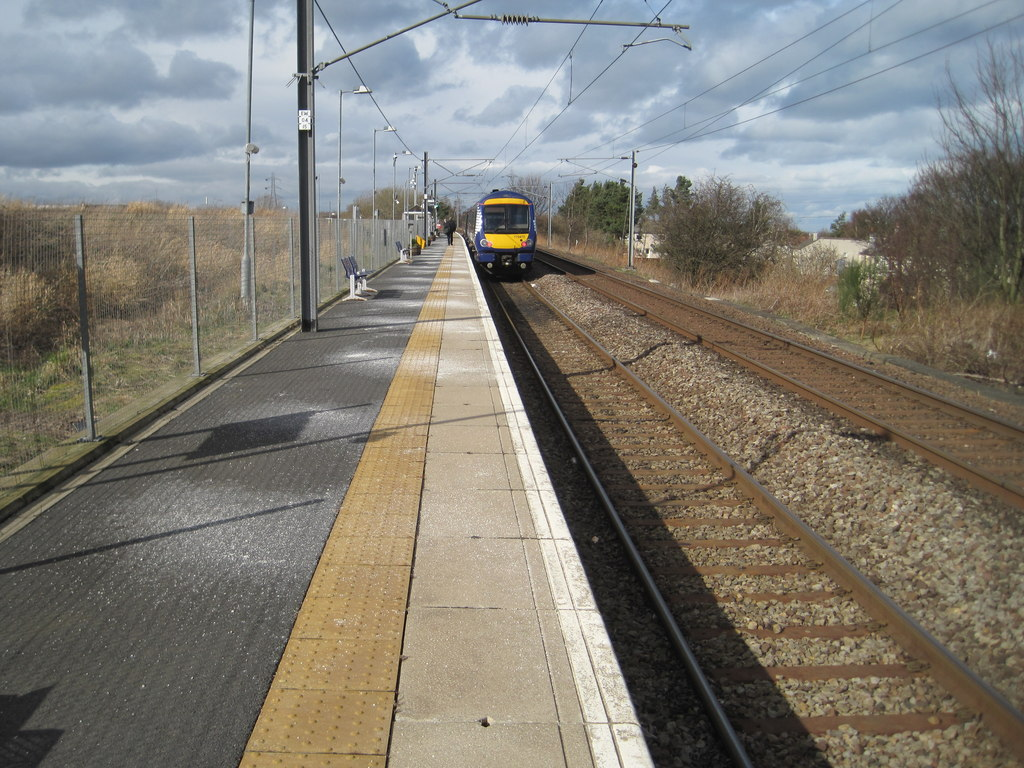

General information
- Location: Newcraighall, City of Edinburgh; Scotland
- Coordinates: 55°55′59″N 3°05′27″W
- Grid reference: NT319716
- Owner: Network Rail
- Manager: ScotRail
- Platforms: 1
- Tracks: 2

Other information
- Station code: NEW

History
- Original company: Railtrack

Key dates
- 3 June 2002: Opened

Passengers
- 2020/21: ▼32,052
- 2021/22: ▲0.121 million
- 2022/23: ▲0.178 million
- 2023/24: ▲0.250 million
- 2024/25: ▼0.233 million
Location
- Location within the City of Edinburgh council area
Notes
- Passenger statistics from the Office of Rail and Road

Newcraighall is a railway station on the Borders Railway in Scotland, which runs between Edinburgh Waverley and Tweedbank. The station, situated close to the A1 road 4 miles 54 chains (8 km) south-east of Edinburgh Waverley, serves the suburb of Newcraighall and other parts of south-eastern Edinburgh such as Craigmillar and Niddrie. It is owned by Network Rail and managed by ScotRail.

== History ==
The station was opened by Railtrack on 3 June 2002, and served as a terminus station for the Edinburgh Crossrail. Though fully within the City of Edinburgh local authority area, it is located only a few yards from its boundaries with both East Lothian and Midlothian.

Following the opening of the Borders Railway on 6 September 2015, the line was extended 30 miles 60 chains (49 km) south-east towards Galashiels and Tweedbank. The station now serves as a park and ride facility into central Edinburgh for commuters living in parts of East Lothian, Midlothian and the Scottish Borders.

Though the Waverley Route never had a station at this location, one did exist briefly at nearby Niddrie. It was opened in June 1843 by the Edinburgh and Dalkeith Railway, operating intermittently until the station's ultimate closure in January 1869.

== Services ==
As of the December 2022 timetable change, the station is served Mon-Sat by a half-hourly service between Edinburgh Waverley and Tweedbank. Services are hourly only during the evenings and all day on Sundays. All services are operated by ScotRail.

Rolling stock used: Class 158 Express Sprinter and Class 170 Turbostar

Preceding station	National Rail	Following station
Brunstane	ScotRail; Borders Railway	Shawfair
	Historical railways	
Brunstane	ScotRail; Edinburgh Crossrail	Terminus
