= Shawfair railway station =

Railway station in Midlothian, Scotland

Shawfair
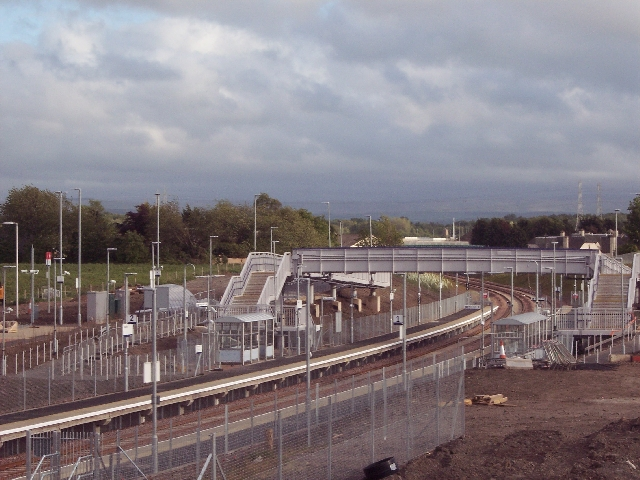

General information
- Location: Shawfair, Midlothian; Scotland
- Coordinates: 55°55′04″N 3°05′25″W
- Grid reference: NT318699
- Owner: Network Rail
- Manager: ScotRail
- Platforms: 2

Other information
- Station code: SFI

History
- Original company: Network Rail

Key dates
- 6 September 2015: Opened

Passengers
- 2020/21: ▼6,702
- 2021/22: ▲27,616
- 2022/23: ▲44,362
- 2023/24: ▲64,520
- 2024/25: ▲72,472
Location
- Location within Midlothian
Notes
- Passenger statistics from the Office of Rail and Road

Shawfair is a railway station on the Borders Railway, which runs between Edinburgh Waverley and Tweedbank. The station, situated 5 miles 64 chains (9.33 kilometres) southeast of Edinburgh Waverley, serves the villages of Danderhall and Shawfair in Midlothian, Scotland. It is owned by Network Rail and managed by ScotRail.

== History ==
At this point the line does not follow the old Waverley Route via Millerhill, the trackbed of which was severed by the construction of the Edinburgh City Bypass in the 1980s.

The construction work was undertaken by BAM Nuttall opening on 6 September 2015.

== Services ==
As of the May 2021 timetable change, the station is served by an hourly service between Edinburgh Waverley and Tweedbank, with a half-hourly service operating at peak times (Monday to Saturday). Some peak time trains continue to Glenrothes with Thornton. All services are operated by ScotRail.

Rolling stock used: Class 158 Express Sprinter and Class 170 Turbostar

== Notes ==
Preceding station	National Rail	Following station
Newcraighall	ScotRail; Borders Railway	Eskbank
