= Shawfair =

Coordinates: 55.9153502°N 3.0884242°W

- Location within Midlothian
- Population: 4,155
- OS grid reference: NT332669
- Council area: Midlothian
- Lieutenancy area: Midlothian
- Country: Scotland
- Sovereign state: United Kingdom
- Post town: DALKEITH
- Postcode district: EH22
- Dialling code: 0131
- Police: Scotland
- Fire: Scottish
- Ambulance: Scottish
- UK Parliament: Midlothian
- Scottish Parliament: Midlothian North and Musselburgh

Shawfair is a 21st century development, primarily residential in character, under construction in Midlothian, Scotland, near to the existing village of Danderhall and the hamlets of Newton and Millerhill, which lie just outside the eastern boundary of the city of Edinburgh. It is to be built on the site of the former Monktonhall Colliery. The name is derived from a local farm steading of the same name.

== History ==
In 2005, Midlothian Council, Edinburgh City Council and Miller Developments created a joint venture, Shawfair Developments Ltd, to work on the scheme. The Minewater Project, an experimental scheme to provide geothermal energy was to be based in Shawfair; however the business case was deemed not economically viable. In 2009 Miller pulled out due to market conditions, putting the development in doubt. In November 2010, plans for the settlement were put on hold and the joint venture between Edinburgh City Council and Midlothian Council was dissolved.

The Shawfair project was later restarted in 2014 under the name Shawfair LLP, a joint venture between Mactaggart & Mickel and Buccleuch Property. The £200m development of Shawfair, expected to take 15 years, was forecast to provide a projected net economic output of around £32.2 million per annum during development and £99.9 million per annum thereafter.

The site encompasses 700 acres (280 ha). The £200 million development will create a new residential and commercial centre with around 4,000 new homes, two primary schools, a secondary school and 1,000,000 sq ft (93,000 m^{2}) of commercial and retail space. The first phases of commercial and house building were progressed in 2018 and 2019.

The Shawfair railway station on the newly created Borders Railway, which opened in September 2015, will connect the new town centre with Edinburgh city centre.

== Shawfair Park ==
In late 2007, near the planned site of Shawfair, construction work began on Shawfair Park, a new business park with approximately 25,000 m^{2} (270,000 sq ft) of office space and ancillary uses next to the new Sheriffhall park and ride. The development includes a private hospital, Spire Shawfair Park, complementing an existing facility in Edinburgh's Murrayfield.
