= Fushiebridge railway station =

Disused railway station in Fushiebridge, Gorebridge

Fushiebridge

General information
- Location: Fushiebridge, Gorebridge; Scotland
- Coordinates: 55.8319°N 3.0354°W
- Grid reference: NT352603
- Platforms: 2

Other information
- Status: Disused

History
- Opened: 12 July 1847; 178 years ago
- Closed: 4 October 1943; 82 years ago (passengers); 1 January 1959; 66 years ago (completely)
- Original company: North British Railway
- Pre-grouping: North British Railway
- Post-grouping: LNER
Location

Fushiebridge railway station served the area of Fushiebridge, Gorebridge, from 1847 to 1959 on the Waverley Route.

== History ==
The station opened on 12 July 1847, by the North British Railway. The station was situated to the north of an unnamed minor road. There was a goods yard to the south of the station and two private sidings, one to the west over a river and one to two of the Vogrie group of collieries with a steep loco-worked incline. The colliery was near Esperston Lime Quarry, as well as a newer signal box and the northern sidings. The station closed in 1943 to passengers but was used for railway staff until 1959.

== Rail accident ==
A fatal accident happened on 10 January 1937 when a shunter driver, William Patrick Egan, died during a shunter operation. He was stuck between the engine and the wagon buffers. He was 36 years old when he died.

Preceding station	Historical railways	Following station
Gorebridge; Line and station open	North British Railway; Waverley Route	Tynehead; Line open, station closed
