= Newbattle Viaduct =

Railway bridge in Midlothian, Scotland

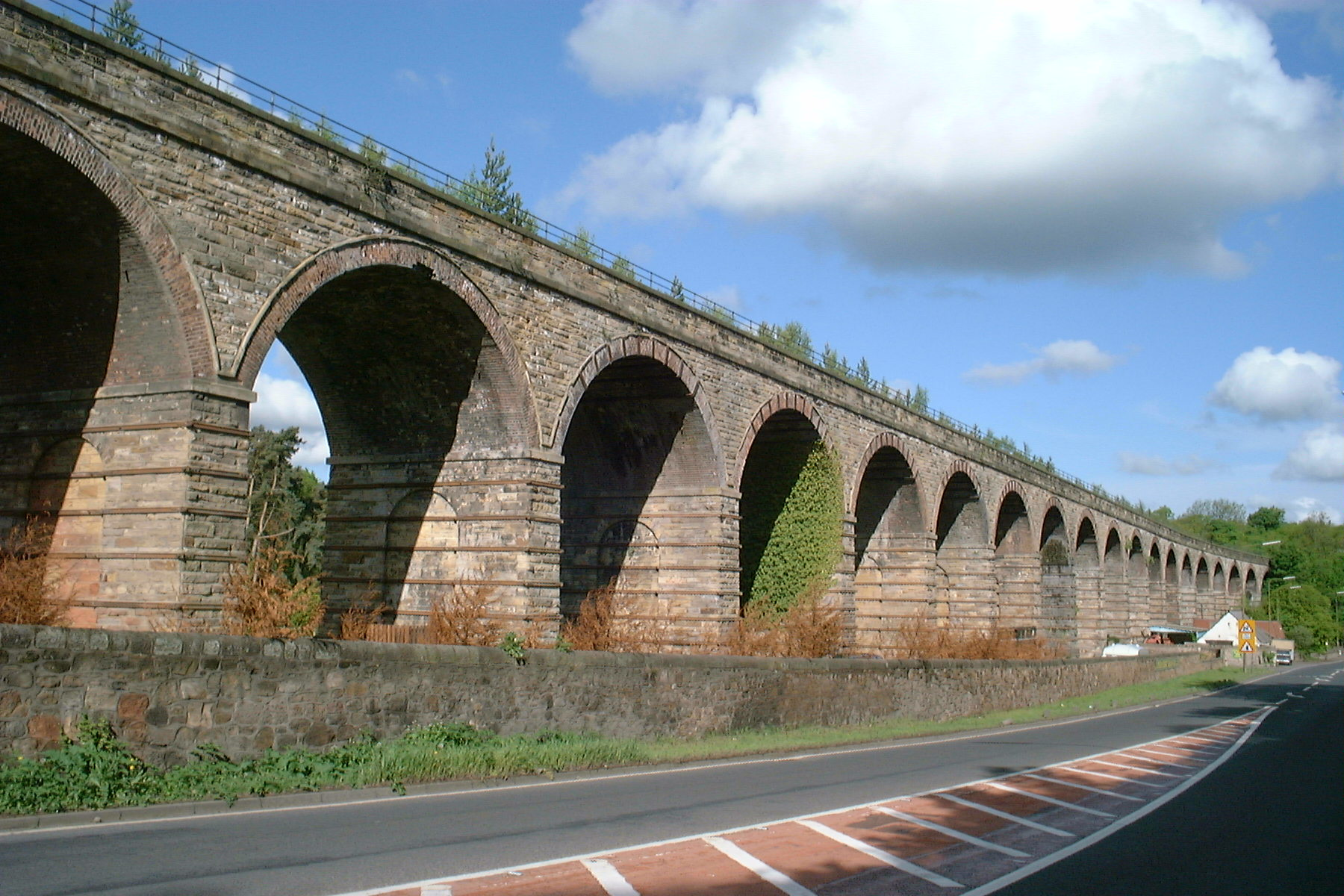
- Coordinates: 55.872°N 3.077°W
- Carries: Borders Railway
- Crosses: River South Esk; A7

Characteristics
- Material: Stone
- No. of spans: 23

History
- Designer: John Miller
- Construction end: 1847

Listed Building – Category B
- Official name: Lothianbridge, Newbattle Viaduct
- Designated: 21 January 1971
- Reference no.: LB14544

Location
- Interactive map of Newbattle Viaduct

The Newbattle Viaduct, sometimes also called the Lothianbridge, Newtongrange or Dalhousie Viaduct, carries the Borders Railway, which opened in 2015, over the River South Esk near Newtongrange, Midlothian, Scotland.

== Original viaduct ==
The original viaduct was built by the Marquess of Lothian to extend the Edinburgh and Dalkeith Railway from Dalhousie Mains to his coal pits at Arniston. It was constructed of stone piers to support the wooden structure of the bridge, and had a total length of around 1,200 feet (370 m). To cross the river it used three cast iron spans in the form of Gothic arches, each 65 feet (20 m) long, with the main one being 70 feet (21 m) high. It opened in 1831.

== History ==
The present viaduct was opened in 1849 by the Edinburgh and Hawick Railway to carry the Waverley Line, running between Edinburgh and Carlisle. The viaduct was designed by John Miller.

It was closed to passenger traffic in 1969 as a result of the Beeching cuts, and to freight in 1972. It was reopened in 2015 for the Borders Railway line between Edinburgh and Tweedbank. Some work was required on the viaduct to prepare it for the reopening of the railway, although it was still structurally sound.

== Design ==
It has 23 nearly semicircular arches, with 14 spans of 39 feet (12 m), seven of 38 feet (12 m), one of 44 feet (13 m) and one of 43 feet 10 inches (13.36 m). The piers are 8 feet (2.4 m) thick at the foundations, tapering to 6 feet (1.8 m) at the springing of the arches. The arches are lined with three layers of bricks. Most, but not all the arches are reinforced with iron strapping, as are nearly all of the piers. The long pier which sits in the river has a large cutwater.

The last arch at the south end is a skew arch to accommodate the A7 public road, which runs parallel to the viaduct before cutting underneath it. The viaduct is nearly straight, but with a slight curve at the northern end where it crosses the river. To the south of the viaduct is a caravan park.

== See also ==
- List of bridges in Scotland
