= Madge Elliot (activist) =

Scottish rail campaigner

MBE Madge Elliot
- Born: Matilda Callaghan Robson; 20 June 1928; Hawick, Scotland
- Died: 25 May 2024 (aged 95); Hawick, Scotland
- Occupation: Rail campaigner

Matilda (Madge) Callaghan Elliot (née Robson; 20 June 1928 – 25 May 2024) was a Scottish rail activist.

== Biography ==
Elliot worked as a tennis coach by profession. Elliot campaigned against the closure of the old Waverley Line, which ran between Edinburgh, Hawick and Carlisle, before it closed in the 1960s due to the Beeching cuts. She relied on the train to Edinburgh when she was visiting her then three-year-old son in hospital. In 1968, she and her local MP David Steel delivered a petition to Harold Wilson on the route.

In 1999, she was given an MBE for her services to lawn tennis in the Scottish Borders. The same year she helped found the Campaign for Borders Rail. In 2015, a train on the Borders Railway was named in her honour. She was the first passenger on the new line. In 2017, she was part of an exhibition on accessibility at the Scottish Parliament.

Elliot died in May 2024, at the age of 95. She had Alzheimer's disease.
