= Galashiels railway station =

Railway station in Scottish Borders, Scotland

Galashiels
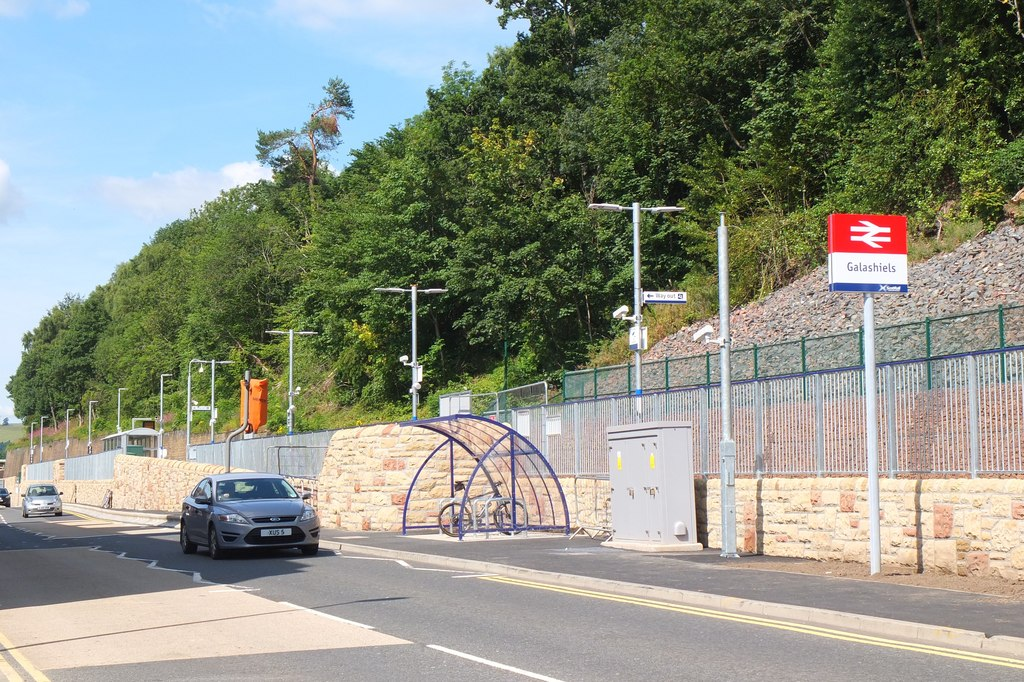

General information
- Location: Galashiels, Scottish Borders; Scotland
- Coordinates: 55°37′04″N 2°48′20″W
- Grid reference: NT493361
- Owner: Network Rail
- Manager: ScotRail
- Platforms: 1

Other information
- Station code: GAL

History
- Original company: Edinburgh and Hawick Railway
- Pre-grouping: North British Railway
- Post-grouping: London and North Eastern Railway; British Rail (Scottish Region)

Key dates
- 20 February 1849: Opened
- 5 January 1969: Closed
- 6 September 2015: Reopened at a different site

Passengers
- 2020/21: ▼37,486
- 2021/22: ▲0.187 million
- 2022/23: ▲0.269 million
- 2023/24: ▲0.320 million
- 2024/25: ▼0.309 million
Location
- Location within Scottish Borders
Notes
- Passenger statistics from the Office of Rail and Road

Galashiels is a railway station on the Borders Railway, which runs between Edinburgh Waverley and Tweedbank. The station, situated 33 miles 22 chains (53.6 km) south-east of Edinburgh Waverley, serves the town of Galashiels in Scottish Borders, Scotland. It is owned by Network Rail and managed by ScotRail.

== History ==
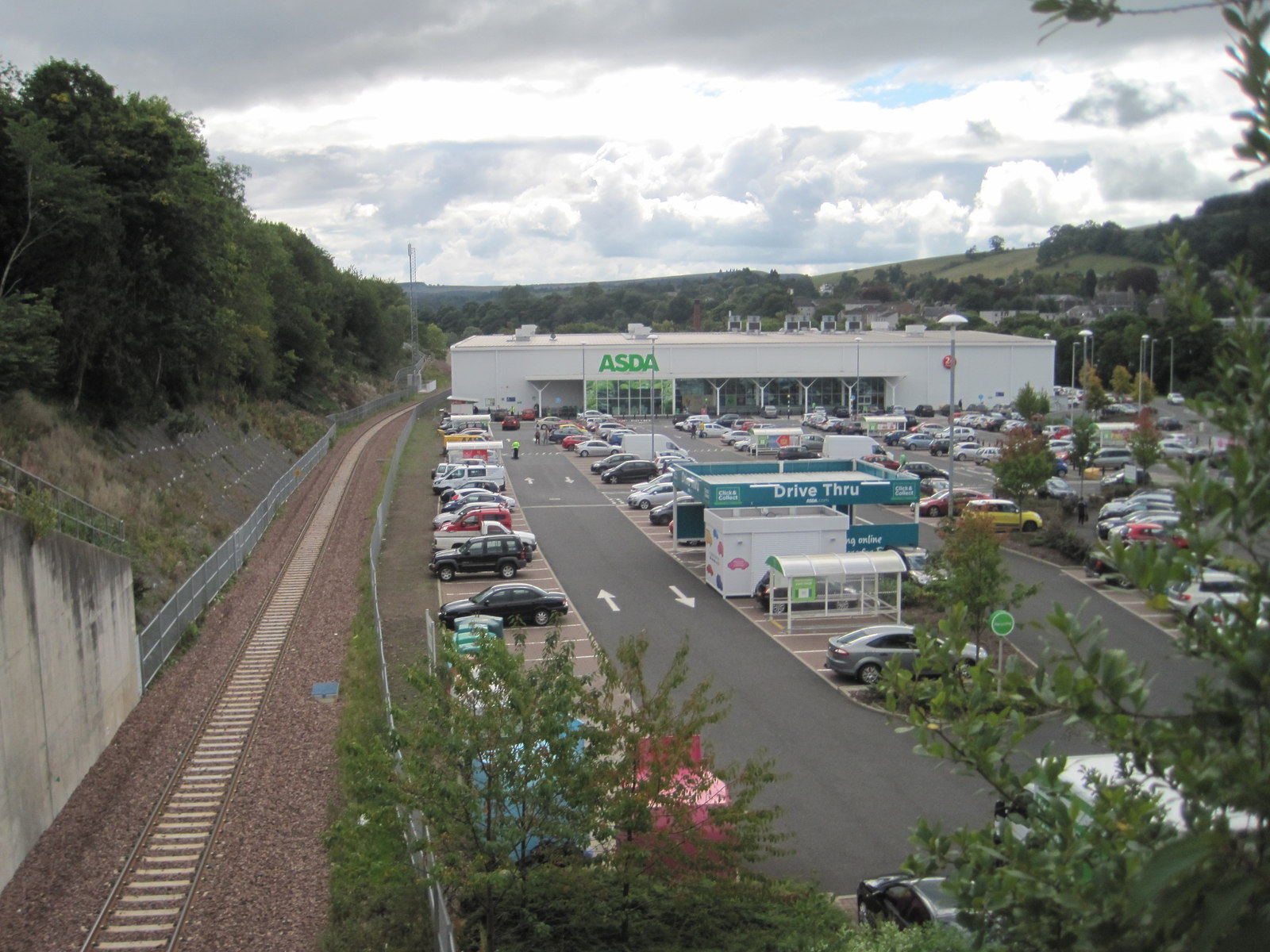
The site of the former station, closed in 1969

The station was opened on 20 February 1849 by the Edinburgh and Hawick Railway, which later became known as the Waverley Route. The line was nicknamed after the popular Waverley Novels, written by Sir Walter Scott. Upon completion on 1 July 1862, the line ran from Carlisle to Edinburgh Waverley via Hawick, covering a distance of 98 1/4 miles (158.1 km).

The station was the interchange point for the Selkirk and Galashiels Railway, which opened on 5 April 1856. Due to poor usage, passenger services were withdrawn without objection from 10 September 1951. The full line was closed, including to goods traffic, in 1966.

The station, along with the line Waverley Route, was closed by British Rail on 5 January 1969.

Following the opening of the Borders Railway on 6 September 2015, the line was extended 30 miles 60 chains (49.5 km) south-east from Newcraighall to Tweedbank. The current station is located slightly to the north of the original.

== Facilities ==
Galashiels Transport Interchange visible from the station

The station is equipped with a ticket machine, live departure screens, a waiting shelter and cycle spaces. Galashiels transport interchange, opened in August 2015, is located opposite the station. It provides interchange between several routes operated by Borders Buses, with destinations including Edinburgh, Carlisle, Berwick-upon-Tweed, Jedburgh, Langlee and Selkirk.

== Passenger volume ==
Passenger Volume at Galashiels
| | 2015–16 | 2016–17 | 2017–18 | 2018–19 | 2019–20 | 2020–21 | 2021–22 | 2022–23 |
|---|---|---|---|---|---|---|---|---|
| Entries and exits | 213,760 | 346,264 | 356,262 | 360,416 | 328,448 | 37,486 | 186,858 | 268,720 |

The statistics cover twelve month periods that start in April.

== Services ==
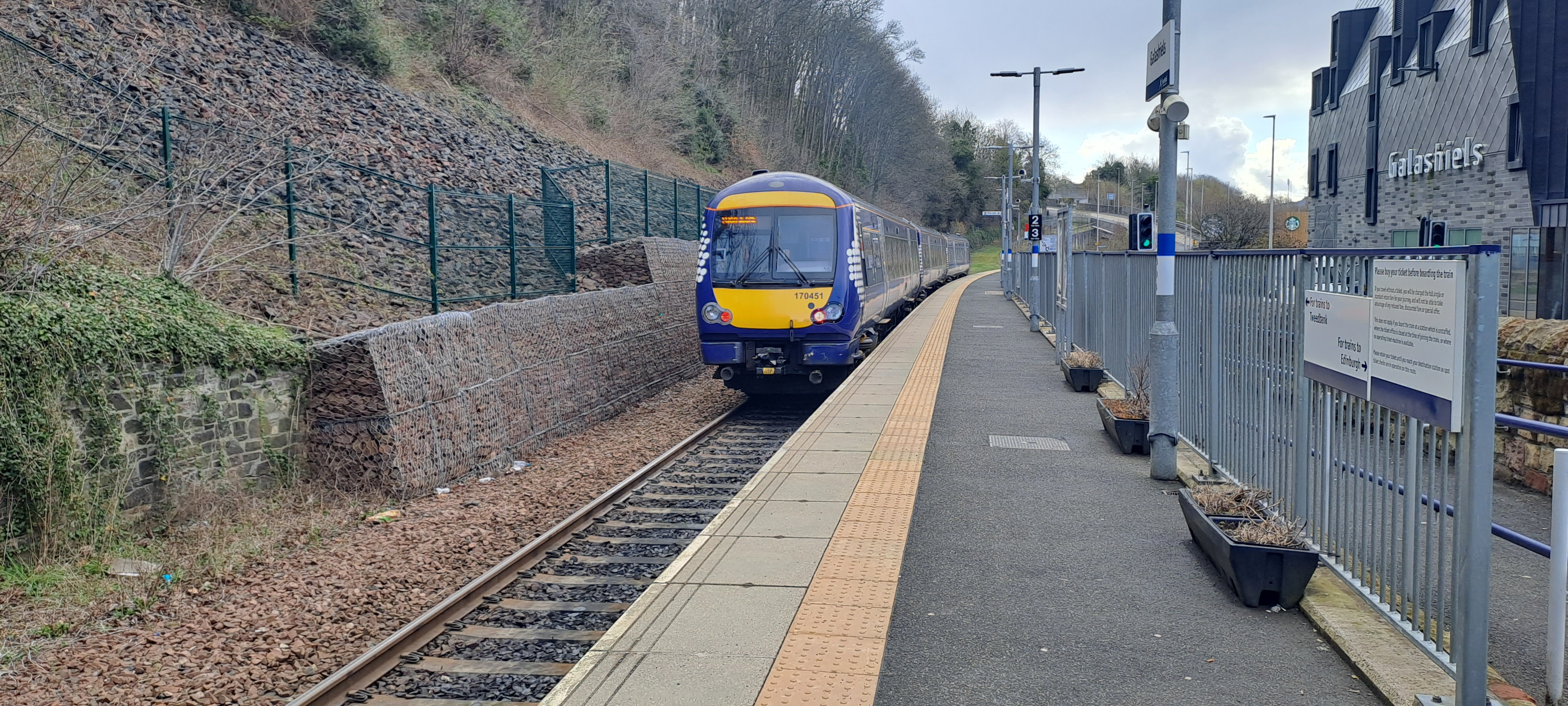
A Class 170 at the station

As of the May 2021 timetable change, the station is served by an hourly service between Edinburgh Waverley and Tweedbank, with a half-hourly service operating at peak times (Monday to Saturday). Some peak time trains continue to Glenrothes with Thornton. All services are operated by ScotRail.

As of May 2026, services no longer run beyond Edinburgh Waverley. The 2tph service in the peak now runs all day, except Sundays, where the service remains hourly. In the peak hours some services use a pair of Class 170 trains, thus being a 6-car service, although most services are a single class 170. A small number of services are ran by ScotRail's Class 158 2-car units.

| Preceding station | National Rail | Following station |
|---|---|---|
| Stow | ScotRail; Borders Railway | Tweedbank |
| | Historical railways | |
| Bowland | North British Railway; Waverley Route | Melrose |
| | Disused railways | |
| Clovenfords | North British Railway; Peebles Railway | Terminus |
| Terminus | North British Railway; Selkirk and Galashiels Railway | Abbotsford Ferry |

== Bibliography ==
- Caplan, Neil (1985). The Waverley Route. Railway World Special. Weybridge: Ian Allan. ISBN 0-7110-1541-4.
- Quick, Michael (2022) [2001]. Railway passenger stations in Great Britain: a chronology (PDF). version 5.04. Railway & Canal Historical Society. Archived from the original (PDF) on 25 November 2022.
- Thomas, John (1969). The North British Railway. Vol. 1. Newton Abbot: David & Charles. ISBN 0-7153-4697-0.
- Thomas, John (1981) [1976]. Scotland. Forgotten Railways. Newton Abbot: David & Charles. ISBN 0-7153-8193-8.
