= Borders Railway =

Railway from Edinburgh to Tweedbank

Coordinates: 55.78°N 2.95°W

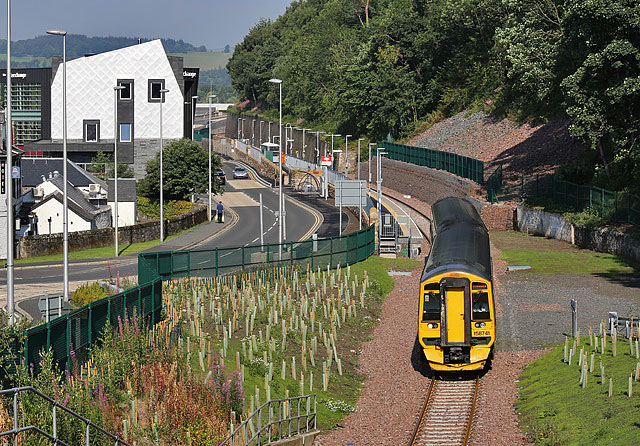
- Class 158 at Galashiels, August 2015

Overview
- Owner: Network Rail
- Locale: Edinburgh; Midlothian; Scottish Borders
- Termini: Edinburgh Waverley; Tweedbank
- Stations: 9
- Website: bordersrailway.co.uk

Service
- Type: Heavy rail
- System: National Rail
- Operator: ScotRail
- Depot(s): Tweedbank, Edinburgh Craigentinny
- Rolling stock: Class 158; Class 170
- Ridership: 2,016,186 (2019)

History
- Opened: 6 September 2015

Technical
- Line length: 35 miles 25 chains (56.8 km)
- Number of tracks: Single track (three passing loops)
- Track gauge: 4 ft 8 1/2 in (1,435 mm) standard gauge
- Electrification: OHLE Waverley to Newcraighall, unelectrified Newcraighall to Tweedbank
- Operating speed: 90 mph (145 km/h) max.
- Highest elevation: 880 ft (270 m)
Route map
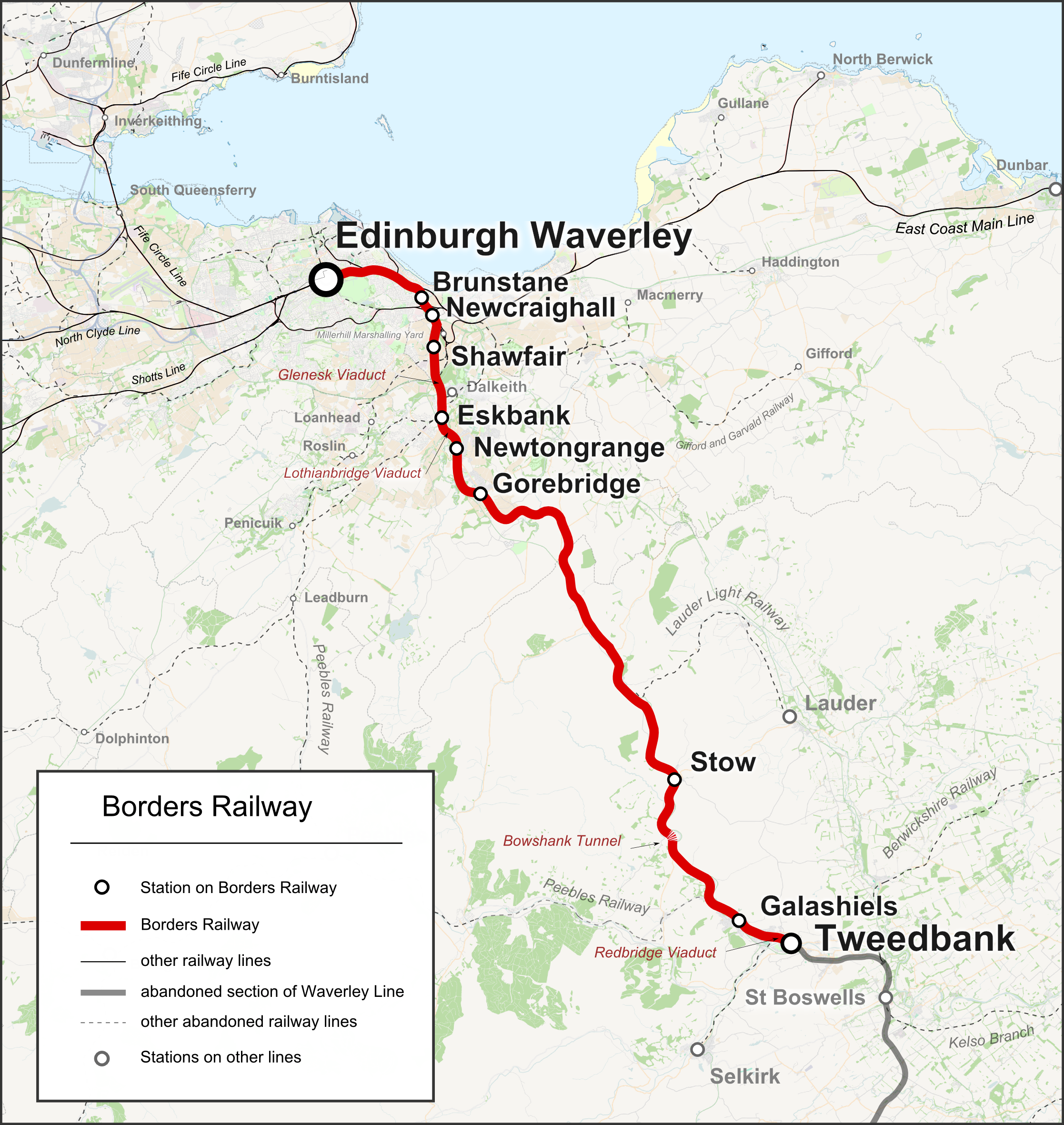

The Borders Railway connects the city of Edinburgh with Galashiels and Tweedbank in the Scottish Borders. The railway follows most of the alignment of the northern part of the Waverley Route, a former double-track line in southern Scotland and northern England that ran between Edinburgh and Carlisle. That line was controversially closed in 1969, as part of the Beeching cuts, leaving the Borders region without any access to the National Rail network. Following the closure, a campaign to revive the Waverley Route emerged. Discussion on reopening the northern part of the line came to a head during the early 2000s. Following deliberations in the Scottish Parliament, the Waverley Railway (Scotland) Act 2006 received royal assent in June 2006. The project was renamed the "Borders Railway" in August 2008, and building works began in November 2012. Passenger service on the line began on 6 September 2015, whilst an official opening by Queen Elizabeth II took place on 9 September.

The railway was rebuilt as a non-electrified, largely single-track line. Several surviving Waverley Route structures, including viaducts and tunnels, were rehabilitated and reused for the reopened railway. Passenger services run half-hourly on weekdays until 20:00, and hourly until 23:54 and on Sundays. The timetable also allows charter train promoters to run special excursion services, and for the weeks following the line opening scheduled steam trains were run.

== Background ==
=== Closure of the Waverley Route ===
In 1849, the North British Railway opened a line from Edinburgh through Midlothian as far as Hawick in the Scottish Borders; a further extension in 1862 brought the line to Carlisle in England. The line, known as the Waverley Route after the novels of the same name by Sir Walter Scott whose stories were set in the surrounding countryside, was controversially closed in January 1969 following the recommendation for its closure in the 1963 Beeching Report as an unremunerative line. According to information released by the Ministry of Transport, the potential savings to British Railways from the line's closure were at least £536,000. In addition, an estimated grant of £700,000 would have been required to maintain a full service on the line. The last passenger train over the Waverley Route was the Edinburgh-St Pancras sleeper on 5 January 1969 worked by Class 45 D60 Lytham St Anne's which arrived two hours late into Carlisle due to anti-closure protesters blocking the line.

=== Campaign to revive Borders rail ===
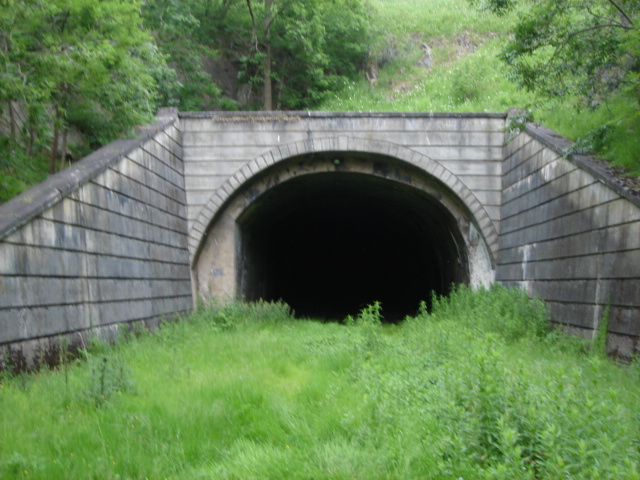
Bowshank Tunnel before the Borders Railway project, 2006

In 1992, Borders architect Simon Longland conducted a motorbike survey of the route which led him to set up the company Borders Transport Futures (BTF) to evaluate the possibility of reopening. Having carried out feasibility work, in 1997 the company came close to lodging Parliamentary plans for what would effectively be a long siding for timber traffic from the West Coast Main Line at Gretna to Longtown and Riccarton Junction where the line would branch off along the former Border Counties Railway to Kielder Forest. This scheme, known as the South Borders Railway, was one of two projects promoted by BTF, the other being the North Borders Railway – a commuter line from Edinburgh to Galashiels. There were no plans to link the two lines. The South Borders Railway ran into difficulties as a result of the unwillingness of landowners to sell land.

Based on the BTF's groundwork, the Campaign for Borders Rail, founded in 1999, was able to advance a project to reopen a section between Galashiels and Tweedbank to passengers. The first moves came in 1999 when the Scottish Parliament supported a motion by Christine Grahame MSP which called for the reinstatement of the line as a means of reversing the economic decline of the Borders region. This was followed by a £400,000 feasibility study conducted by Scott Wilson and commissioned by the Scottish Office which reported in February 2000 that there were "no insurmountable planning or environmental constraints" to reinstatement as much of the original line could be reused, although several major obstacles would need to be overcome which would entail substantial costs.

A number of blockages were identified in the 12-mile (19 km) section between Edinburgh and Gorebridge. The first was the breach of the former line by the Edinburgh City Bypass which intersected the trackbed at a shallow angle resulting in more than 220 yards (200 m) of the alignment being buried. When the bypass was designed, local councils had requested that provision be made for the railway but they were overruled by the Department of Transport which insisted that the trackbed should be cut "on the level". Two further breaches were reported as a result of improvements to the A7 road between Eskbank and Gorebridge. A small housing estate had been built on the line in Gorebridge. Even more encroachments were found on the line south of Tweedbank which would take infrastructure costs over £100 million. The Scott Wilson report also indicated that patronage projections for a new line were not encouraging, with none of the route options examined producing a positive cost-benefit value. The option which came closest to a neutral cost-benefit assessment was a reopening only as far as Gorebridge. Nevertheless, Scott Wilson did indicate that the reopening of the line would benefit the Borders region by providing better links with Edinburgh and creating up to 900 new jobs. Scott Wilson also suggested that part of the Border Counties Railway as far as Kielder Forest could be reinstated at a cost of £26 million to allow timber traffic to be carried on the southern part of the new Borders line. Furthermore, line speeds of 70–90 mph could be achieved on a single line, resulting in a journey time from the Borders to Edinburgh of 45 minutes compared to 55 minutes by car.

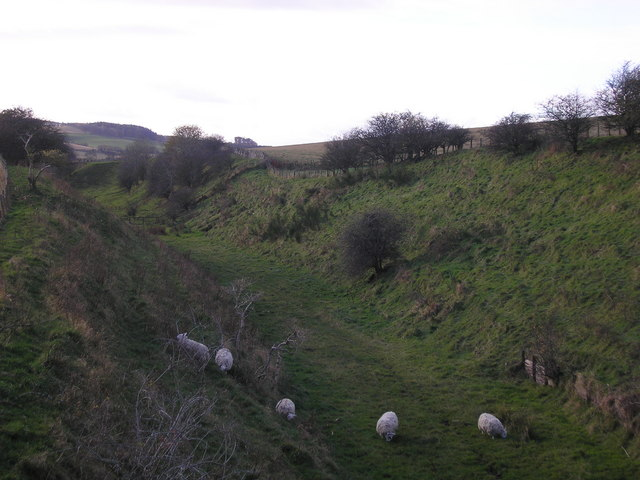
Waverley Route right-of-way near Gorebridge prior to the Borders Railway project, 2007

Despite the recommendations in the Scott Wilson report, political pressure on the Scottish Government to reconnect the Borders region eventually resulted in it giving support to the extension of the Edinburgh commuter network by 30 miles (48 km) as far as the Galashiels area.

Pressure came in particular from the Campaign for Borders Rail on behalf of which Petra Biberbach in February 2000 presented a petition with 17,261 signatures to the Public Petitions Committee of the Scottish Parliament. The petition received the unanimous support of the Parliament's Rural Affairs Committee which submitted it to the Parliamentary Chamber for debate. At its debate on 1 June, the Parliament passed unopposed motion SIM-922 according to which it "recognises and endorses the case for establishment of a railway linking the Scottish Borders to the national network at Edinburgh and Carlisle and urges the Scottish Executive to consult with the Strategic Rail Authority and others to facilitate its establishment". The Scottish Borders Council, Midlothian Council, City of Edinburgh Council, Scottish Enterprise Borders, Borders Transport Futures, Railtrack and ScotRail bid for £1.9 million from the Scottish Executive's Public Transport Fund to allow a Parliamentary Order for reopening as far as Tweedbank to be taken forward. Once funding had been obtained, the three local authorities created the Waverley Railway Joint Committee to promote the scheme; consultant Turner & Townsend was appointed to carry out the necessary studies for a Transport and Works Act application.

=== Edinburgh Crossrail ===
While the proposed Borders Railway was undergoing a lengthy period of consultation, passenger services were reintroduced on the surviving freight-only section of the Waverley Route between Portobello Junction and Millerhill. Brunstane and Newcraighall stations opened on 3 June 2002, the latter being 4 3/4 miles (7.6 km) from Edinburgh, providing a park-and-ride service to the city. The scheme cost £10 million to build two basic stations and upgrade 1.1 miles (1.8 km) of track for frequent passenger services. According to ScotRail, it was the first "proper heavy rail reopening" with stations since privatisation and the first permanent service to stations in the east of Edinburgh since Abbeyhill, Piershill, Portobello and Joppa closed in September 1964. Plans for a station at Portobello were abandoned amid concerns that trains using it would hold up GNER services.

A half-hourly service was launched using Class 158s running alternately to Dunblane and Bathgate. This service, termed Edinburgh Crossrail, extended from Newcraighall through to Edinburgh Waverley, and continued either onto the North Clyde Line or the Fife Circle Line. The service from Newcraighall through to the North Clyde Line was later electrified as a byproduct of the Airdrie-Bathgate Rail Link, leaving that from Newcraighall to Dalmeny and through to the Fife Circle Line with diesel trains. Crossrail was a success, and provided forward momentum for the Borders Railway project.

=== Business case ===
The full business case for the line was published in mid-2004, showing a modest benefit to cost ratio of 1.01 to 1. The case was in some part built on projected housing developments – 700 in the Borders and 1,100 in Midlothian – that led to an anti-rail backlash in local elections with the success of the Borders Party. Representing the party, Councillor Nicholas Watson described the scheme as "a colossal waste of money" and called for the funds to be used instead on the Glasgow Airport Rail Link. The Campaign for Borders Rail indicated that the low ratio followed from the choice to build a single-track line for half-hourly commuter services with no capacity for freight or specials. A revised benefit-cost ratio of 1.32 was announced in March 2008 despite costs of construction having risen to between £235 million and £295 million.

In February 2013, the final business case was released by the Scottish Government, which showed a benefit-cost ratio of just 0.5:1. This led the journal Local Transport Today to comment that the line was "one of the worst-performing major transport projects to be funded in recent times." The Campaign for Borders Rail responded stating that the ratio was based on modelling that underestimated the route's potential patronage, predicting only 23,431 yearly return trips from Galashiels equivalent to only 70 passengers a day or three per train, which would be less than the number using the existing bus service.

=== Parliamentary approval ===
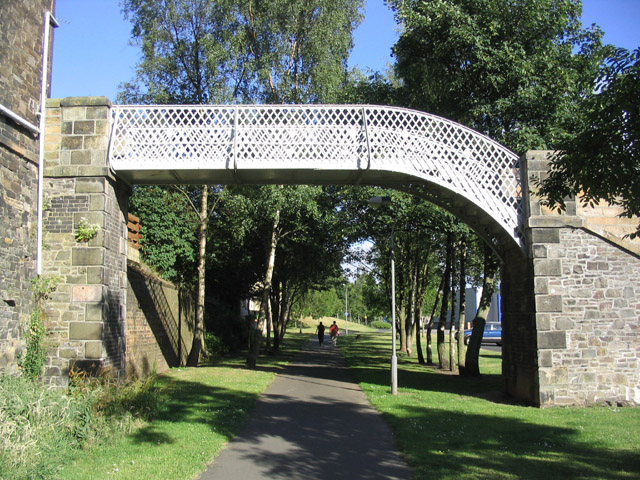
Footbridge over the former Waverley Route right-of-way in Galashiels. Track has since been relaid under the bridge.

In July 2005, the Waverley Railway Bill Committee came out in support of reopening as far as Galashiels. The bill was debated in September 2005 and a motion supporting it was passed with 102 in favour, none against and one abstention. On 9 May 2006, the bill committee published its final report supporting the project with two recommendations: a station had to be provided at Stow and the line had to be completed to its full extent, i.e. as far as Tweedbank. These recommendations were accepted by the Scottish Parliament in the final debate on the bill on 14 June 2006. The bill was carried by 114 votes to one. The Waverley Railway (Scotland) Act 2006 received royal assent on 24 June 2006 and sanctioned the construction of around 30 miles (48 km) of new railway as far as Tweedbank with seven new stations. In total, the act had taken three full parliamentary years to be passed, with 29 committee meetings, 108 witnesses and a quantity of paper 4 feet (1.2 m) in height.

The line is the longest stretch of railway to be reopened in modern British history, 2 miles (3.2 km) longer than the Robin Hood Line project, as well as the longest line in Scotland since the opening of the West Highland Line in 1901. On 6 August 2008, the Waverley Railway project was renamed the Borders Railway project and put under the control of Transport Scotland as statutory undertaker.

=== Building works ===
==== Tendering process ====
In October 2009, the launch of a call for tenders stalled following discussions between the Scottish Government and HM Treasury over new regulations that required public–private partnerships to be recorded as public expenditure. A project timetable was announced by Finance Secretary John Swinney on 4 November 2009, whereby he stated that construction of the line would not begin prior to the 2011 elections to the Scottish Parliament. The tendering process finally began on 16 December 2009, when a contract notice was published in the Official Journal of the European Union.

Transport Scotland announced in June 2010 that three consortiums that had submitted expressions of interest in the project were to be invited to participate in a competitive dialogue; these were BAM UK, IMCD (Sir Robert McAlpine, Iridium Concesiones de Infraestructuras and Carillion) and New Borders Railway (Fluor, Miller and Uberior Infrastructure Investments). In mid-November 2010, the withdrawal of Fluor resulted in the third consortium pulling out of the bidding process. The second consortium withdrew in June 2011 following the decision by Carillion not to continue. This led to the cancellation of the tender procedure by Scottish transport minister Keith Brown. Network Rail was chosen by Transport Scotland to undertake the project and, following months of negotiations, a Transfer of Responsibility was signed at a ceremony held on 6 November 2012 at the Scottish Mining Museum in Newtongrange. Network Rail agreed to build the line by mid-2015 for £294 million, an increase on the estimated £230 million that the line was expected to cost and the £100 million that it was originally costed at in 2000. This figure is also substantially more than the £189 million which Network Rail Chief Executive Iain Coucher agreed to build the line in late 2007 or early 2008.

In December 2012, Network Rail appointed BAM Nuttall as its main contractor. The Network Rail team which worked on the line was essentially the same as the one which delivered the Airdrie-Bathgate Rail Link in 2009. A Network Rail spokesman confirmed that lessons learned from the previous project had been applied to the Borders project, such as better coordination between the different teams by having them together in one office in Newtongrange. In June 2013, the design contract for the line was awarded to URS which agreed to design new bridges, stations and roads, as well as the refurbishment of existing bridges and the provision of engineering support, for £3.5 million.

==== Project specifications ====
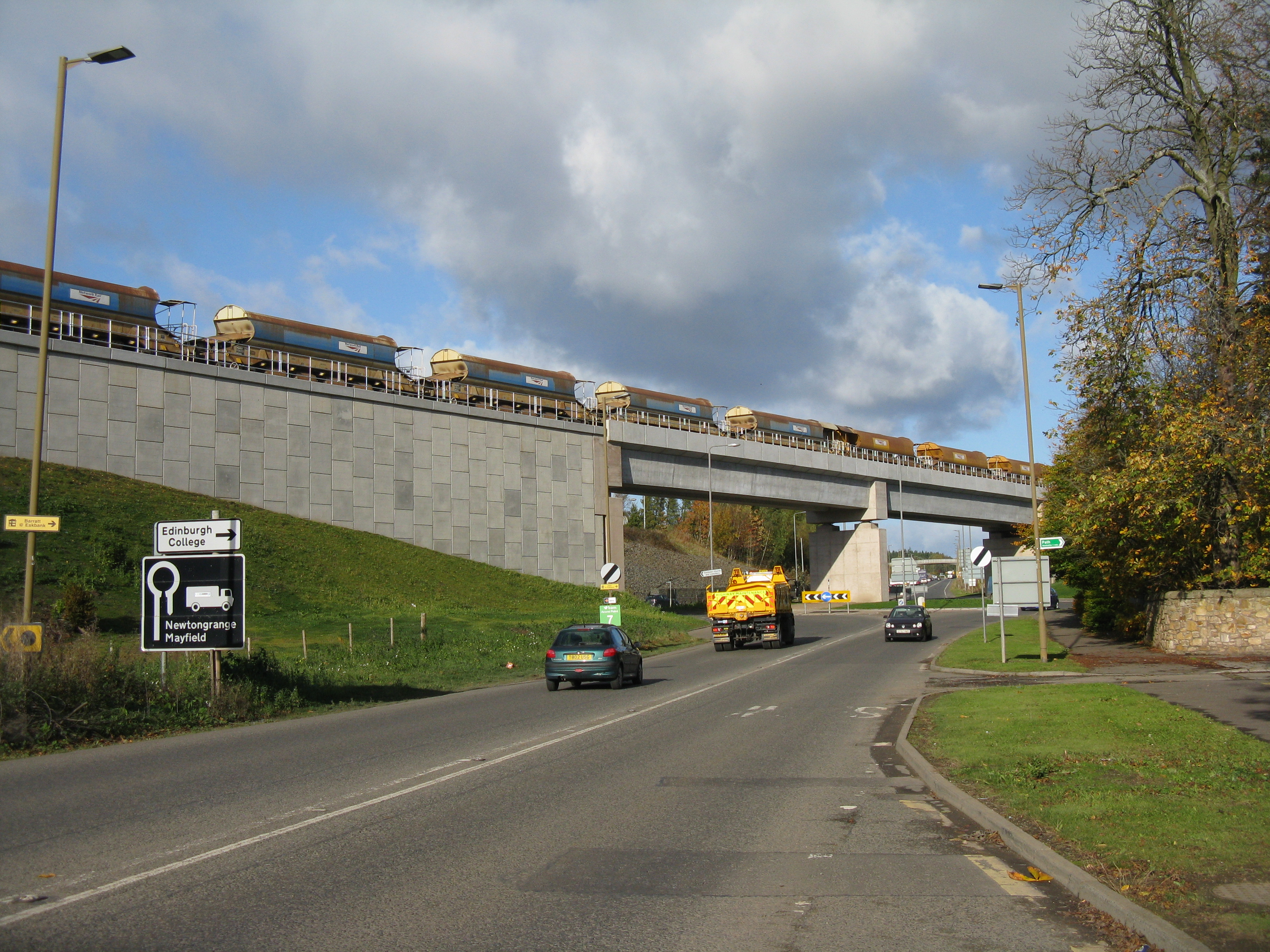
Newly-built viaduct over Hardengreen roundabout, October 2014

The line comprises 40 miles (65 km) of single-line track over a distance of 31 miles (50 km), plus 42 new bridges, 95 refurbished bridges and two refurbished tunnels, and required 1.5 million tonnes of earth to be moved. Stations are provided at Shawfair, Eskbank, Newtongrange, Gorebridge, Stow, Galashiels, and Tweedbank. According to Network Rail, the line was not suitable for double track and, in any event, there was no business case for doubling the line from the outset. As a result, 21 1/4 miles (34.2 km) of the line are single-track with three "dynamic" passing loops providing 9 1/2 miles (15.3 km) of double-track to allow for half-hourly services. The route is not electrified but provision has been made to install overhead line if required as bridges have been built to W12 gauge. Although certain sections of the line are designed for speeds of up to 90 miles per hour (140 km/h), average speeds over the whole line are in the region of 35–39 miles per hour (56–63 km/h).

Amongst the line's 27 substantial structures, the greatest engineering challenge was posed by the point where the track met the Edinburgh City Bypass. At that point, a tunnel had to be constructed under the A720 road while it had been temporarily diverted; in total, the project incorporated five new associated road schemes. Major challenges were also posed by abandoned mine shafts to the north of the route, some of which dated to the 16th century and had not been mapped. More than 200 bridges were involved in the scheme, as the route crosses the Gala Water and River Tweed nineteen times. One of the most vital bridges on the line carries the track over Hardengreen roundabout on the A7, and required extensive works throughout 2013. Other works included digging out an infilled cutting on the outskirts of Galashiels and reconstructing a nearby bridge to allow the line to pass under power lines.

==== Works commence ====
The first sod was turned at Galashiels on 3 March 2010, when Scottish transport minister Stewart Stevenson attended a ceremony in the presence of campaigner Madge Elliot. This triggered a clause in the 2006 Waverley Railway Act, which committed the Scottish Government to complete the line to Tweedbank once works had been commenced.

Construction began in earnest on 18 April 2013 after completion of remedial and preparatory works such as land acquisition, removal of vegetation, demolition of certain structures and remedial works on old mines in Midlothian, for which over £54 million was spent by Network Rail. The first task was the excavation of the track alignment through Monktonhall and the clearing of the site for Shawfair station. Construction of the line's first bridge, Rye Haugh Bridge at Millerhall, were underway on 6 August 2013 as part of works to deviate the line out of Edinburgh from Newcraighall before it returns to the original alignment. The 23-arch Newbattle Viaduct (or Lothianbridge Viaduct) was used by lorries removing spoil from the construction site which eased traffic on local roads.

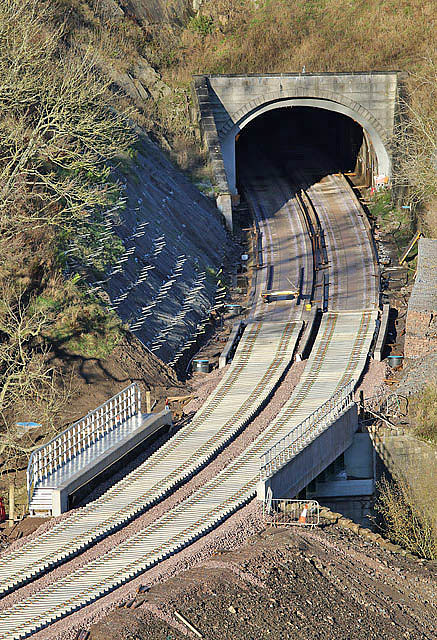
Preparations for track-laying at Bowshank Tunnel, November 2014

The first track was laid in the Bowshank Tunnel on 4 April 2014. On 30 September 2014, the first train on the Waverley Route for 45 years – a works train – ran to Newcraighall. Tracklaying began in earnest on 6 October 2014, although preliminary works had resulted in a section of slab track laid through Bowshank Tunnel, south of Stow, as well as ballasting along large sections of the route and pre-cast switch and crossing units for the passing loops. The first part of the route to be ballasted was the section through Lothianbridge Viaduct to which structural repairs had to be carried out. By the end of October, more than 11 miles (18 km) of track had been laid as far as Tynehead and the double-track on the Shawfair loop had been completed plus 2 miles (3.2 km) of the second track on the Borthwick loop. Work was halted in late November 2014 after a contractor working for BAM Nuttall in the Gala area was injured when a sleeper came loose when being lifted into position and landed on his leg. Work restarted on 12 January 2015 following a review by BAM of their track installation methodology. By 3 February, the track was complete through Galashiels and hundreds of spectators turned out to welcome the first train into the station since 1969, which was hauled by GBRf Class 66761 and 66741.

==== Completion ====
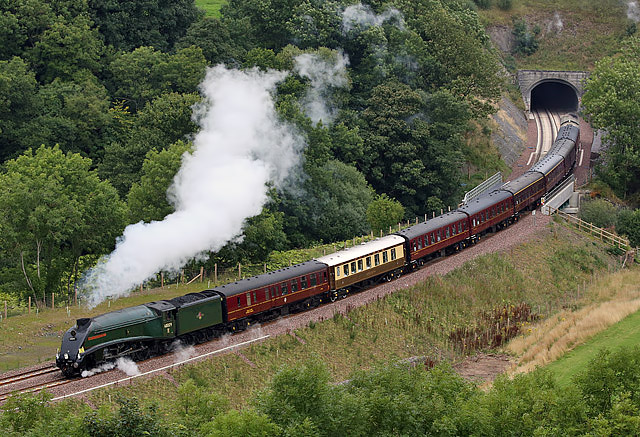
Queen Elizabeth II was carried to Tweedbank aboard a train hauled by no. 60009 Union of South Africa on 9 September 2015, shown here south of Bowshank Tunnel.

On 5 February 2015, Network Rail's tracklaying machine reached the end of the line at Tweedbank station where a large crowd had gathered. As there was not enough track for the train to complete tracklaying into the second platform, it had to return the next day. The formal completion took place on 12 February when Keith Brown clipped the final length of rail into place. During the period of construction, more than 1,000 rails were laid across 100,000 sleepers. With the infrastructure complete, attention was turned to the installation of signalling and communications equipment as well as finalising the stations. A GSM-R system controlled from the IECC next to Edinburgh Waverley was in place by April 2015.

On 13 May 2015, the first test train, DRS Class 37 604 with DBSO 9702, worked the 1Q13 Tweedbank-Millerhill. On 4 June 2015, a ceremony was held at Edinburgh Waverley to mark the final stages of the completion of works during which Madge Elliot, a veteran campaigner and founder member of the Campaign for Borders Rail, had Class 66 528 renamed in her honour. Official completion and handover of the line to the ScotRail Alliance, a group formed by Network Rail and Abellio ScotRail, took place on 14 June 2015. A 12-week period of driver training for 64 drivers and 64 guards began on 7 June 2015, with Abellio ScotRail Class 170 170414 in livery promoting the new line undertaking a proving run to measure stepping distances from platforms to trains. The train, which carried a large number of Network Rail staff, stopped at all stations from Newcraighall to Tweedbank in the presence of large crowds of spectators. The following day Class 158 158741 was used for the first driver-training runs. On 26 July 2015, a driver-training train carried Borders rail campaigner Madge Elliot. The Borders Railway was named the Scottish infrastructure project of 2016 by the Royal Institution of Chartered Surveyors. The final cost of the project was £353 million, of which £295 million was construction costs (in 2012 prices).

==== Opening ====
Regular passenger services began on 6 September 2015 when the 08:45 Tweedbank - Edinburgh Waverley departed formed of two-car ScotRail Class 158s led by 158701. On the first day more than 2,500 journeys were made. A special VIP press trip had run on 4 September which left Edinburgh Waverley at 10:20 for Tweedbank.

The railway was officially opened by Queen Elizabeth II on 9 September 2015 - the day on which she became the longest-reigning monarch in British history. Her Majesty travelled with the Duke of Edinburgh and First Minister Nicola Sturgeon on LNER Class A4 4488 Union of South Africa where they were met with children singing the National Anthem. The locomotive hauled a rake of Mark 1s provided by the SRPS as well as Pullman car No. 310 Pegasus. Due to bad weather, the Queen's helicopter journey from Balmoral was delayed which resulted in the late departure of the train and a delay at Newcraighall while a ScotRail service cleared the single-line section to the south. Her Majesty alighted at Newtongrange to unveil a plaque marking the opening of the railway; a second plaque was unveiled at Tweedbank. The following day the LNER Class A4 commenced a six-week programme of Borders steam specials promoted by ScotRail which saw services run to Tweedbank for three days each week. Around 6,200 passengers were carried on the 17 fully booked services.

During its first month of operations, 125,971 passengers travelled on the Borders Railway. Demand was far in excess of what ScotRail had expected, with the line carrying 19.4% of its predicted annual patronage of 650,000 in one month. The unexpected level of patronage resulted in overcrowding on services and passengers unable to board at intermediate stations, leading ScotRail to run four or six carriages with morning and peak trains. ScotRail also leased additional parking space near Tweedbank station as the 235-space car park provided was generally full before 9am. The National Mining Museum near Newtongrange station reported a hike in visitor numbers, while the nearby towns of Melrose and St Boswells confirmed a rise in business and tourism.

== Route details ==
=== Line characteristics ===
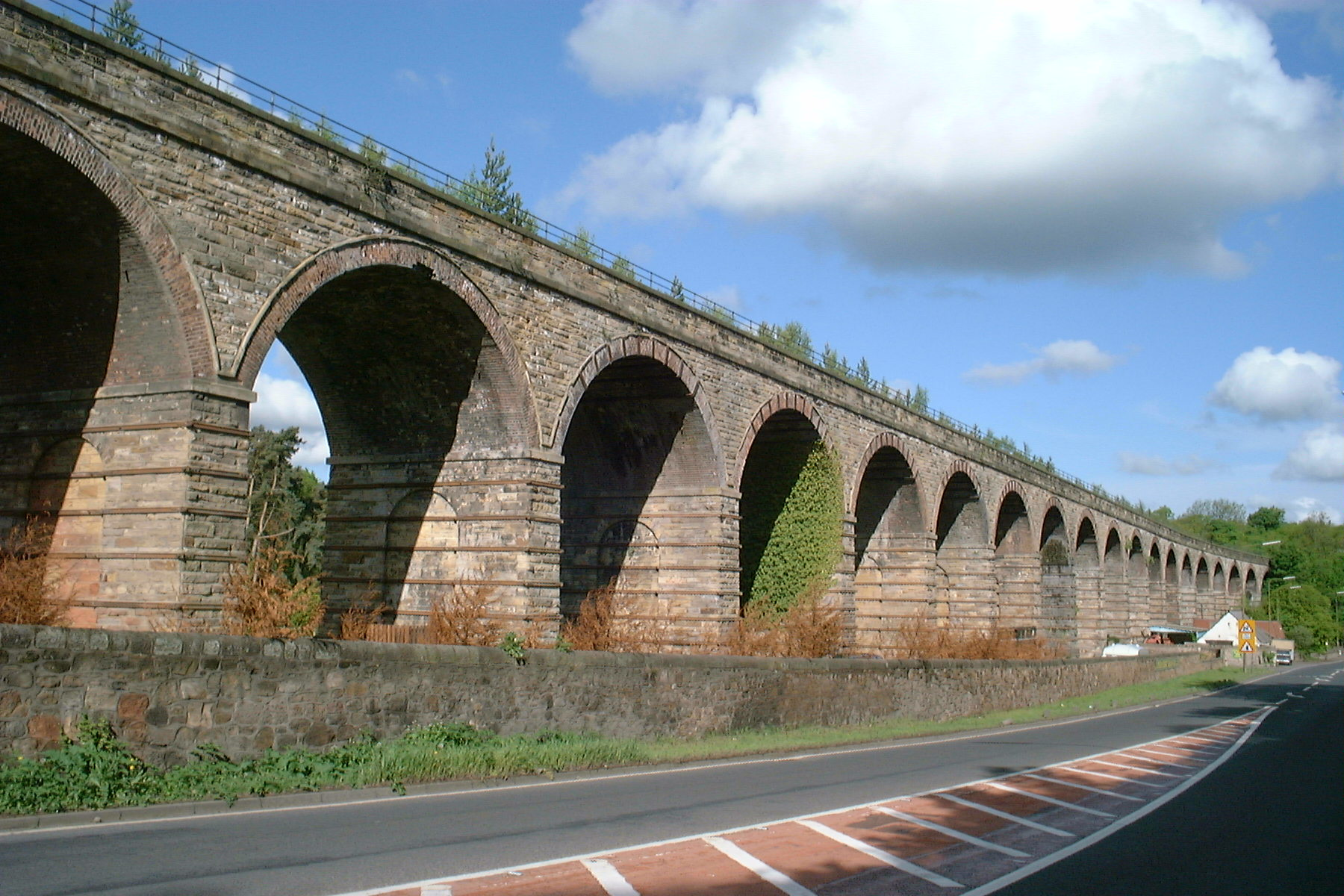
Newbattle Viaduct prior to refurbishment, May 2000

The line begins at Newcraighall South Junction where the track veers off the former Waverley Route to a parallel alignment just to the west which crosses over the former Monktonhall Colliery, part of the Midlothian Coalfield. The first of three double-track dynamic loops begins here and continues for 2.1 mi (3.4 km) to King's Gate Junction just beyond the Edinburgh Bypass. The new alignment - some 660 yards (600 m) to the south-west of the original route - avoids new roads and mining subsidence on the Waverley Route trackbed through Millerhill, whilst also serving new housing at Shawfair. There is a maximum speed limit on the Shawfair loop of 60 miles per hour (97 km/h), with restrictions of 40 mph (64 km/h) at the northern entrance to the loop and 55 mph (89 km/h) at King's Gate. A new bridge carries the Edinburgh bypass across the double-track. The Waverley Route is rejoined at King's Gate where it becomes single-track for 5 1/2 miles (8.9 km) through Eskbank, Newtongrange and Gorebridge.

Immediately after Eskbank, Hardengreen viaduct, an 87-yard (80 m) concrete span bridge, carries the line over the A7 road at Hardenbridge, thereby correcting the damage caused by the Dalkeith Western Bypass. Thereafter Glenesk viaduct crosses the River North Esk, a single-arch span built for the Edinburgh and Dalkeith Railway between 1829 and 1831, which is one of Scotland's oldest railway bridges. This is soon followed by the 23-arch Newbattle Viaduct between Eskbank and Newtongrange, where the single-track runs down the centre of the structure as is the case for the Ribblehead Viaduct on the Settle-Carlisle Line. The second double-track section begins at Fushiebridge Junction and continues for 3.8 miles (6.1 km) to just beyond the site of Tynehead station. A 10-mile (16 km) single-track section then extends as far as Falahill where a 110-yard (100 m) reinforced concrete box takes the line under the A7, the original alignment having been lost to allow the road to be straightened across the trackbed. The realignment at Falahill as well as the installation of single-track on a wider double-track alignment has allowed higher line speeds to be reached here than was possible on the Waverley Route; whereas the curvature of old alignment limited the line speed to 60 mph (97 km/h), the new line has seen units reach 86 mph (138 km/h). The speed limit for the next 7 miles (11 km) to Galabank Junction is 85 mph (137 km/h) with a 60 mph (97 km/h) restriction at the halfway point. The limit is raised to 90 miles per hour (140 km/h) for 1 3/4 miles (2.8 km) south of Tynehead, although this speed is unlikely to be reached in practice due to the gradient and the short distance involved.

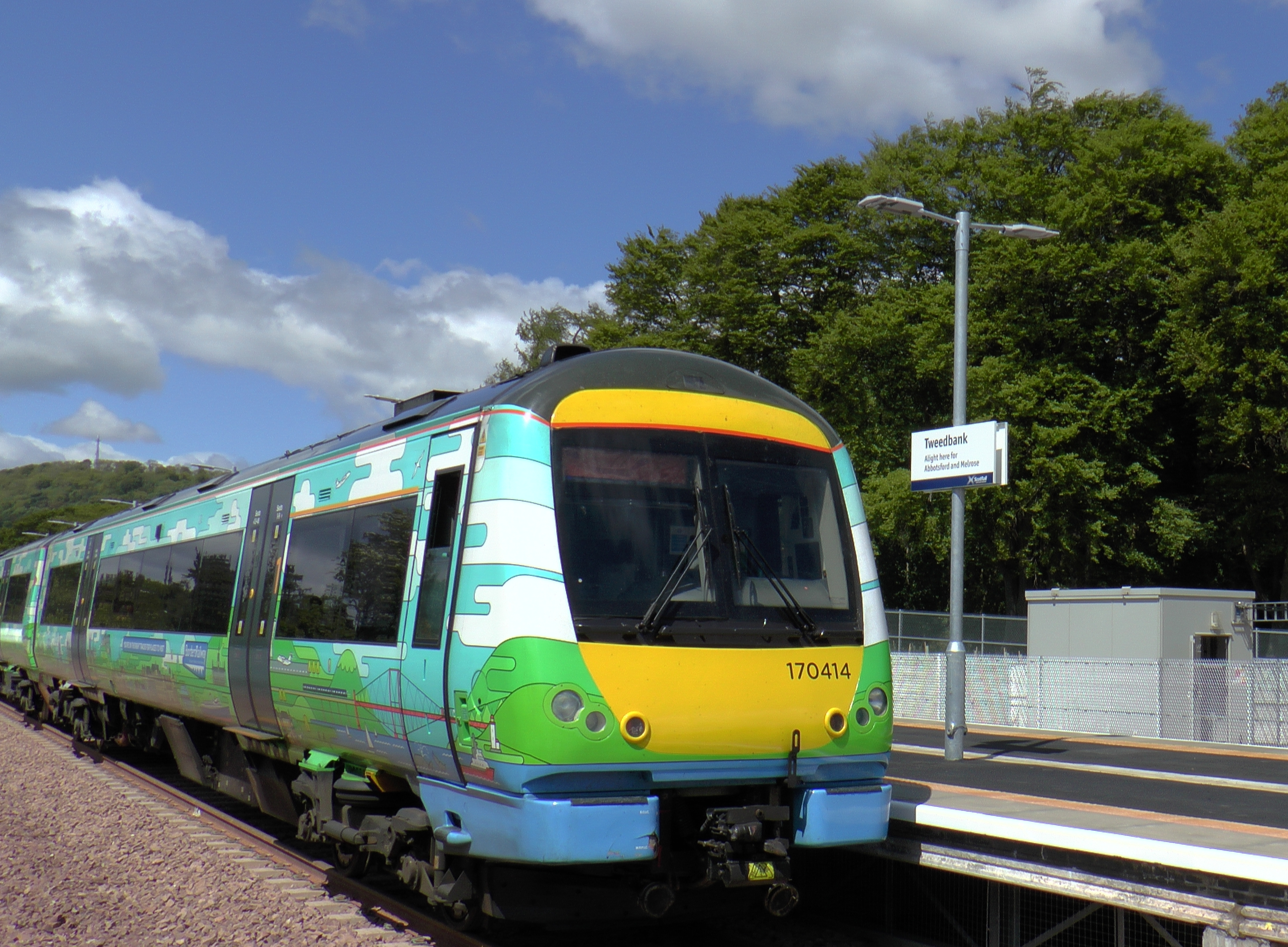
Class 170 at Tweedbank, June 2015

The final section of double-track begins at Galabank Junction on the approach to Stow where a 3 1/4 mi (5.2 km) loop is entered by a 60 miles per hour (97 km/h) turnout before proceeding through several reverse curves and the 220-yard (200 m) Bowshank Tunnel to reach Bowland Points. The speed limit drops from 70 mph (113 km/h) to 60 mph (97 km/h) through Bowland. The last 5 1/2-mile (9 km) stretch to Galashiels and Tweedbank is entirely single-track save for the approach to Tweedbank. The 69-yard (63 m) Torwoodlee Tunnel is traversed just before Galashiels and four river crossings are made in under 2 miles (3.2 km) which required new bridge spans. At Galashiels, due to trackbed encroachment, the line deviates eastwards between a steep bank and the side wall of a supermarket which occupies the former station site. For the final 2 miles (3.2 km) to Tweedbank, the line follows its original alignment over a reconstructed embankment and through an excavated cutting before crossing the River Tweed on the Category B listed Redbridge Viaduct.

In terms of gradients, the line proceeds on the level until Eskbank where it climbs to the summit at Falahill 268 m (880 ft) above sea level at a ruling gradient of 1 in 70 and then descends at a typical gradient of 1 in 150 into Galashiels and Tweedbank. Falahill is the tenth highest standard gauge railway summit in Britain, just 11 m (35 ft) lower than Shap summit. The Fushiebridge loop is on a 1 in 70 gradient and climbs southwards up the Borthwick Bank which had posed a challenge in the past for steam locomotives pulling heavy loads.

Potential for further doubling exists around Newtongrange where passive provision has been made. The line has seven sets of points, two for each of the three dynamic loops, and one at the Tweedbank terminus.

=== Places served ===
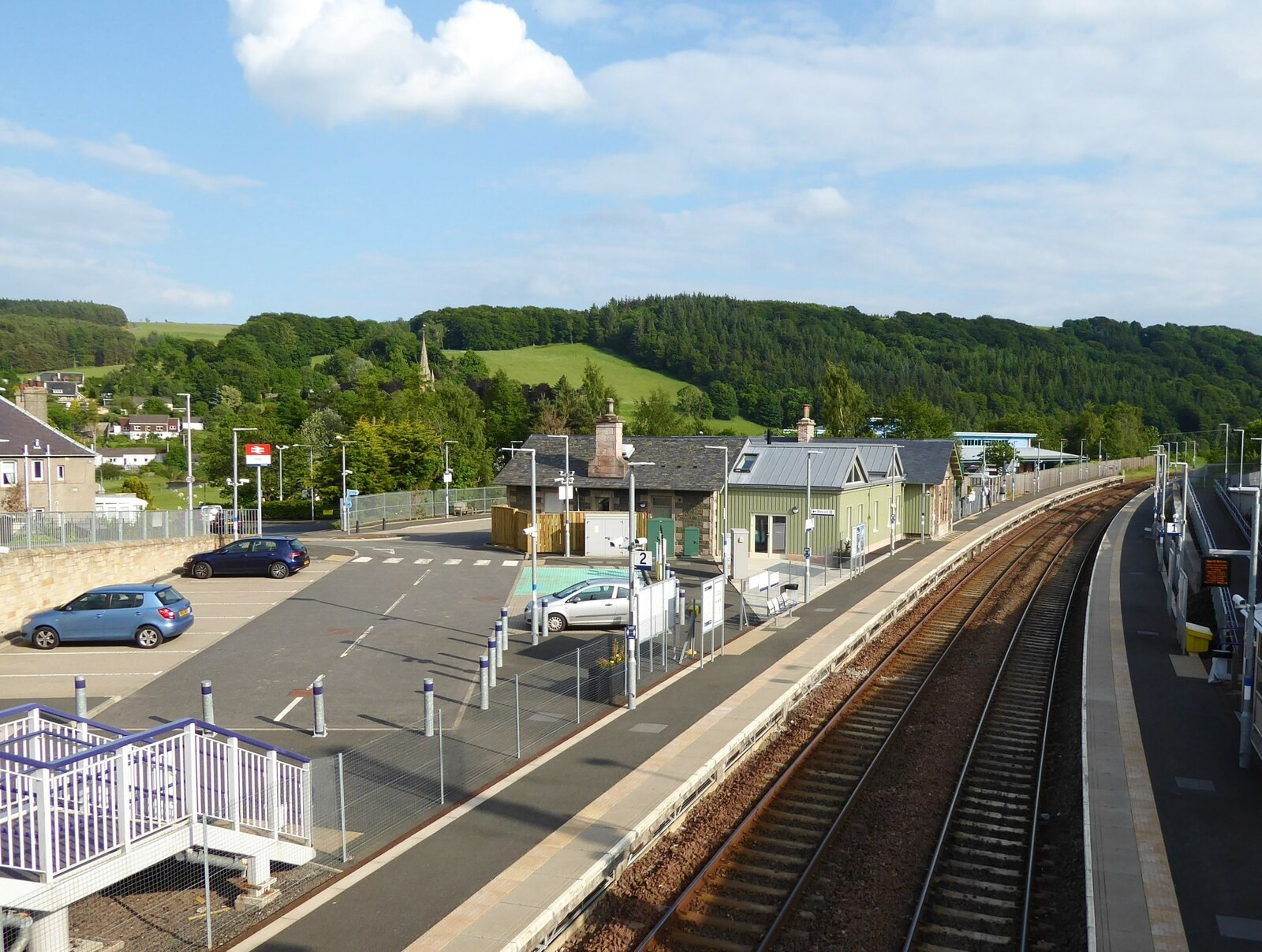
Stow railway station – the old station building has been retained

The 30-mile (48 km) long route serves Tweedbank, Galashiels, Stow, Gorebridge, Newtongrange, Eskbank, Shawfair, Newcraighall, Brunstane and Edinburgh Waverley stations, with a total running time of 55 minutes for most services. Certain services are slowed due to conflicts with other operators' services in the Edinburgh area. The new stations are not staffed, but ticket machines and train information have been provided. All stations other than Galashiels have park and ride facilities; at Galashiels, the local council built a £5.2 million bus/rail interchange. The station at Stow was a late addition to the scheme after lobbying by the Campaign for Borders Rail. Campaigning also resulted in the extension of platforms at the line's Tweedbank terminus to 312 yards (285 m), to accommodate tourist charter trains of up to 10–12 carriages in length. Passive provision has been made for the extension of all other station platforms from 170 yards (160 m) to 257 yards (235 m). Eskbank station is convenient for an Edinburgh College campus, as well as the Midlothian Community Hospital.

=== Naming of the line ===
The first recorded use of the term Borders Railway to describe the reopened line was in a paper by the Corus Rail Consultancy in January 2004, entitled Delivering an innovative Borders Railway, which had been commissioned by the Waverley Route Trust. Previously, the Edinburgh–Tweedbank line had been variously described as the Waverley Railway and the Borders Rail Link. In mid-2014, Transport Scotland considered launching a competition for the public to submit their ideas for a name but the Scottish Borders Council was strongly opposed on the basis that Borders Railway had developed a strong brand identity. The use of Waverley Line or Waverley Route for the line was considered historically inaccurate by the Council and the Campaign for Borders Rail since these names were only ever used for the whole of the original line as far as Carlisle.

=== Patronage ===
The Transport Scotland Business Case for Borders Railway, published in November 2012, central patronage forecast estimated that the additional passenger return journeys made for the first year of operation would be 647,136. This was broken down into Edinburgh Park (4,071), Haymarket (35,329), Edinburgh Waverley (220,533), Brunstane and Newcraighall combined (986), Shawfair (61,860), Eskbank (130,525), Newtongrange (52,918), Gorebridge (90,019), Stow (5,843), Galashiels (23,431) and Tweedbank (21,621).

After the first month, the actual number of passengers was 125,971, compared to the predicted annual total of around 650,000 additional return journeys, i.e. 2.6 million additional entries and exits across all stations. By 23 January 2016, 537,327 passengers had been carried on the line with weekly figures consistently showing over 20,000 journeys made. Figures released on 31 May 2016 showed that 694,373 persons had been carried since 6 September 2015. Tweedbank station saw 183,918 passengers compared to a predicted 18,978 returns, while Galashiels had 104,593 against predicted 20,567. However, Eskbank, Gorebridge and Shawfair recorded less than their predicted usage. In September 2016, it was announced that one million passengers had been carried on the reopened line.

The final annual rail passenger usage figures for 2015/16 for each station were as follows: Edinburgh Waverley (21,723,960), Brunstane (165,978), Newcraighall (224,026), Shawfair (13,202), Eskbank (128,298), Newtongrange (86,298), Gorebridge (59,304), Stow (39,656), Galashiels (213,760) and Tweedbank (300,602). For the period 2017–18, patronage rose by 5.5% to 1.5 million.

== Operation ==
The route was operated by the ScotRail franchisee, Abellio ScotRail, which had taken control in April 2015, followed in April 2022 by Scottish Government-owned ScotRail.

=== Services ===
==== Timetabling ====
Monday to Saturday services are half-hourly in each direction until 20:00, with an hourly service provided after 20:00 and on Sundays. The first weekday service departs at 05:20 from Tweedbank with the last service leaving Edinburgh at 23:54. Departure times from Edinburgh are usually at 24 and 54 minutes past the hour, while from Tweedbank trains depart at 28 and 58 minutes past the hour; individual timings may vary by a minute or so. The trains starting close to on the hour do not call at Stow except in the peaks and evenings; the Sunday service stops at Stow. Most services operate between Edinburgh and Tweedbank except for a few morning peak services that continue to Glenrothes with Thornton via the Fife Circle Line and a few evening peak services that originate at Glenrothes with Thornton.

According to the Scottish transport minister Keith Brown, the timetable allows charter train promoters to run special excursion services within the hourly evening and Sunday services. Trains with 10:54, 12:54 and 14:24 departures from Edinburgh and 11:59, 13:59 and 15:28 departures from Tweedbank may be affected by scheduled steam trains.

From March 2020, the service was reduced to one train per hour as a result of the COVID-19 pandemic. The half-hourly service was restored in May 2022. As of the December 2024 timtetable, there are two trains per hour on weekdays and Saturdays, and one per hour on Sundays. The rush-hour service to and from Fife no longer runs.

==== Rolling stock ====
Class 158 DMUs were initially used on the line with Class 170s becoming the primary unit on the line from 2018. The latter operate a new 3-coach hourly service to Fife.

Network Rail indicated that three-car trains run initially, with the possibility of six-car formations using Class 170s cascaded from the Glasgow to Edinburgh via Falkirk Line once that route has been electrified. When, in 2013, vacancies were published for 18 trainee train driver positions at the planned Tweedbank depot, interest was substantial with 2,229 applications made for the posts. Upon the line's opening, one Class 170 unit bore a special livery advertising the tourist attractions of the Borders.

=== Fares ===
Initial plans announced in February 2014 indicated an end-to-end fare of less than £10 and stipulated an average fare across the Borders Railway working out at just £3.50. According to the fare structure published by Abellio ScotRail in June 2015, the adult single fare between Edinburgh and Tweedbank was given as £10.00, while the adult anytime day return is £16 or £11.20 off-peak.

=== Community rail partnership ===
With the launching of the railway, a community rail partnership was formed.

== Project benefits ==
Speaking in November 2012, Scottish transport minister Keith Brown predicted that the Borders Railway would bring inward investment into local communities as well as £33 million of benefits for the wider Scottish economy. The construction phase itself would support 400 jobs and would act as a catalyst to increased business development and housing as the area became within commuting distance of Edinburgh. Car journeys would be reduced by 60,000 peak trips per year, which would reduce carbon emissions and alleviate traffic and accidents on the A7 and A68 roads. The housing prediction came to pass when, as reported in the Edinburgh Evening News on 5 August 2013, a housing boom had been triggered along the line, with the number of new houses in Midlothian having doubled in the previous year, many of which were located in proximity to the line's stations. It is expected that 4,000 houses will be built in the Shawfair area in the next 25 years. On 20 August 2014, Alex Salmond, then First Minister of Scotland, announced to a meeting with members of the Scottish Borders Council that he expected the railway to benefit the Scottish economy by millions of pounds and that a feasibility study would be conducted to identify ways in which the line could boost tourism in the Borders region.

Research by the Moffat Centre for Travel and Tourism Business Development has shown that visitor numbers for Midlothian and Borders tourist attractions increased by 4% and 6.9% respectively during the first seven months of 2016, while Abbotsford House, Sir Walter Scott's former home near Galashiels, saw a significant revival in its fortunes as it reported a 12% rise in visits during 2016.

A study released on 15 June 2017 and commissioned by Transport Scotland and Borders Railway Blueprint Group showed that 50% of the line's users had moved to the region and that more than 80% of those who had changed jobs cited the railway as a factor in their decision. The study estimated that 40,000 car journeys had been saved per year as well as 22,000 fewer bus journeys. The report also indicated that 23% of visitors to the area would not have done so without the railway.

== Criticism ==
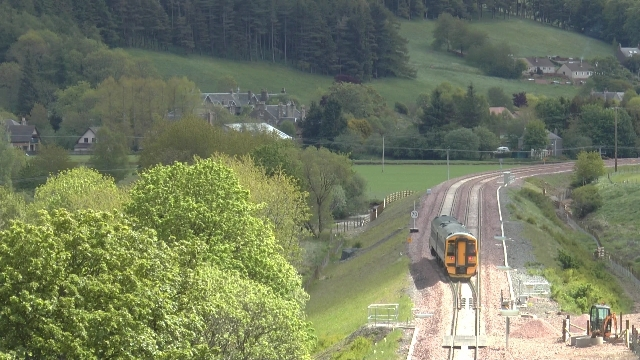
Class 158 entering the passing loop at Galabank Junction

=== Infrastructure capability ===
The line's construction has been described as resembling a "basic railway" built to a tight budget and incorporating cost-saving features, such as using elderly two-carriage diesel trains and running the line as single track. This is in contrast to the reopened Airdrie-Bathgate Rail Link, which was built as a double-track electrified railway from the outset. The difference between the two lines has been claimed by commentators to reflect scepticism toward the Borders Railway, which has existed since proposals were first made in the 1990s, as well as a reluctance to allow the project to become too ambitious. In particular, a 2011 cost-cutting exercise by Transport Scotland resulted in a new project specification which reduced the dynamic passing loops from their planned total length of 16 miles (26 km), and failed to future-proof the line by providing for all eight road bridges to be built to single-track width only, including the five bridges on the section between Tynehead and Stow where there were otherwise no other obstacles to doubling of the line.

Similarly, key underbridges on the section as far as Gorebridge were also built to single-track only, notably Bridges 16a and 24a over the A7 at Hardengreen and Gore Glen. This was in contrast to the quality of local roads built over the new line, including the A720, which is wider than required to accommodate possible extra road lanes. A press release by BAM Nuttall indicated that, in addition to the 30 miles (49 km) of new line, the Borders Railway project was funding 6 1/5 miles (10 km) of new roads. These late changes to the rail infrastructure were insisted upon by Network Rail to ensure that the project remained on budget and on time.

In addition, the lack of a siding anywhere on the line could make it difficult for rescue locomotives to recover a broken-down train without causing widespread disruption.

These fears were to prove justified as, during the line's first month of operation, there were well-publicised problems ranging from overcrowding resulting in passengers standing for the whole journey to timekeeping difficulties due to excessive dwell times at stations. Furthermore, signalling problems led to disruption on the line nearly a month after opening.

=== Timetabling ===
Whilst the Campaign for Borders Rail acknowledged that the half-hourly weekday stopping service would be useful for commuters, it questions whether this is the best use of a line, which could carry other types of traffic. The organisation had proposed a two-tier service, whereby both a half-hourly stopping train and an hourly limited express service would continue north of Gorebridge.

=== Failure to continue to Melrose ===
The Scott Wilson Report did not consider extending the line beyond Tweedbank due to the increased capital and operating costs of continuing further without a corresponding increase in passenger demand. The Campaign for Borders Rail consider nevertheless that there would have been a strong case for reaching Melrose on the basis of the town's role in Borders tourism.

=== Overcrowding ===
Since the opening of the Borders Railway, there have been many complaints about lack of seats, provision of ticket machines and lack of parking, especially at Tweedbank. The high demand has led ScotRail to increase some services to three or four carriage trains. However this and the general opening of the line have also contributed to there being a general shortage of train carriages across the ScotRail network, leading them to hire extra trains.

=== Service performance ===
The Campaign for Borders Rail claimed in February 2016 that only 35.5% of services were arriving on time at Tweedbank, which made the Borders Railway one of ScotRail's most poorly-performing services. In addition, reliability issues with the Class 158 units and traincrew problems resulted in at least one train being cancelled on 74 of the 143 days between 31 March 2016 and 20 August 2016. This comprised 14 days of severe disruption due to crew shortages, 18 days as a result of issues with the Class 158s and nine days for signalling failures. Crew shortages came about due to higher than expected levels of sickness as well as the difficulty of replacing staff during a popular period for annual leave. Reliability issues with the Class 158s were encountered during hot weather which caused radiators to overheat, particularly on steep gradients with a heavy load, as coolant systems became stressed. To deal with the problem, ScotRail sought to replace the faulty radiators with superior quality models. Signalling problems were mainly due to water ingress into axle counters as well as a faulty telecommunications link coupled with a failure on the part of the automated fault-finding system to detect the problem locations.

== Extending the line ==
=== Proposals ===
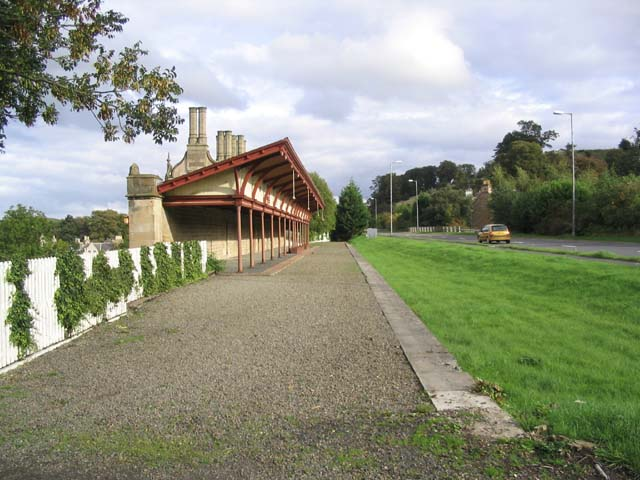
Melrose station remains, though the A6091 road now runs on the site of the Down platform

The Campaign for Borders Rail has called for the continuation of the line to Melrose and Hawick, and eventually to Carlisle. According to the group, Hawick suffered more than any other town in the Borders from the closure of the Waverley Route, and only the return of the railway could halt the area's economic decline. At the time of the closure of the Waverley Route, Hawick was a 70-minute journey from Edinburgh. At Melrose, the southbound station platform and building exist alongside the Melrose Bypass. Network Rail has confirmed that there is nothing to prevent the extension of the line beyond Tweedbank, although commentators have remarked that the bypass could pose problems. A major realignment of the road would be required, as well as the reinstatement of embankments and bridges.

Support for the reconstruction of the 70 miles (110 km) to Carlisle was given by Alex Salmond, then First Minister of Scotland, in April 2014. The comment was given as part of a speech in Carlisle in the run-up to the Scottish independence referendum. Reinstating the line would not only provide an opportunity to access the vast areas of forestry land around Kielder, but also provide a strategic diversionary route in the event of closure of the East Coast or West Coast Main Lines. Calls for the line's reopening have also come from the House of Commons Scottish Affairs Select Committee. Transport Scotland has ruled out a 17-mile (27 km) extension of the line from Tweedbank to Hawick in favour of connecting bus services and improved cycling and walking routes.

In May 2013, it was reported that Heriot-Watt University had been asked by Midlothian Council to carry out a feasibility study on a 10-mile (16 km) rail link connecting Penicuik with the Borders Railway. At least 6 miles (9.7 km) of the new line would follow the Edinburgh, Loanhead and Roslin Railway, the alignment of which is generally intact between Millerhill and Straiton. The Scottish Borders Council had previously considered the line for reopening in 2000 when it unsuccessfully applied for £1.4 million from the Scottish Public Transport Fund to develop proposals for the line.

In January 2018, John Lamont, Member of Parliament for Berwickshire, Roxburgh and Selkirk, called for the extension of the Borders Railway to the next phase of HS2.

=== Feasibility study ===
In June 2015, the Scottish Infrastructure Minister Keith Brown confirmed that talks were underway on the commissioning of a feasibility study for an extension to Hawick and Carlisle. Fergus Ewing, Tourism Minister, stated in July 2015 that he would not rule out a further extension, describing the line as "one of the most exciting and most effective events and transport services that there has ever been for tourism".

In September 2016, the Minister for Transport and the Islands, Humza Yousaf, announced that Transport Scotland would report by the end of 2017 on the case for extending the Borders Railway as part of a strategic transport projects review. One of the options to be considered will be routing the line to Carlisle via Langholm instead of following the original course of the Waverley Route through Newcastleton. A report, Borders Transport Corridors - Pre-Appraisal Executive Summary, was published by Transport Scotland on 5 March 2019. This contained a series of transport options for the Borders region, including the extension of the Borders Railway from Tweedbank to Hawick and Carlisle and reconnecting Berwick-upon-Tweed to the route. In April 2019, the UK Government gave its backing to full feasibility study into an extension of the line to Carlisle. In June 2019, it was announced as part of a Borderlands Growth Deal that £10 million had been allocated towards a study into the viability of a Borders Railway extension to Carlisle. The feasibility study was subsequently reannounced in February 2025, with Turner & Townsend being appointed in May as project managers for the study.

On 30 May 2017, the Campaign for Borders Rail published its Summary Case for a New Cross-Border Rail Link which was distributed to Parliamentary candidates before the General Election. It estimated the costs of rebuilding the line to Carlisle at £644 million at 2012 prices and added that 96% of the trackbed remained unobstructed.

== Electrification ==
In June 2019, the Scottish Government confirmed it was considering electrifying the railway.

Transport Scotland has put decarbonisation and electrification, possibly partial, high on its agenda and some planning and application work started on Borders electrification in 2022. The power supply capacity is highly used at the north end of the line though grid feeders are being upgraded. To allow for this and ensure enough future capacity, a grid feeder is being installed at Tweedbank.

In September 2025, Transport Secretary Fiona Hyslop announced that the plans to electrify the Borders Railway would go ahead, along with further electrification in Fife. ScotRail is to procure new battery electric trains to run on the line, replacing the existing stock. Sections at either end of the line will be electrified, with trains running on batteries between Glenesk Viaduct and Bowshank Tunnel. Electrification work started in February 2026. The construction works are estimated to be completed by 2029, with the new trains running by 2031.
