= Gorebridge =

Village in Midlothian, Scotland

Coordinates: 55.843576°N 3.05°W

Gorebridge: Scottish Gaelic: An Drochaid Nuadh; Scots: Gorebrigg
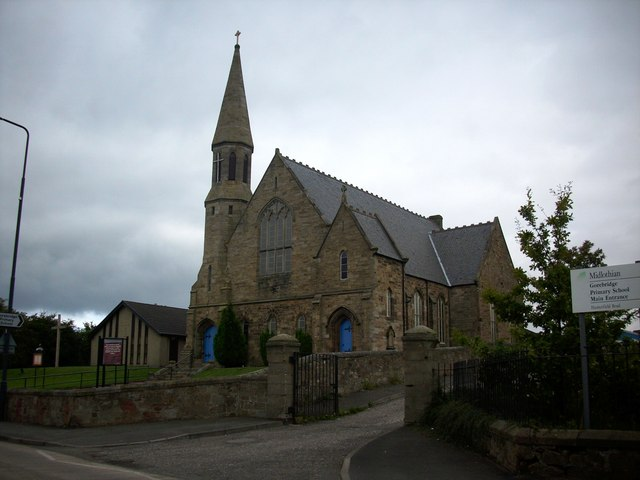
- Gorebridge Parish Church

- Location within Midlothian
- Population: 8,040 (2020)
- OS grid reference: NT343616
- Council area: Midlothian
- Lieutenancy area: Midlothian
- Country: Scotland
- Sovereign state: United Kingdom
- Post town: Gorebridge
- Postcode district: EH23
- Dialling code: 01875
- Police: Scotland
- Fire: Scottish
- Ambulance: Scottish
- UK Parliament: Midlothian
- Scottish Parliament: Midlothian South, Tweeddale and Lauderdale

Gorebridge is a former mining village in Midlothian, Scotland.

Gorebridge has an annual Gala Day which always takes place on the 3rd Saturday in June. This is much like a town fair, with rides and games. The gala day has a tradition of picking a Town King and Queen from the primary schools.

Gorebridge has four primary schools, Gorebridge Primary, Stobhill Primary, St Andrews RC Primary and Gore Glen Primary. Greenhall High School used to serve the town but closed down in 1994. Local children attend nearby Newbattle Community High School, St David's RC High School or Lasswade High School. There is a leisure centre, library and Vogrie Country Park in Gorebridge.

Gorebridge's local graffiti scene is very active with major involvement with the Gorebridge based vandal group "dscpl" containing many notable members such as Scorch and Trash Haus.

Gorebridge's local football team is Arniston Rangers who were founded in 1878 and play home games at Newbyres Park in the East of Scotland League Second Division.

Annette Crosbie, known to many as the long suffering wife of Victor Meldrew, played by fellow Scot Richard Wilson in the BBC comedy series One Foot in the Grave, is a former resident of Gorebridge. The Reverend David Arnott, Moderator of the General Assembly of the Church of Scotland for 2011–12, was minister at Gorebridge Parish Church in the 1970s.

On 6 September 2015 Gorebridge saw the return of the Waverley Line with a new station built on the site of the original station. This gives rail access to the Borders and Edinburgh Waverley railway station.

In the Gore Glen there is a shallow cave, named "The King's Cave". According to legend a thief used to steal cattle and hide in this nearby cave. It is not, as some think, named after Robert the Bruce, who was said to have hidden here after defeat at the hands of the English. There are 29 listed buildings in Gorebridge including one Category B building (Harvieston Lodge), and two Category C buildings (Gorebridge old station and the Post Office).

On 30 August 2020, police broke up a party of 300 people at the Mansion house of Kirkhill in Gorebridge and issued a fine to the organiser. Scottish Government rules during the coronavirus pandemic at the time were for a maximum of eight people from three households to meet inside at one time.

In 2021, Gorebridge Leisure Centre was used as a mass vaccination centre during the coronavirus pandemic

== History ==
The village was founded by the Dewar family of Vogrie House. It got its name from the bridge across the River Gore, a tributary of the South Esk. It was the home of Stobsmill, Scotland's first gunpowder mill, at the Gore Water, that started operating in 1794 and closed in 1875. The settlement greatly increased in size after the opening of the Waverley Line in 1847. Its commanding views towards the Pentland Hills made it a popular holiday destination in the 19th Century. In the 1860s century a coal mine called Emily Pit was opened, the village grew as miners came and a railway was built to take the coal from the mine. The Emily Pit and Gore Pit (another coal mine) were together renamed the Arniston Colliery which closed in 1962. The railway line was closed in 1969 and reopened in 2015.

== Notable people ==
- Annie S. Swan Writer and suffragette
- Annette Crosbie Actress famous for One Foot in the Grave
- David Levison Church of Scotland Minister

== See also ==
- Arniston House
