= Tweedbank railway station =

Railway station in Scottish Borders, Scotland

Tweedbank Scottish Gaelic: Bruach Thuaidh
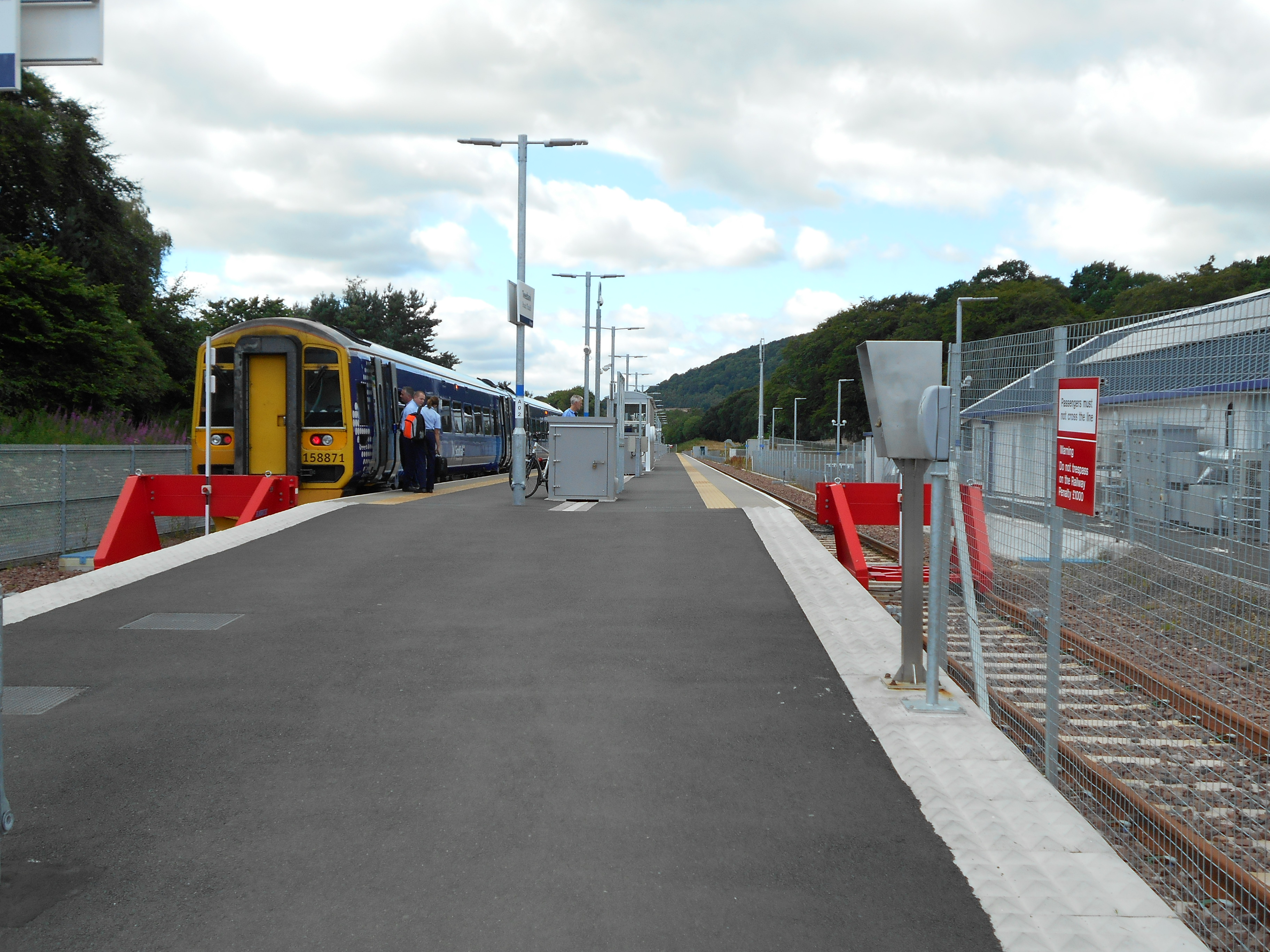

General information
- Location: Tweedbank, Scottish Borders; Scotland
- Coordinates: 55°36′21″N 2°45′32″W
- Grid reference: NT522349
- Owner: Network Rail
- Manager: ScotRail
- Platforms: 2
- Tracks: 2

Other information
- Station code: TWB

History
- Original company: Network Rail

Key dates
- 6 September 2015: Opened

Passengers
- 2020/21: ▼38,476
- 2021/22: ▲0.204 million
- 2022/23: ▲0.302 million
- 2023/24: ▲0.399 million
- 2024/25: ▲0.406 million
Location
- Location within Scottish Borders
Notes
- Passenger statistics from the Office of Rail and Road

Tweedbank is a railway station on the Borders Railway, which runs between Edinburgh Waverley and Tweedbank. The station, situated 35 miles 34 chains (57 km) south-east of Edinburgh Waverley, serves the village of Tweedbank in Scottish Borders, Scotland. It is owned by Network Rail and managed by ScotRail.

== History ==
The station was built by BAM Nuttall, and opened on 6 September 2015.

== Facilities ==
The station design uses a central platform with a line on either side. There is a 235-space car parking with 13 accessible spaces. There is a cafe and an accessible toilet which is only open when the cafe is open. There are waiting shelters on the platform. Bike racks are also provided at the station.

== Bus Connections ==
Borders Buses route 67 (to Galashiels and Berwick-Upon-Tweed) and route 68 (to Galashiels and Jedburgh) stop directly in front of the station.

== Services ==
As of the May 2021 timetable change, the station is served by an hourly service between Edinburgh Waverley and Tweedbank, with a half-hourly service operating at peak times (Monday to Saturday). Some peak time trains previously continued to Glenrothes with Thornton. All services are operated by ScotRail.

Rolling stock used: Class 158 Express Sprinter and Class 170 Turbostar

Preceding station	National Rail	Following station
Galashiels	ScotRail; Borders Railway	Terminus
