= Tweedbank =

Coordinates: 55.603056°N 2.766944°W

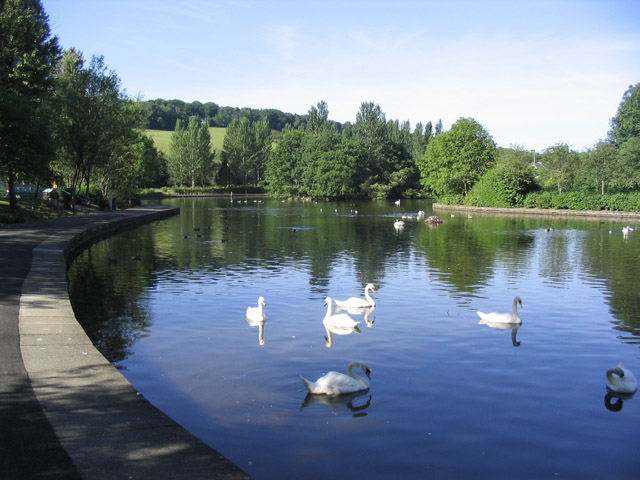
- The man-made Gunknowe Loch, Tweedbank

- Location within the Scottish Borders
- Population: 2,020 (2020)
- OS grid reference: NT519347
  - Edinburgh: 29 mi (47 km)
  - London: 303 mi (488 km)
- Council area: Scottish Borders
- Lieutenancy area: Roxburgh, Ettrick and Lauderdale
- Country: Scotland
- Sovereign state: United Kingdom
- Post town: Galashiels
- Postcode district: TD1
- Dialling code: 01896
- Police: Scotland
- Fire: Scottish
- Ambulance: Scottish
- UK Parliament: Berwickshire, Roxburgh and Selkirk
- Scottish Parliament: Midlothian South, Tweeddale and Lauderdale

Tweedbank is a town south-east of Galashiels in the Scottish Borders. It is part of the county of Roxburghshire. It is an outer suburb of Galashiels, on the other (eastern) side of the River Tweed. The population of Tweedbank at the latest census is 2,101.

== Geography ==
Tweedbank, as the name suggests, sits adjacent to the River Tweed, and approximately 500 metres (550 yd) down river from Abbotsford House, the historic home of Sir Walter Scott. Tweedbank has a pond known as Gunknowe Loch, a small shop, and a railway station.

== History ==
The settlement was started in the early 1970s on the land of a farm whose original house still stands (serving as a boarding cattery) adjacent to the community centre (known locally as 'The Barns'). The original settlement was built by Scottish Special Housing and included the streets of Neidpath Court, Blakehope Court, Hareshaw Bank, Stobshaw Place, Stobshaw Terrace and Haining Drive. In the 1980s Bett Housing (later to be taken over by Lema Homes) began building on the site at the entry of Tweedbank from Galashiels; this estate included the streets Abbotslea, Riverside Drive, Abbotsferry Road, Lowood Park, Ladymoss and Heathery Rigg. To locals this area was often known as 'the Betts'.

The 1990s saw two developments by Eildon Housing Association, namely Jura Drive and Craw Wood, with private housing being built around Tweedbank View and Tweedbank Drive. The final development in the 2000s was constructed by Barratt Homes in the area around Weavers Linn, built on the former Abbotsford to Lowood road (later a footpath).

Before the advent of the new town of Tweedbank, the area was occupied by the farms of Tweedbank and Bridgend Mains . The new housing estate lies in the civil parish of Melrose in the former county of Roxburghshire.

== Education, sport and landmarks ==
The original primary school near the loch was a small school of fewer than 100 pupils and composite classes. In 1996 this changed, due to a slightly increasing population, and the school was now able to teach students in separate classrooms organised by their year of schooling. In the early 2000s the school expanded due to a significant increase in the local population.

In addition to residential housing and the Primary School, Tweedbank also boasts an all weather sports complex, an Astroturf football and hockey pitch, an indoor bowling club, a large children's all-weather play area, and the Gun Knowe Loch, which is actually a man-made lake. The loch is popular with locals due to its abundance of swans and ducks. Amenities located next to the Gun Knowe Loch include a local shop, a hairdressers, and the restaurant, Shanghai Banquet. Government offices for Agriculture & Fisheries and the Scottish Public Pensions Agency can also be found within Tweedbank. It is also home to the Tempest Brewing Company.

Tweedbank is the site of the biggest industrial estate in the region.

== Culture ==
Each year in May, the village celebrates a week-long 'Tweedbank Fair' in which a local 'Tweedbank Lad and Lass' (together with two attendants each) are appointed from members of the school's Primary Seven class.

== Transport ==
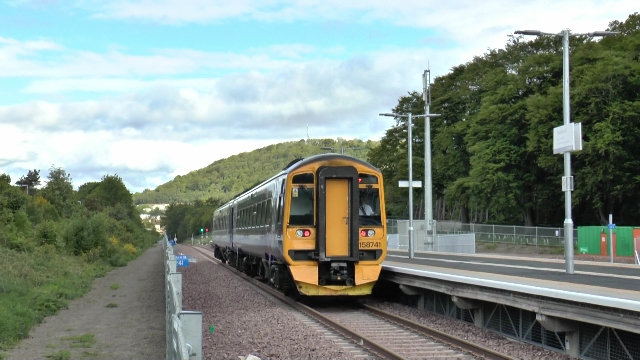
Class 158 DMU at Tweedbank railway station

The village is served by Tweedbank railway station, the terminus of the Borders Railway that runs between the Central Borders and Edinburgh. Trains run half-hourly on weekdays, and hourly in evenings and at weekends.

Tweedbank Drive is the main thoroughfare through the village, leading from Galashiels towards Melrose, with a number of roads adjoining. Driving eastwards, on the left adjacent firstly is Abbotsferry Road. The next turn off is on the right-hand side, Weavers Linn leading to The Beeches. Other roads leading from the main thoroughfare are Cotgreen Road, Honeylees Drive, Essenside Drive, Jura Drive and Craw Wood.

== See also ==
- List of places in the Scottish Borders
- List of places in Scotland
