= Midlothian =

Council area of Scotland

Midlothian: Meadhan Lodainn (Scottish Gaelic); Midlowden (Scots)
- Lieutenancy and council area
- Coat of arms

- Midlothian shown within Scotland
- Coordinates: 55°53′39″N 3°04′07″W
- Sovereign state: United Kingdom
- Country: Scotland
- Unitary authority: 1 April 1996
- Administrative HQ: Dalkeith

Government
  - Type: Council
  - Body: Midlothian Council
  - Control: No overall control
  - MPs: Kirsty McNeill (L)
  - MSPs: 2 MSPs: Colin Beattie (SNP); Christine Grahame (SNP)

Area
  - Total: 137 sq mi (354 km^{2})
  - Rank: 21st

Population (2024)
  - Total: 99,880
  - Rank: 22nd
  - Density: 730/sq mi (282/km^{2})
- Time zone: UTC+0 (GMT)
  - Summer (DST): UTC+1 (BST)
- ISO 3166 code: GB-MLN
- GSS code: S12000019
- Website: midlothian.gov.uk

Midlothian (/mɪdˈloʊðiən/; Scottish Gaelic: Meadhan Lodainn) is a registration county, lieutenancy area and one of 32 council areas of Scotland used for local government. Midlothian lies in the east-central Lowlands, bordering the City of Edinburgh council area, East Lothian and the Scottish Borders. The modern council area was formed in 1975 when the historic county of Midlothian, also known as Edinburghshire, was altered substantially as part of local government reforms; its southern part formed a new Midlothian District within the Region of Lothian, whilst areas on the peripheries were assigned to other districts and the city of Edinburgh, which had always been autonomous to an extent, was formally separated as the City of Edinburgh District. In 1996 Midlothian became a unitary authority area, using the same name and territory as in 1975.

== History ==
Map contrasting the area comprising Midlothian council (dark blue) within the historic county of Midlothian (light blue).

Midlothian County Council was abolished in 1975 under the Local Government (Scotland) Act 1973, which abolished Scotland's counties and burghs as administrative areas and created a new two-tier system of upper-tier regions and lower-tier districts. Most of Midlothian's territory went to a new district called Midlothian within the Lothian region. The Midlothian district was smaller than the area of the pre-1975 county, parts of which went to other districts: Currie, Balerno, Ratho and Newbridge to the city of Edinburgh; Musselburgh burgh and parish of Inveresk (which included the villages of Inveresk, Wallyford and Whitecraig) to East Lothian; East Calder, Mid Calder and West Calder) and the Midlothian part of Livingston to West Lothian; Heriot and Stow parishes to the Ettrick and Lauderdale district of the Borders region.

The boundaries of the historic county of Midlothian, including the city of Edinburgh, are still used for some limited official purposes connected with land registration, being a registration county. The Midlothian lieutenancy area corresponds to the current council area rather than the historic county. The last lord-lieutenant of the county of Midlothian was made lord-lieutenant for the new district of Midlothian when the reforms came into effect in 1975. The former county council's headquarters in Edinburgh became the offices of the new Lothian Regional Council, whilst the Midlothian District Council established its headquarters in Dalkeith.

In 1991 the council built itself a new headquarters called Midlothian House at 40-46 Buccleuch Street in Dalkeith.

The Lothian region was abolished in 1996. The four districts in the region, including Midlothian, became unitary council areas. The reconstituted Midlothian Council continues to be based at Midlothian House in Dalkeith.

=== Central government ===
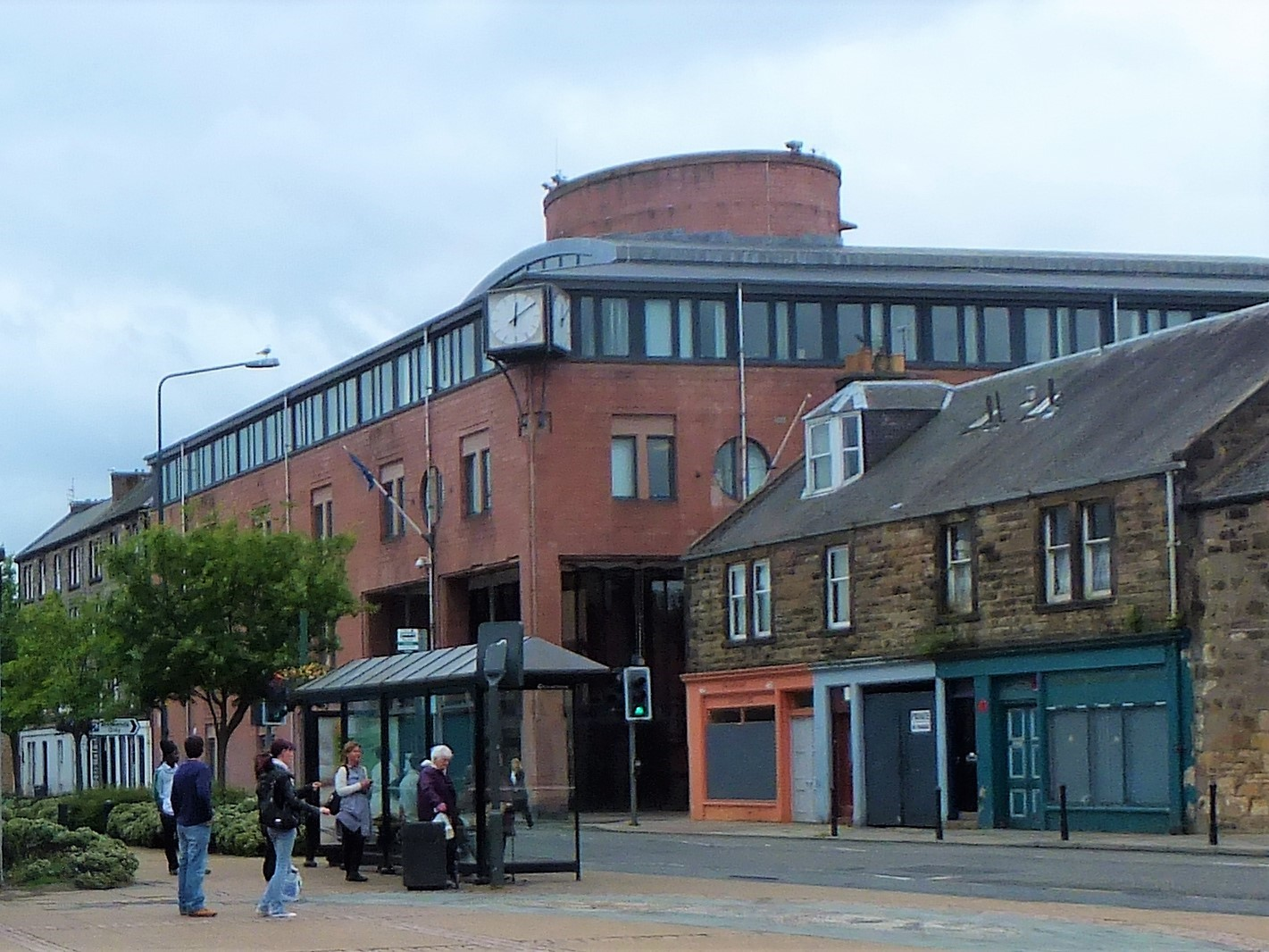
Midlothian House, Dalkeith

There is a Midlothian constituency of the House of Commons.

There was a Midlothian constituency of the Scottish Parliament up to the 2011 elections when it was divided between Midlothian North and Musselburgh and Midlothian South, Tweeddale and Lauderdale.

== Geography ==
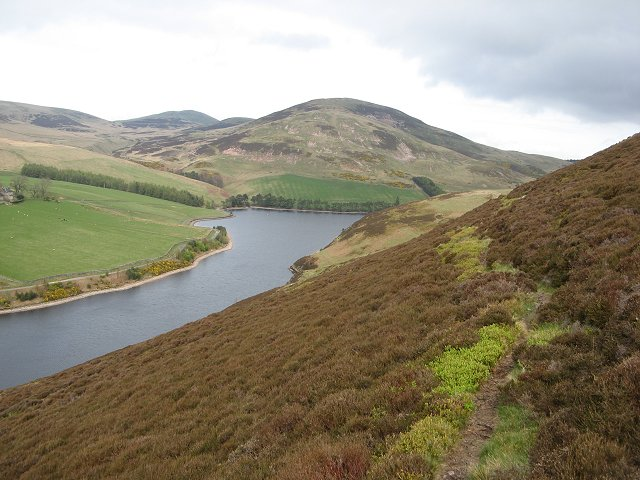
The Glencorse Reservoir in the Pentland Hills

The Midlothian council area contains the towns of Dalkeith, Bonnyrigg and Penicuik, as well as a portion of the Pentland Hills Regional Park, Rosslyn Chapel and Dalkeith Palace.

== Demography ==
=== Languages ===
The 2022 Scottish Census reported that out of 93,255 residents aged three and over, 31,635 (33.9%) considered themselves able to speak or read the Scots language.

The 2022 Scottish Census reported that out of 93,257 residents aged three and over, 712 (0.8%) considered themselves able to speak or read Gaelic.

== Settlements ==
The largest settlements in Midlothian.

Largest settlements by population:

Settlement	Population (2020)
Bonnyrigg	18,320
Penicuik	16,150
Dalkeith	14,330
Mayfield	13,690
Gorebridge	8,040
Loanhead	6,820
Danderhall	3,160
Rosewell	2,020
Roslin	1,770
Bilston	1,440

== Places of interest ==
- Arniston House
- Borthwick Castle
- Castlelaw Fort
- Crichton Castle
- Dalhousie Castle
- Dalkeith Palace
- Flotterstone
- Hawthornden Castle
- Midlothian Snowsports Centre, Hillend
- National Mining Museum
- Loanhead Memorial Park
- Mavisbank House
- Melville Castle
- Newbattle Abbey
- Pentland Hills
- Roslin Castle
- Roslin Glen Country Park
- Roslin Institute
- Rosslyn Chapel
- Tyne-Esk Walk
- Vogrie Country Park
- Wallace's Cave

== Transport ==
Midlothian has a modern road network as well as some rural single-track roads. The Borders Railway runs between Tweedbank to Edinburgh, with four stations in Midlothian – Shawfair, Eskbank, Newtongrange and Gorebridge.

== Notable people associated with Midlothian ==
- William Drummond of Hawthornden (1585–1649), Scottish poet.
- Princess Margaret of Scotland (1598–1600), daughter of James VI and I of Scotland and England (born Dalkeith Palace)
- John Clerk of Penicuik, 2nd Baronet (1676–1755), was a Scottish politician, lawyer, judge, composer and architect.
- William Robertson (1721–1793), historian, minister in the Church of Scotland, and Principal of the University of Edinburgh
- Robert Smith (1722–1777), American architect, based in Philadelphia, Pennsylvania, born in Dalkeith
- Hector Macneill (1746–1818), poet and songwriter, born near Roslin
- John Clerk, Lord Eldin (1757–1832), Scottish judge, lived in Lasswade for several years.
- Sir Walter Scott (1771–1832) wrote the novel The Heart of Midlothian and lived at Lasswade Cottage (now Sir Walter Scott's Cottage) in Lasswade from 1798 to 1804, where he wrote his Grey Brother, translation of Goetz von Berlichingen, etc. and was visited by Wordsworth.
- William Tennant (1784–1848), the author of Anster Fair, was parish schoolmaster in Lasswade from 1816 to 1819.
- Thomas de Quincey (1785–1859), author of Confessions of an English Opium-Eater (1822), lived in Man's Bush Cottage (now De Quincey Cottage), Polton, from 1840 until his death in 1859.
- Thomas Murray (1792–1872), the Gallovidian author, died in Lasswade.
- Anne Richelieu Lamb (1807–1878), feminist writer
- William Ewart Gladstone (1809–1898), MP for Midlothian 1880–1895 and conducted his famous Midlothian campaign across the UK in 1880
- Patrick Edward Dove (1815–1873), mainly remembered for his book The Theory of Human Progression, born at Lasswade
- John Lawson Johnston (1839–1900), the creator of Bovril, born at Roslin.
- Charles W. Nibley (1849–1931), Scottish-American religious leader in the Church of Jesus Christ of Latter-day Saints (LDS Church). Nibley was served as second counselor in the First Presidency to Heber J. Grant (1925–31), and Presiding Bishop (1907–25).
- Charles Thomson Rees Wilson (1869–1959) of Glencorse, Nobel prize-winning physicist.
- George Forrest (1873–1932), a plant collector who gained fame with his expeditions to the far east who spent a significant part of his early years in Loanhead.
- Sir William MacTaggart (1903–1981), artist, and grandson of the artist William McTaggart, he became President of the Society of Scottish Artists, President of the Royal Scottish Academy, and Trustee of the National Museum of Antiquities.
- Charles Forte, Baron Forte (1908–2007), the hotelier, worked in an Italian cafe in Loanhead, on his arrival in Scotland from Italy.
- Karl Miller (1931–2014), founding editor of the London Review of Books and Lord Northcliffe Professor of Modern English Literature at University College, London (1974–1992), born in Straiton.
- Annette Crosbie (born 1934), actress, born in Gorebridge
- Ishbel MacAskill (1941–2011), heritage activist and traditional Scottish Gaelic singer and teacher
- Fish (singer) (born 1958), former lead singer Marillion 1981-1987 and song based on his birth county, Heart of Midlothian (Royal Mile)
- Gary Naysmith from Loanhead (born 1978), international Footballer, played for Heart of Midlothian and Everton, named Scottish PFA Young Player of the Year in 1998, won the Scottish Cup with Hearts in 1998
- Darren Fletcher (born 1984), from Mayfield. international footballer, holds the record of being the youngest player to captain the national side, was part of the Manchester United squad that won the UEFA Champions League in 2008
- Steven Whittaker from Bonnyrigg, (born 1984), international footballer, played mainly for Hibernian and Rangers

== Schools in Midlothian ==
=== Primary schools ===
- Bilston Primary School, Bilston
- Bonnyrigg Primary School, Bonnyrigg
- Burnbrae Primary School, Hopefield
- Cornbank St James Primary School, Penicuik
- Cuiken Primary School, Penicuik
- Danderhall Primary School, Danderhall
- Easthouses Primary School, Mayfield
- Gore Glen Primary School, Gorebridge
- Gorebridge Primary School, Gorebridge
- Hawthornden Primary School, Bonnyrigg
- King's Park Primary School, Dalkeith
- Lasswade Primary School, Lasswade
- Lawfield Primary School, Mayfield
- Loanhead Primary School, Loanhead
- Mauricewood Primary School, Penicuik
- Mayfield Primary School, Mayfield
- Moorfoot Primary School, North Middleton
- Newtongrange Primary School, Newtongrange
- Paradykes Primary School, Loanhead
- Rosewell Primary School, Rosewell
- Roslin Primary School, Roslin
- Sacred Heart RC Primary School, Penicuik
- St Andrews's RC Primary School Gorebridge
- St David's RC Primary School Dalkeith
- St Luke's RC Primary School, Mayfield
- St Margaret's RC Primary School, Loanhead
- St Mary's RC Primary School, Bonnyrigg
- St Matthew's RC Primary School, Rosewell
- Stobhill Primary School, Gorebridge
- Strathesk Primary School, Penicuik
- Tynewater Primary School, Pathhead
- Woodburn Primary School, Woodburn

=== Secondary schools ===
- Beeslack High School, Penicuik
- Dalkeith High School, Dalkeith
- Lasswade High School Centre, Bonnyrigg
- Newbattle Community High School, Mayfield
- Penicuik High School, Penicuik
- St. David's RC High School, Dalkeith

=== Special schools ===
- Saltersgate School, Dalkeith
- Top Services Pathhead

== Twin towns and sister cities ==
Midlothian is twinned with Komárom-Esztergom, Hungary and Kreis Heinsberg, Germany. Since 1978 it is a sister city with Midlothian, Illinois, a suburb of Chicago.
