= Whitrope =

Coordinates: 55.299°N 2.746°W

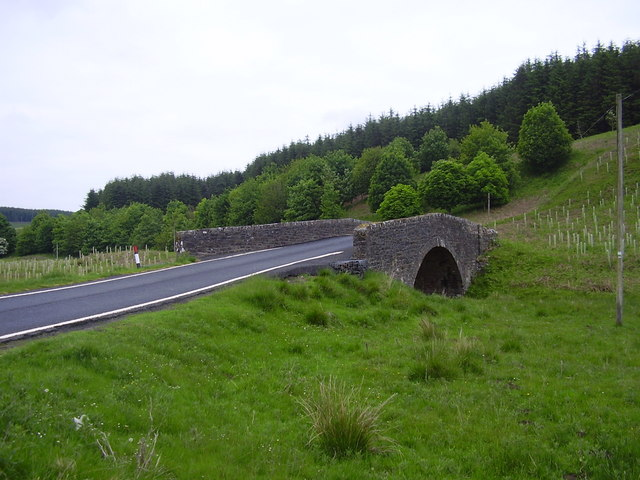
The Whitrope Burn

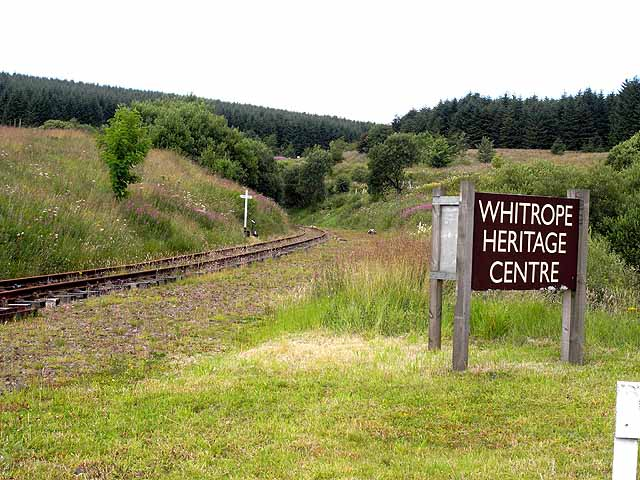
Whitrope Heritage centre.

Whitrope is a densely forested, but sparsely populated area, high in the Southern Upland hills in the south central Scottish Borders in the former county of Roxburghshire. Situated some 12 miles south from Hawick on the B6399 road, the Scottish watershed passes through the area; Whitrope Burn draining south towards Newcastleton and Flosh Burn draining north towards Hawick.

The main features are the large forests managed by the Forestry Commission, and artefacts of Railway heritage. The Waverley Railway line passed over the whitrope summit in the Whitrope Tunnel at an elevation of 1,006 feet or 307 metres. The Rail Heritage Centre is slightly south-west of this and is the headquarters of the Waverley Route Heritage Association. A length of track has been re-installed and there is a collection of rail rolling stock at the Whitrope Siding station.

A network of Heritage Trails has been established, including the Ritson Trail, named after William Ritson, a contractor from the Victorian era, and responsible for the Shankend Viaduct, Riccarton Junction, and Whitrope Tunnel and summit.

== See also ==
- Liddesdale
- Waverley Line, Whitrope Siding, Whitrope Tunnel
- List of places in the Scottish Borders
- List of places in Scotland
