= List of listed buildings in Cavers, Scottish Borders =

This is a list of listed buildings in the parish of Cavers in the Scottish Borders, Scotland.

== List ==
| Name | Location | Date Listed | Grid Ref. (Note: Sometimes known as OSGB36, the grid reference (where provided) is based on the British national grid reference system used by the Ordnance Survey. • "Guide to National Grid". Ordnance Survey. • "Get-a-map". Ordnance Survey.) | Geo-coordinates | Notes | LB Number (Note: Historic Environment Scotland assign a unique alphanumeric identifier to each designated site in Scotland, for listed buildings this always begins with "LB", for example "LB12345".) | Image |
|---|---|---|---|---|---|---|---|
| Denholm Village, Sunnyside, Somerville House, Bonshaw And Heatherlie | | | | 55°27′30″N 2°41′06″W | Category C(S) | 2056 | Upload another image |
| Barns Viaduct (Stobs Viaduct) | | | | 55°22′48″N 2°46′59″W | Category B | 2063 | Upload Photo |
| Denholm, The Green, Leyden Monument | | | | 55°27′28″N 2°41′04″W | Category C(S) | 2053 | Upload another image |
| Spittal Tower Or Towerburn | | | | 55°27′06″N 2°39′20″W | Category B | 2065 | Upload Photo |
| Kirkton Church (Church Of Scotland) Including Graveyard, Boundary Walls, Gatepiers And Gates | | | | 55°25′03″N 2°43′38″W | Category C(S) | 2046 | Upload Photo |
| Henlawshiel Obelisk | | | | 55°25′06″N 2°42′15″W | Category B | 2047 | Upload Photo |
| Stobs Castle | | | | 55°22′11″N 2°46′50″W | Category B | 2066 | Upload Photo |
| Old Church In Policies Of Cavers House | | | | 55°25′55″N 2°43′41″W | Category B | 2045 | Upload Photo |
| Orchard | | | | 55°25′35″N 2°45′11″W | Category B | 2048 | Upload Photo |
| Row Of Houses On The South Side Of The Green And Including The Following Properties:-The Cross Keys, P.H. House (J. Welsh) House (T.B. Hamilton) Shop-Grocer (Scott) | | | | 55°27′27″N 2°41′02″W | Category B | 2054 | Upload another image |
| Whitrope Tunnel, Viaduct And Culvert | | | | 55°17′30″N 2°44′58″W | Category B | 49311 | Upload Photo |
| Bridge Over Teviot At Denholm | | | | 55°27′38″N 2°41′06″W | Category C(S) | 2059 | Upload Photo |
| Stobs Castle Estate, Gatepiers And Black Lodge | | | | 55°22′19″N 2°46′35″W | Category C(S) | 2062 | Upload Photo |
| Cavers House | | | | 55°25′51″N 2°43′39″W | Category B | 2051 | Upload Photo |
| Westgate Hall, Denholm | | | | 55°27′24″N 2°41′05″W | Category A | 2052 | Upload another image |
| Shankend Viaduct | | | | 55°20′44″N 2°45′22″W | Category B | 2064 | Upload another image |
| Birthplace Of Dr John Leyden | | | | 55°27′32″N 2°41′03″W | Category B | 2057 | Upload another image |
| Lodge Entrance To Stobs Castle Woodfoot | | | | 55°22′52″N 2°46′51″W | Category B | 2060 | Upload Photo |
| Old Mill To Rear Of Greenview | | | | 55°27′28″N 2°41′09″W | Category B | 158 | Upload another image |
| Stobs Castle - Bridge | | | | 55°22′15″N 2°46′40″W | Category B | 2068 | Upload Photo |
| Cavers Church And Graveyard | | | | 55°26′06″N 2°43′54″W | Category B | 2044 | Upload Photo |

== Key ==
The scheme for classifying buildings in Scotland is:

- Category A: "buildings of national or international importance, either architectural or historic; or fine, little-altered examples of some particular period, style or building type."
- Category B: "buildings of regional or more than local importance; or major examples of some particular period, style or building type, which may have been altered."
- Category C: "buildings of local importance; lesser examples of any period, style, or building type, as originally constructed or moderately altered; and simple traditional buildings which group well with other listed buildings."

In March 2016 there were 47,288 listed buildings in Scotland. Of these, 8% were Category A, and 50% were Category B, with the remaining 42% being Category C.
