= Steele Road railway station =

Disused railway station in Steele Road, Scottish Borders

Steele Road

General information
- Location: Steele Road, Scottish Borders; Scotland
- Coordinates: 55.2292°N 2.753°W
- Grid reference: NY522930
- Platforms: 2

Other information
- Status: Disused

History
- Original company: Border Union Railway
- Pre-grouping: North British Railway
- Post-grouping: LNER; British Rail (Scottish Region)

Key dates
- 2 June 1862: Opened
- 6 January 1969: Closed
Location

Steele Road railway station served the hamlet of Steele Road, Scottish Borders, Scotland, from 1862 to 1969 on the Border Union Railway.

== History ==
The station, situated south of an unnamed road, was opened on 2 June 1862 by the Border Union Railway. The station was served by one train per day until a full timetable was introduced on 1 July. To the south end of the down platform was the signal box. It was damaged in an arson attack on 27 May 1914 and replaced shortly after. Goods traffic ceased on 28 December 1964 and the station was downgraded to an unstaffed halt on 27 March 1967. It closed to passengers on 6 January 1969. Since closure, the station offices and house have been converted into a residential property.

In 2007, following his death, the ashes the BAFTA award winning location sound recordist Peter Handford were scattered at the site. Handford had made some of his most well known steam locomotive recordings during days and nights spent at the station.

== Accidents and incidents ==
- On 12 May 1907, nine-year-old Walter Deas, whilst waiting for a goods train going towards Hawick to pass, was knocked down by an oncoming pilot engine on the other line. His injuries were fatal.

Preceding station	Historical railways	Following station
Riccarton Junction; Line and station closed	Border Union Railway	Newcastleton; Line and station closed
