= Whitrope Siding =

Heritage railway station on the former Waverley Route

Coordinates: 55°17′35″N 2°44′55″W

Whitrope Siding was a trailing short siding or spur off the "up" (southbound) line, an associated trailing cross-over between up and down lines, a pair of railway cottages and a signal box on the Waverley Line or Waverley Route. It was used as a goods loading bay. The site is now the home of the Whitrope Heritage Centre, as well as the current terminus of the heritage Border Union Railway.

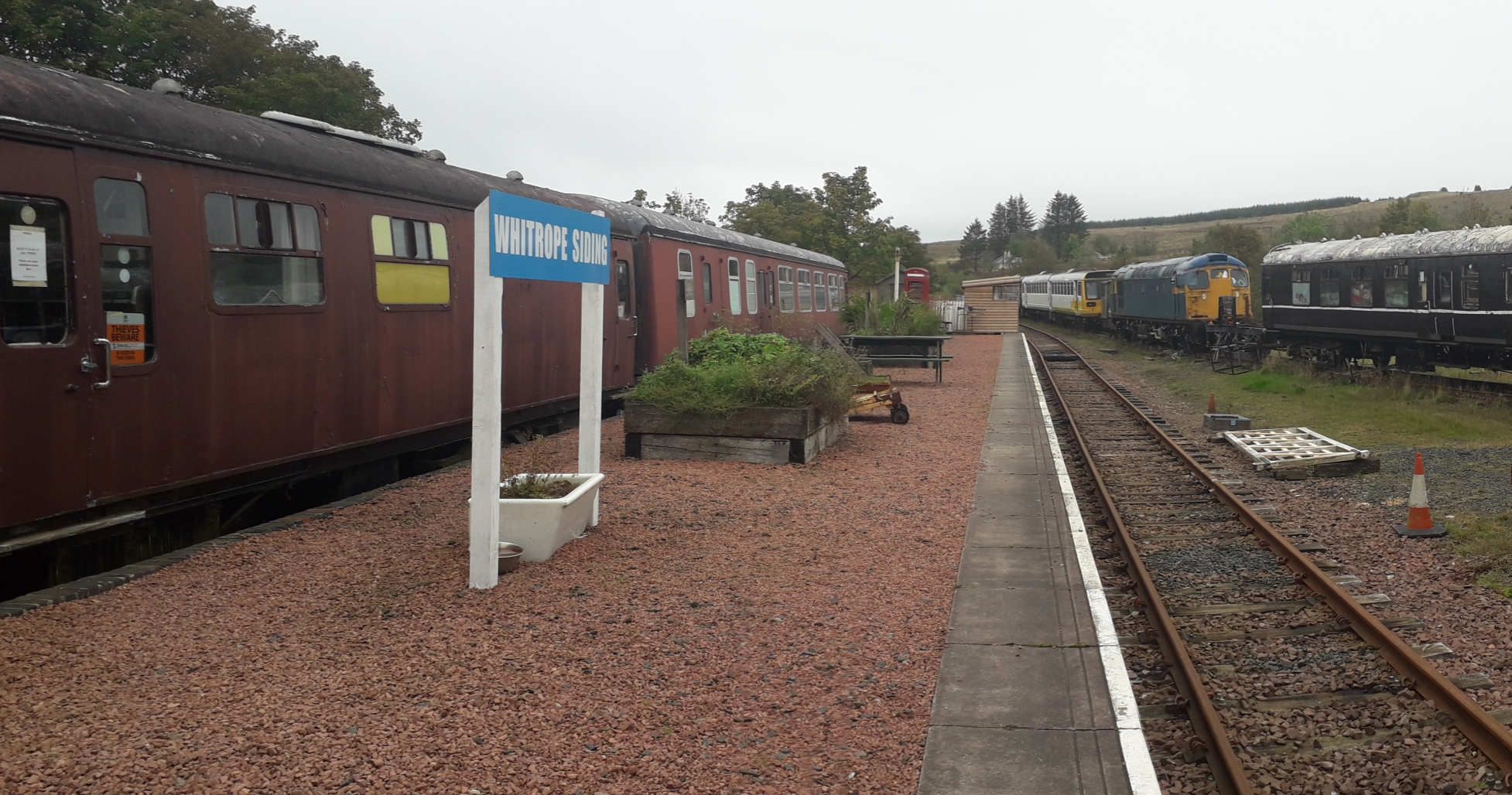
Whitrope Siding, the station at Whitrope, in 2020

The siding is located just south of the highest point on the line, the famous Whitrope Summit, 1,006 feet (307 m) above sea level. It is approximately 330 yards (300 m) south from Whitrope Tunnel, and 2 1/2 miles (4.0 km) north from Hermitage, Scottish Borders.

== Whitrope Heritage Centre ==
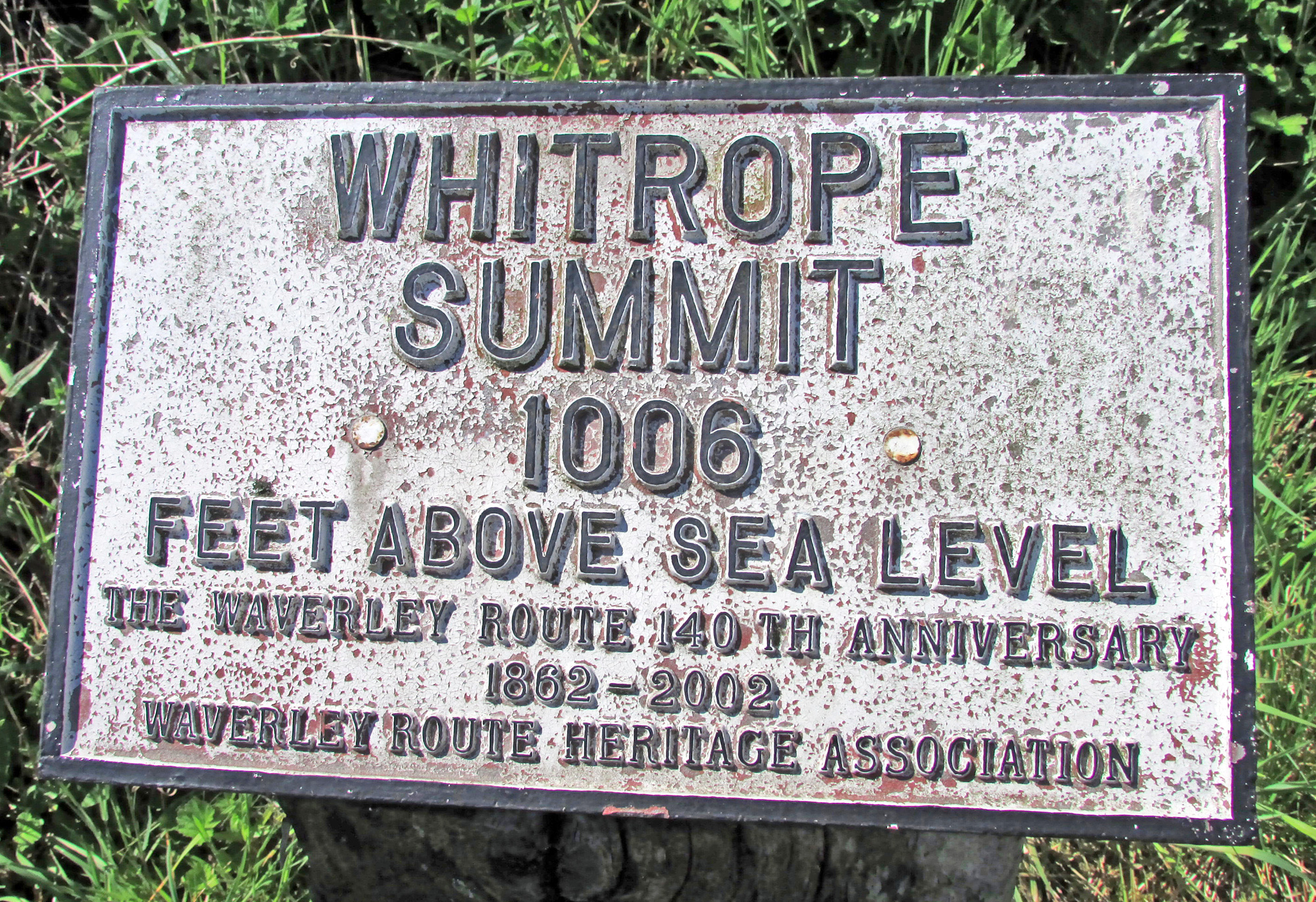
Memorial sign to mark the siding's location and height and the 140th anniversary of the route's opening

Waverley Route Heritage Association maintains a small museum of old Waverley Route related artefacts and photographs within a static carriage (Mk2 BSO 9400) together with an adjoining buffet carriage (69316 from a 4BIG EMU).

As of 2025, there is now a platform on the "down" side with over 800 m (870 yd) of track laid from the tunnel over the summit southward to Bridge 200. There is a plan to rebuild a replica of the old Whitrope Signal Box, as well as to extend the running line southwards to the former site of Riccarton Junction. In 2005 a survey was carried out on Whitrope Tunnel to determine if a northern extension through it towards Shankend would be possible.

As well as the two static carriages mentioned above, there are also two locomotives on site; the WRHA's own shunter 0-6-0 DM JF 4240015 of 1962 which arrived on 9 December 2009, and 4w DM Ruston—a 48DS on loan from Rocks by Rail and arrived on 14 June 2011.

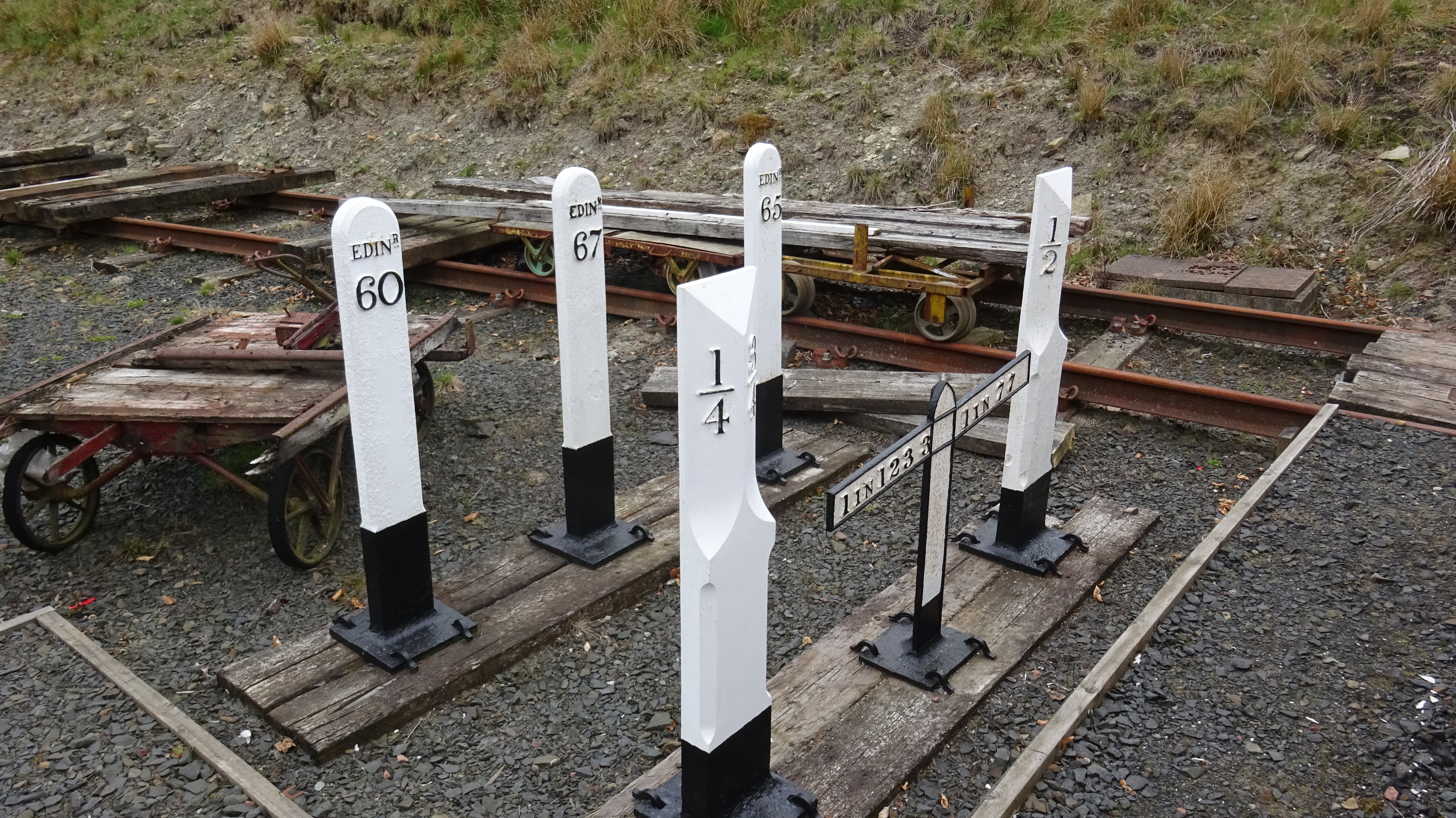
display of mileposts

On 16 April 2012 another item of rolling stock arrived; Mk2f RFO 1215 on loan from Northumbria Rail. It was planned that this would be joined by Mk2f BSO 9538 (also from Northumbria Rail) and these carriage were intended to form a short rake for passenger trains later in the year.

On 31 May 2012 BRE / Leyland railbus RB004 on loan from Northumbria Rail, was unloaded at the site having been moved up by road from the Midland Railway – Butterley in Derbyshire the day before. Early in 2020 it was announced that this was shortly expected to be joined by two production British Rail Class 142 Pacer units, 142019 and 142020, latterly in service with Northern.

| Preceding station | Heritage railways | Following station |
Proposed railways
| Terminus | Border Union Railway | Riccarton Junction Terminus |

== See also ==
- Whitrope Tunnel
- List of places in the Scottish Borders
- List of places in Scotland
