= Newcastleton railway station =

Disused railway station in Newcastleton, Scottish Borders

Newcastleton
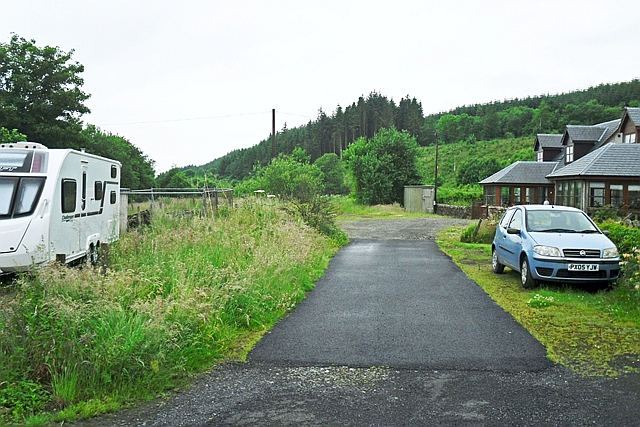
- The site of the station in 2017

General information
- Location: Newcastleton, Scottish Borders; Scotland
- Coordinates: 55.1806°N 2.8157°W
- Grid reference: NY481876
- Platforms: 2

Other information
- Status: Disused

History
- Original company: Border Union Railway
- Pre-grouping: North British Railway
- Post-grouping: LNER; British Rail (Scottish Region)

Key dates
- 1 March 1862: Opened
- 6 January 1969: Closed
Location

Newcastleton railway station served the village of Newcastleton, Scottish Borders, Scotland from 1862 to 1969 on the Border Union Railway.

== History ==
The station was opened on 1 March 1862 by the Border Union Railway. It was situated on the north side of the level crossing on Langholm Street. The goods yard was on the up side of the station and consisted of five sidings, all of which were loops, with a fifth short siding end-on to the large loading dock, where a goods shed made of stone was. The yard had a large quantity of timber traffic and, in the Second World War, two diesel locomotives were delivered to the Forestry Commission for light railway use in the area. The goods yard closed on 9 October 1967 and the station closed along with the line on 6 January 1969.

Preceding station	Disused railways	Following station
Steele Road; Line and station closed	North British Railway; Border Union Railway	Kershope Foot; Line and station closed
