= Waverley Route Heritage Association =

Heritage railway line in Scotland

Coordinates: 55.2934°N 2.7487°W

Border Union Railway Company
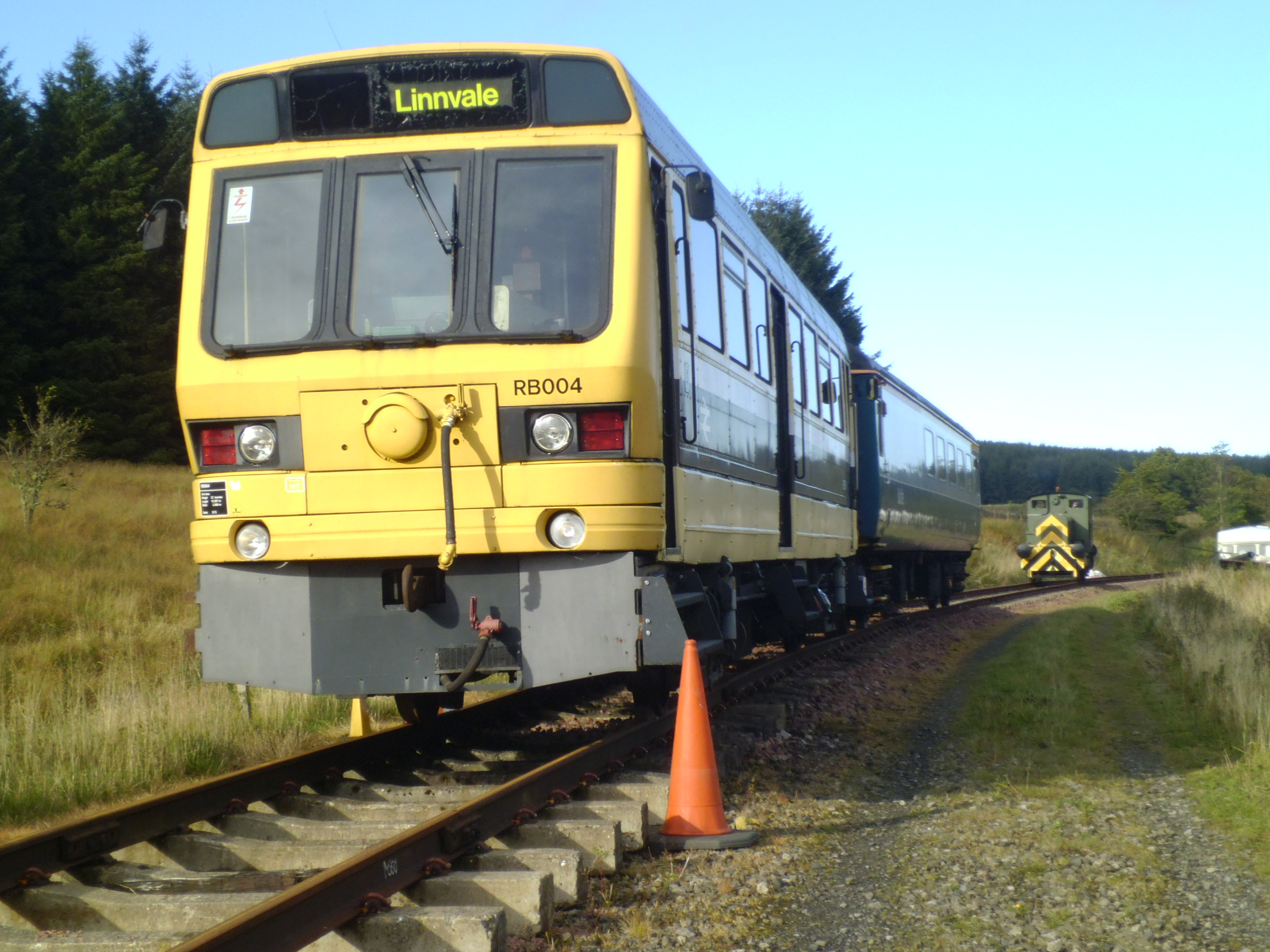
- Railbus 004 & MkII Buffet First Coach; Waverley Route, 30 September 2012

Commercial operations
- Name: Waverley Route
- Built by: North British Railway
- Original gauge: 4 ft 8 1/2 in (1,435 mm)

Preserved operations
- Preserved gauge: 4 ft 8 1/2 in (1,435 mm)
- Preserved era: Association formed 10 November 2001
- 1 July 2012: First train ran

Waverley Route Heritage Association is a heritage railway group involved with the history, heritage and preservation of the Waverley Route, based/centred on Whitrope, south of Hawick, Scotland.

Current projects include the restoration of the 1,208 yard Whitrope Tunnel, formerly part of the Border Union Railway. Also under restoration is Whitrope Siding, which is the headquarters of the line and the home of WRHA's Whitrope Heritage Centre.

The Association operates a train service along a mile of former Waverley Route track from Whitrope Tunnel to Bridge 200. The association's other aims include restoring most of the track south of Whitrope to Riccarton Junction. The WRHA have been negotiating a new lease with the Forestry Commission.

== Border Union Railway Company ==
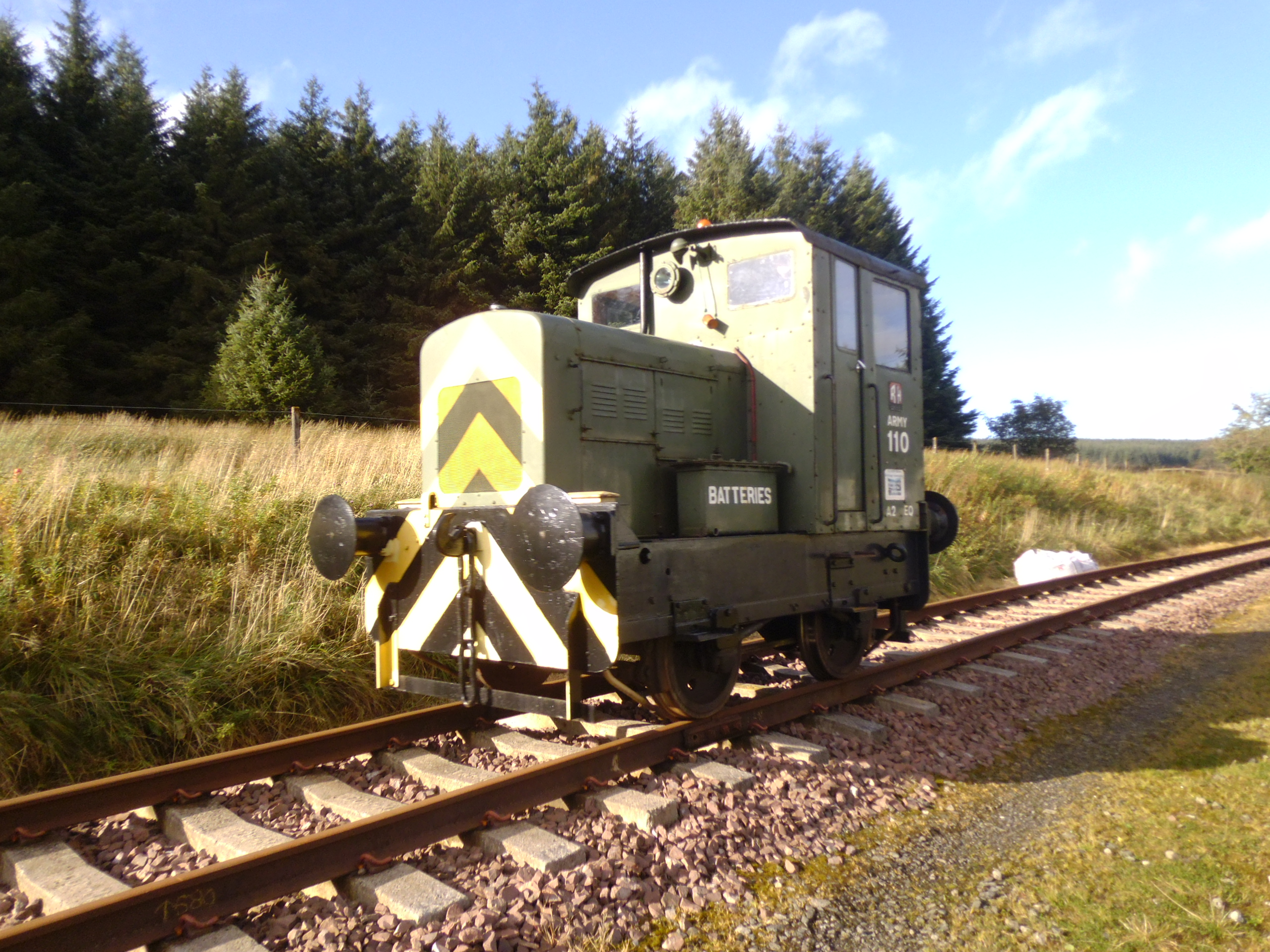
Ruston & Hornsby shunter, Waverley Route, 30 September 2012

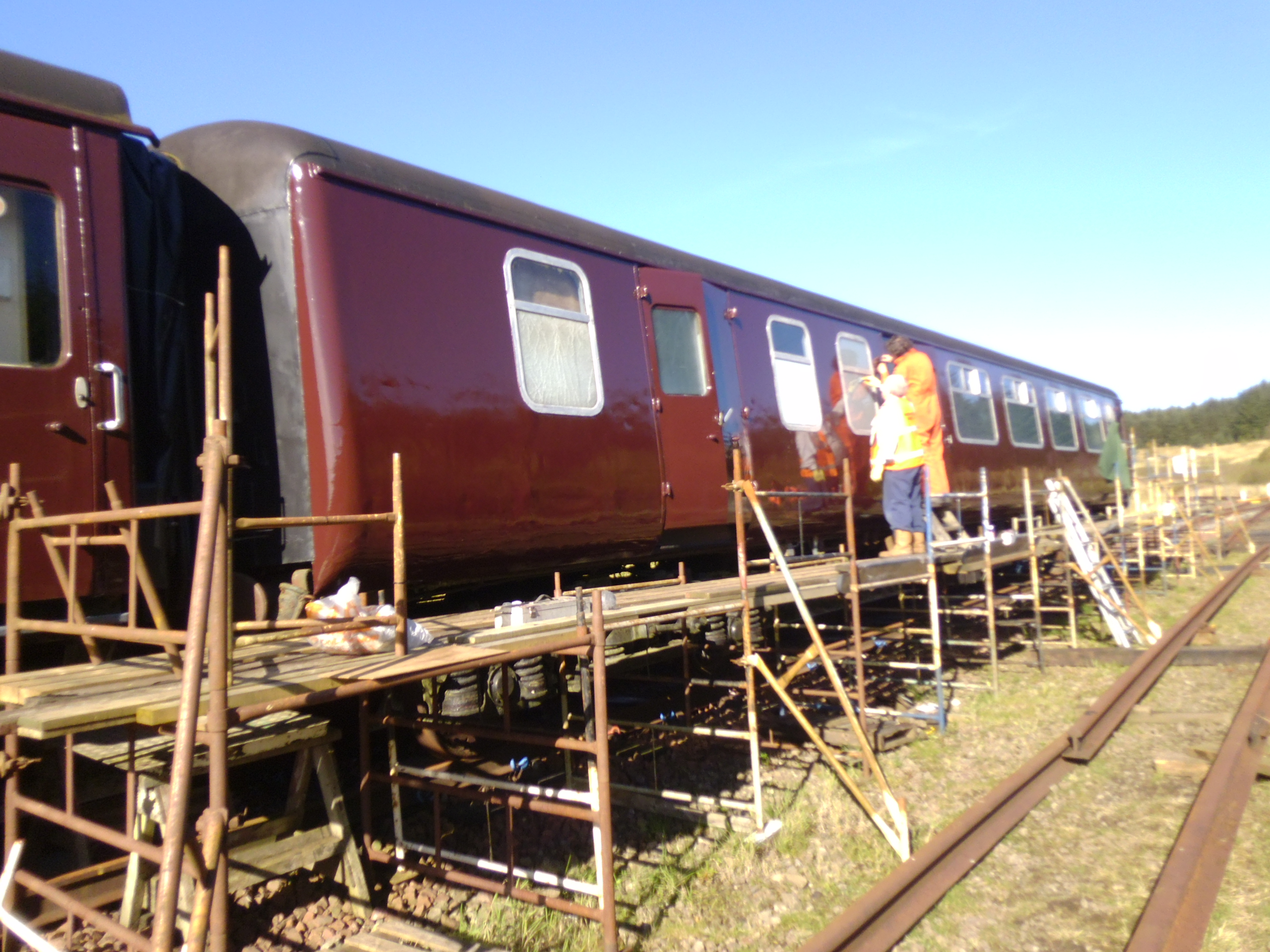
Brake 2nd open coach 9400, Waverley Route, 7 October 2012

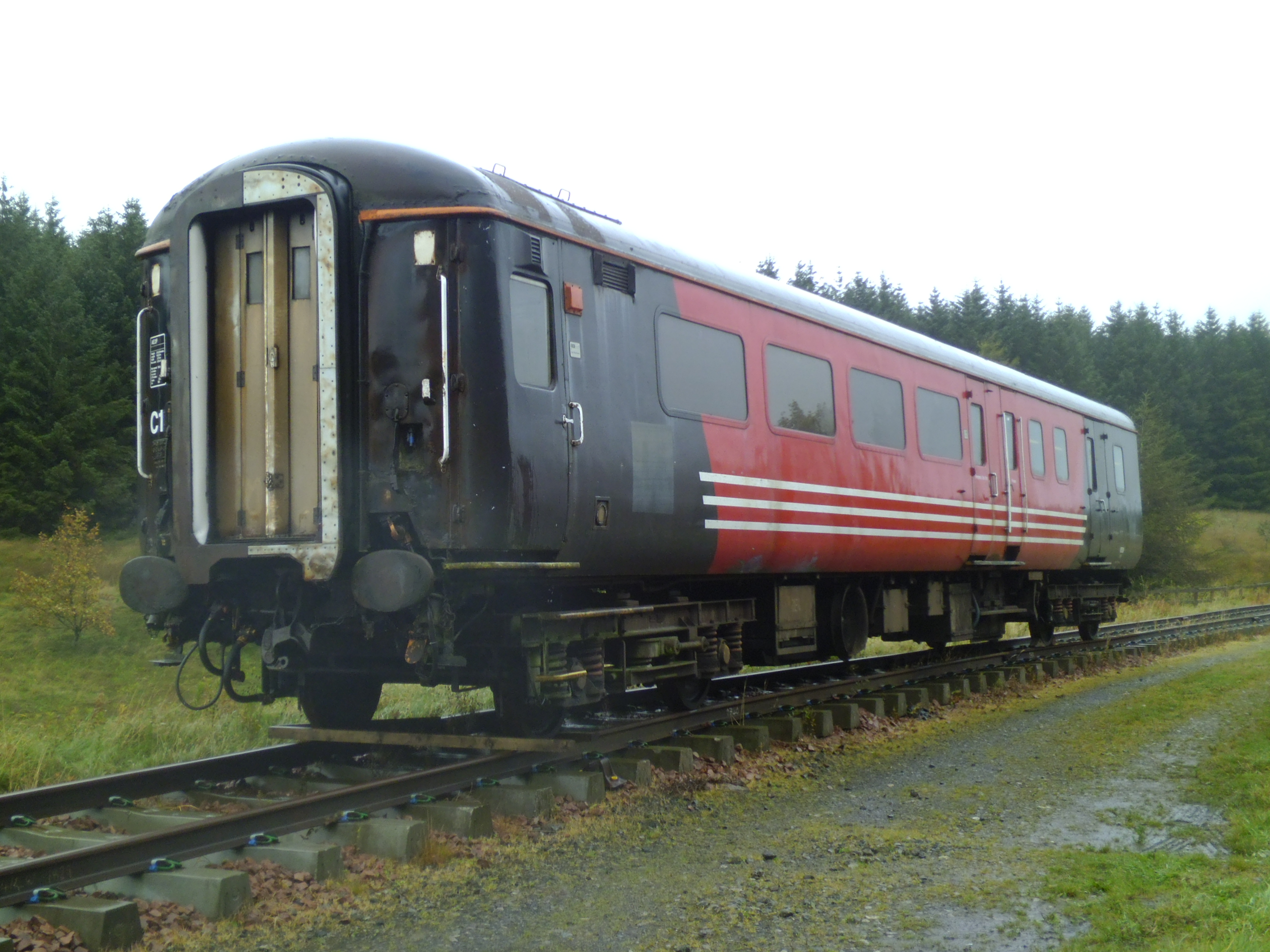
Brake 2nd coach 9538, Waverley Route, 30 September 2012

The Border Union Railway Company is a wholly owned subsidiary of the WRHA, which runs trains on a section of demonstration track north and south from Whitrope Heritage Centre.

=== Motive power ===
Diesel locomotives and railcar

Description	Number	Year built	Notes
Ruston & Hornsby 48DS	411319	1958	Returned to home railway
British Rail Class 142	142019	1985	Undergoing repaint, slow progress
British Rail Class 142	142020	1985	In service

=== Rolling stock ===
Passenger coaches

Description	Number	Year built	Notes
BR Mk1 TSRB	69316	1965	Static buffet car
BR Mk2 BSO	9400	1966	Static exhibition carriage
BR Mk2 BSO	9538	1974	Stored serviceable

Goods wagons

Description	Number	Year built	Notes
LMS 13 ton 5 plank wagon	419057	1945	Being restored

== Borders Railway ==
The northern part of the Waverley Route has been re-opened as the Borders Railway which is part of the National Rail network.
