= Waverley Route =

Partially open railway line serving Edinburgh, Midlothian and Scottish Borders

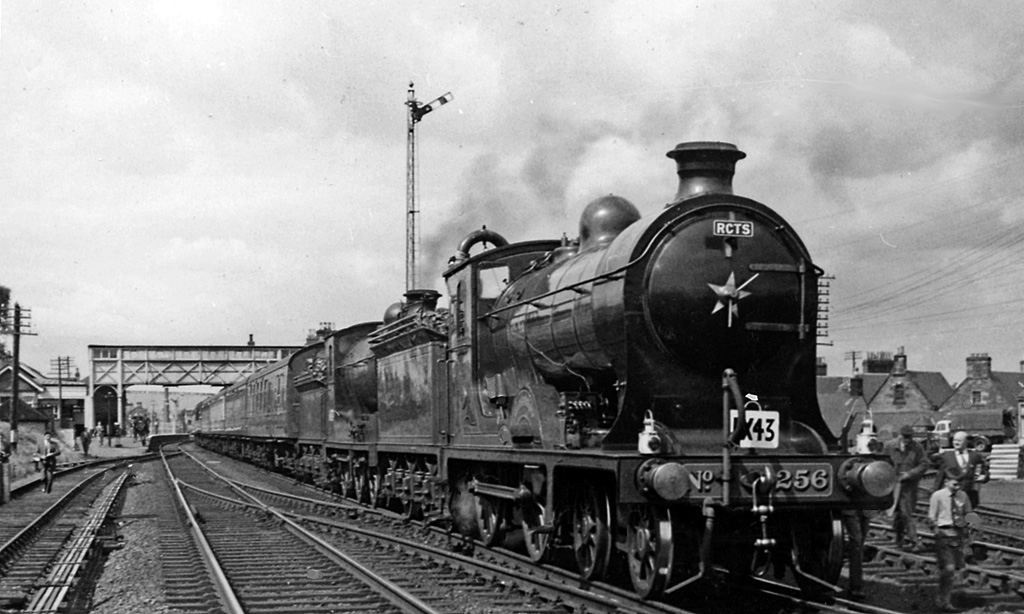
- NBR K Class No. 256 Glen Douglas at St Boswells in 1961

Overview
- Status: Partially open
- Locale: Edinburgh, Midlothian, Borders, Carlisle; Great Britain
- Termini: Edinburgh Waverley; Carlisle Citadel

Service
- Type: Heavy rail
- System: National Rail

History
- Opened: 1849, 2015
- Closed: 1969

Technical
- Line length: 98 1/4 mi (158.1 km)
- Track gauge: 4 ft 8 1/2 in (1,435 mm)
Route map
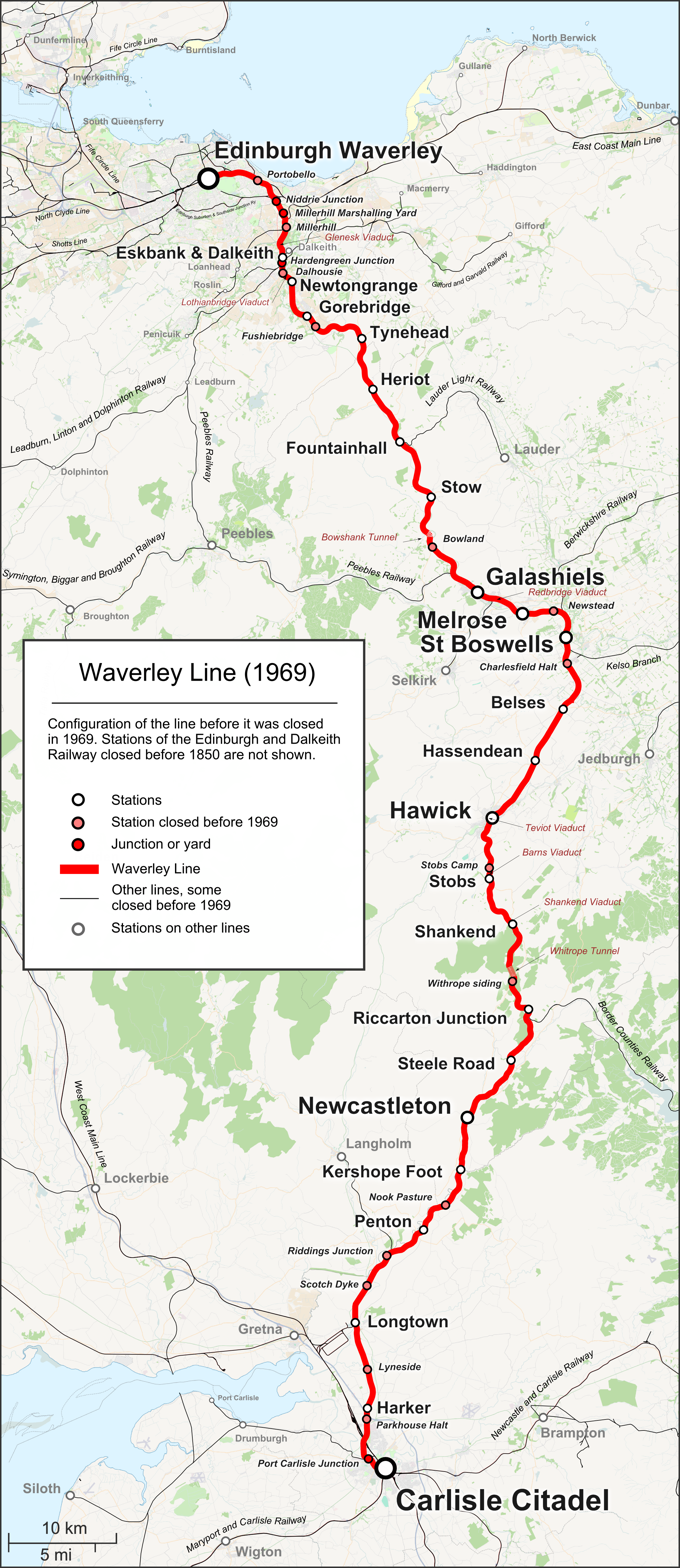

The Waverley Route was a railway line that ran south from Edinburgh, through Midlothian and the Scottish Borders, to Carlisle. The line was built by the North British Railway; the stretch from Edinburgh to Hawick opened in 1849 and the remainder to Carlisle opened in 1862. The line was nicknamed after the immensely popular Waverley Novels, written by Sir Walter Scott.

The line was closed in 1969, as a result of the Beeching Report. Part of the line, from Edinburgh to Tweedbank, reopened in September 2015. The reopened railway is known as the Borders Railway.

== History ==
=== Origins ===
==== Edinburgh and Dalkeith Railway ====
The North British Railway (NBR) was established on 4 July 1844 when the North British Railway Act 1844 (7 & 8 Vict. c. lxvi) was passed giving authorisation for the construction of a 57-mile-30-chain (92.3 km) line from Edinburgh to Berwick-upon-Tweed with a 4-mile-50-chain (7.4 km) branch to Haddington. The company's chairman and founder was John Learmonth, the chairman of the Edinburgh and Glasgow Railway, whose ambition it was to enclose the triangle of land between Edinburgh, Berwick and Carlisle with NBR rails. Carlisle was a key railway centre where a cross-border link with the Lancaster and Carlisle Railway could be established.

The NBR's Edinburgh-Berwick line was to be the starting point for the route which would run diagonally across the Southern Uplands to the Solway Plain and Carlisle, a distance of some 98 miles (158 km). The first step in establishing the line was the acquisition of the Edinburgh and Dalkeith Railway (E&DR), a local line opened in 1831 which ran from an inconveniently sited station at St Leonards on the southern extremity of Edinburgh to Dalhousie on the Lothian Coalfield. The E&DR, which had been authorised on 26 May 1826 as a tramway to carry coal to the Firth of Forth at Fisherrow and, later, Leith, ran for a distance of 8 1/2 miles (13.7 km) with branches eastwards to Leith and Fisherrow from Wanton Walls. The proprietors of the E&DR viewed the NBR's overtures with some alarm as they feared the loss of their valuable coal traffic; thought was given to extending the E&DR to meet the Edinburgh and Glasgow or the projected Caledonian Main Line but the proprietors' concerns were assuaged by the NBR's generous offer of £113,000 for the outright purchase of the line and the sale was completed in October 1845.

In the state in which it was acquired, the E&DR was of little use to the NBR as it had been operated as a horse-drawn tramway for the previous thirteen years, was built to a 4 ft 6 in gauge and was in a dilapidated state in terms of both infrastructure and rolling stock. Nevertheless, the concern brought with it a number of advantages: its proprietors had developed an efficient coal-marketing organisation which would greatly benefit its new owners, it consolidated the NBR's position in Edinburgh while also barring the rival Caledonian Railway from the Lothian Coalfields, and, perhaps most importantly, the E&DR pointed in the direction of Carlisle. Authorisation for the line's acquisition was obtained on 21 July 1845 with the passing of the North British Railway (Edinburgh and Dalkeith Purchase) Act 1845 (8 & 9 Vict. c. lxxxii), which allowed the NBR to lay a spur from its Edinburgh-Berwick line near Portobello to the E&DR at Niddrie, thereby allowing NBR services to run directly from North Bridge station to Dalhousie.

==== Edinburgh and Hawick Railway ====
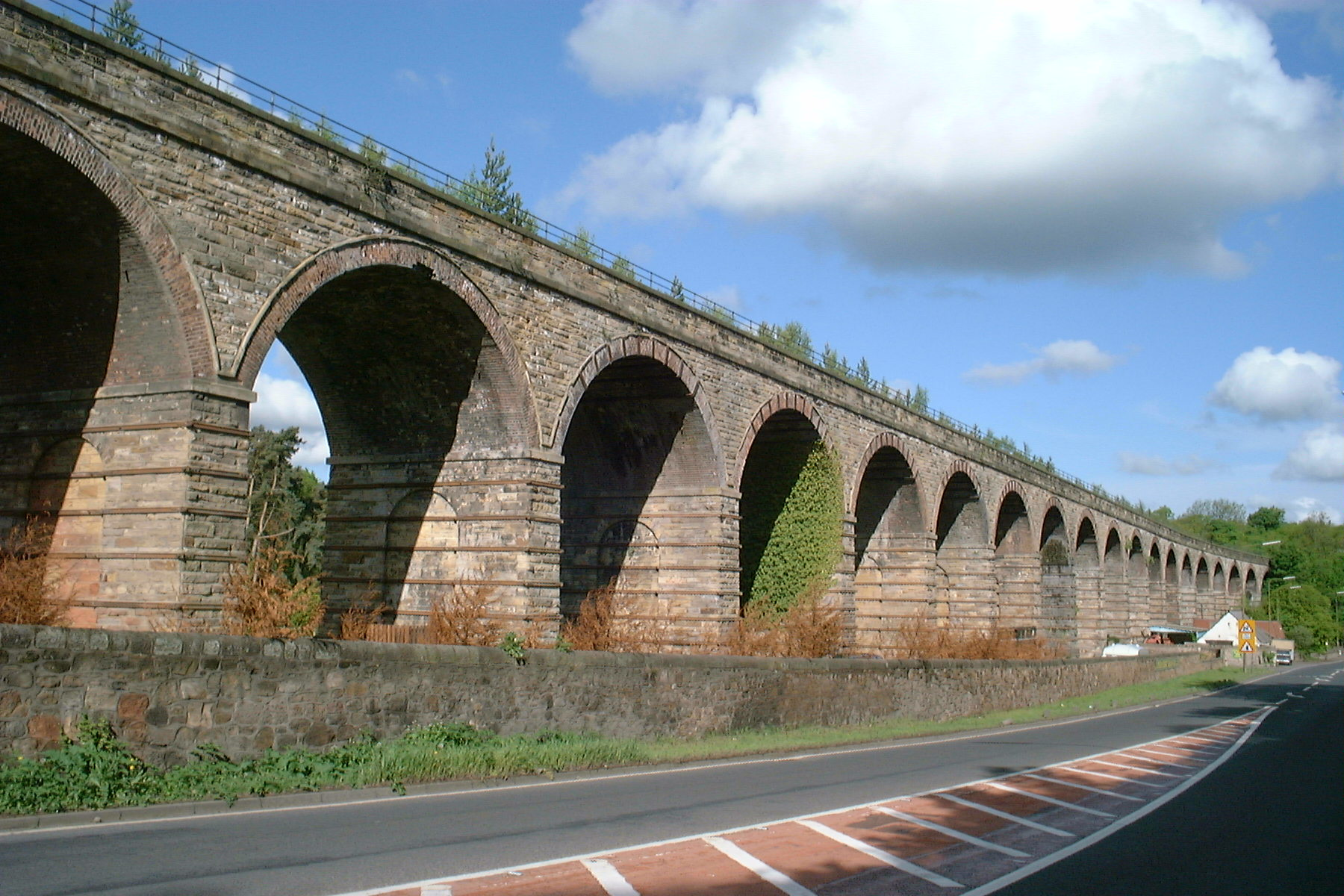
Newbattle Viaduct over the South Esk near Newtongrange in 2000; the viaduct was later renovated and a single track relaid over it as part of the Borders Railway project

Even before the NBR had obtained its North British Railway (Edinburgh and Dalkeith Purchase) Act 1845 authorising the acquisition of the E&DR, John Learmonth had instructed John Miller to carry out a flying survey of the territory to the south of Dalkeith for a potential line to Kelso which would connect with a branch from Berwick. The scheme, which would see a 52-mile (84 km) line from the E&DR's terminus at Dalhousie Mains to Hawick, was discussed at a shareholders' meeting on 19 December 1844 where it drew criticism for being nearly as long as the NBR's Berwick line. Learmonth described the line as a "protective" one to guard against incursions by the NBR's Glasgow-based rival, the Caledonian Railway, and stated that there was no intention of extending it further to Carlisle. The proposal having been carried by a substantial majority, the Edinburgh and Hawick Railway Act 1845 (8 & 9 Vict. c. clxiii) authorising the line was obtained on 21 July 1845 with the incorporation of the Edinburgh and Hawick Railway. Although nominally independent, the company had £400,000 of its capital subscribed by NBR directors and the shares, each bearing a 4% guarantee, were to be transferred to NBR shareholders after incorporation. A special shareholders' meeting on 18 August 1845 authorised a further £400,000 to be raised which would be used to buy out the Edinburgh and Hawick company. At the same time, Learmonth revealed that it was in fact intended to continue to Carlisle.

The line would first be extended to Galashiels by paying £1,200 to buy out the independent Galashiels Railway project. The line to Hawick was to be the greatest and most costly of the NBR's lines. From Dalhousie it climbed up the valleys of the South Esk and the Gore Water for 8 miles (13 km) at 1 in 70 to reach a 900-foot (270 m) summit at Falahill, before dropping down to the Gala Water which it crossed fifteen times to reach Galashiels. The next stage passed through the Tweed Valley, around the Eildons to Melrose and St Boswells, and finally to Hawick over undulating terrain. Construction was already under way in June 1846 when the company obtained authorisation to build seven branch lines – four from its Berwick line and three from the Hawick line. The line opened on 1 November 1849.

==== Border Union Railway ====
Despite the manifest lack of traffic potential over the barren moorlands separating Hawick and Carlisle, reaching the Cumbrian county town was to be a hotly disputed affair with the NBR and the Caledonian Railway vying for control. The Caledonian was keen to hinder the progress of the NBR and planned an incursion into NBR territory with the Caledonian Extension Railway – a 104-mile (167 km) line from Ayr to Berwick to complement its main line from Carlisle to Glasgow. In 1847, the Caledonian obtained powers to construct a line eastwards from Gretna on its main line to Canonbie, only 8 miles (13 km) from Hawick, but these powers were allowed to lapse. A second scheme was promoted in 1857: a single-line branch to Langholm whose sole aim was to keep the NBR out of Carlisle. The NBR put forward a rival scheme: the 43-mile (69 km) long double-track Border Union Railway which would run from Hawick down Liddesdale and through Newcastleton to the Solway Plain and Carlisle. The extension being a matter of life and death for the NBR, its chairman, Richard Hodgson, who had replaced Learmonth in 1855, set about appealing to local councils and traders for their support. Through his efforts, the Border Union Railway was backed by the town councils of Edinburgh, Leith, Dunbar, Haddington, Berwick and Hawick, whilst the Leith Dock Commissioners, the Merchant Company of Edinburgh and the Edinburgh Chamber of Commerce also supported the scheme. The Border towns saw the Glasgow-based Caledonian Railway as an interloper, whereas the NBR was an Edinburgh company and their chairman was from the Borders region. Such was the support for Hodgson that a public holiday was declared in his honour at Hawick in August 1858.

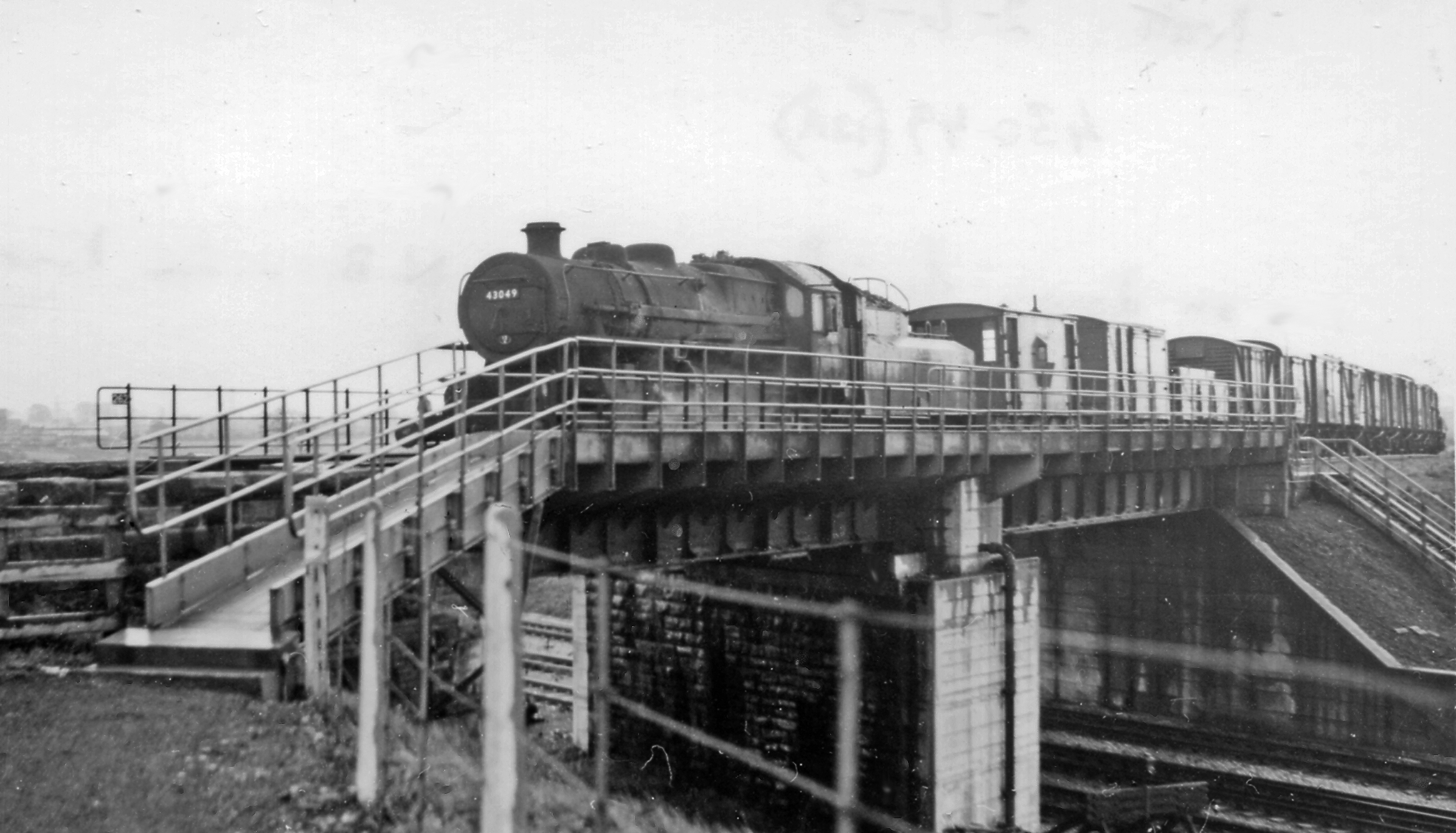
LMS Ivatt 4MT No. 43049 crossing the West Coast Main Line at Kingmoor near Carlisle with a goods train in 1965

Notwithstanding this support, Hodgson sought to build bridges with the Caledonian by offering, on 4 September 1858, to construct a joint line between Hawick and Carlisle. The line would be built in two equal parts by the companies which would be responsible for its management; free interchange of traffic would be allowed on the NBR lines north and west of Hawick and on the lines south and west of the Caledonian main line. The proposal gained no traction with the Caledonian, leading the NBR to publish details of its proposed scheme, to be known as the Border Union Railway, on 17 December 1858. The line would cost £450,000, of which £337,500 would be raised by shares and the remainder by a loan. Authorisation was given on 21 July 1859 when the Border Union (North British) Railways Act 1859 (22 & 23 Vict. c. xxiv) provided for the construction of a 43-mile (69 km) long line to Carlisle. The main line opened throughout to passengers on 1 July 1862. A celebration was held on 1 August when a special train ran from Edinburgh and a dinner was held in the carriage shed at Carlisle for around 700 guests. The Waverley Route was not however complete until the final section on the branch from Canonbie to Langholm opened on 18 April 1864 after completion of a 12-arch viaduct over Tarras Water.

Comprised within the Border Union (North British) Railways Act 1859 were powers allowing the NBR to cross the Caledonian Railway's main line and join the Carlisle and Silloth Bay Railway at Rattlingate, as well as the granting of facilities at Carlisle Citadel railway station. The NBR would take a 999-year lease of the Silloth line from 1 August 1862. This brought two advantages: firstly, the NBR had access to Carlisle and Silloth harbour with access to Ireland and Liverpool and, secondly, it allowed freight to be sent by sea without having to work through Carlisle and thus not be subject to the Anglo-Scottish traffic agreement which set the rates for goods workings via Carlisle.

=== Topography and construction ===
At 98 1/4 miles (158.1 km), the alignment chosen for the Waverley Route was considerably longer than the direct route as the crow flies between Edinburgh and Carlisle, around 74 miles (119 km). However, the course was chosen to navigate a careful path around the formidable natural barriers south of Edinburgh in the form of the Southern Uplands and the summits at Whitrope (1,006 feet or 307 metres) and Falahill (880 feet or 270 metres). Although advantage was taken of the easy conditions offered by the numerous river valleys, these two areas of high ground had to be tackled head-on, and gave rise to the line's reputation as the toughest main line in Britain due to its constant curves and continuous steep gradients. The climb to Whitrope was more challenging than that to the summit of the West Coast line at Beattock due to its curvature.

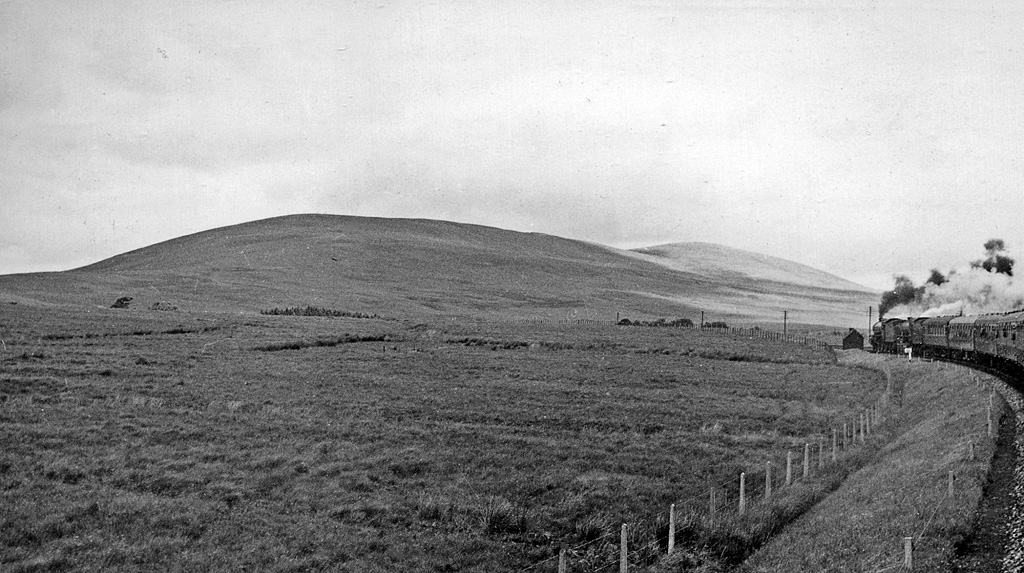
View at the head of Liddesdale from a train approaching Riccarton Junction

From Edinburgh Waverley, the line proceeded south via Portobello East Junction towards the Moorfoots and the Lammermuirs, following the valleys of the South Esk, Gore Water and the Tyne. From Hardengreen Junction near Dalkeith there began a 10-mile (16 km) climb at a gradient of 1 in 70 to reach Falahill, before meandering along the course of the Gala Water down to its confluence with the River Tweed, which accompanied the line for a few miles eastwards to Melrose and St Boswells, descending at typically 1 in 150. The route swung to the south-west at St Boswells towards the River Teviot and on to Hawick, where the valley of Slitrig Water provided easy going before the 10-mile (16 km) climb at 1 in 70 over the massed hills to Whitrope Summit. The gradient subsequently eased to 1 in 96 through Whitrope Tunnel to Whitrope Siding box and descended at an unbroken 1 in 75 for over 8 miles (13 km) through the curves necessitated by the rugged countryside around Arnton Fell towards Riccarton Junction and Steele Road. Then came easier terrain in the form of Liddel Water, where the line turned west to follow Liddesdale and the Esk valley to reach the border at Kershope Burn. The final stretch from Riddings struck out across the coastal plain to Longtown and then Carlisle.

The first sod on the Border Union Railway was turned at Hawick on 22 July 1859, a day after the line had received Parliamentary approval. Construction works were to last two years and ten months; the task was made all the more difficult by the Caledonian Railway's delaying tactics in Parliament, which meant that the main works could only begin as winter was approaching. The heavy construction work took place in difficult weather – three frightful winters and two wet summers – in desolate country miles from public roads, which required teams of horses to bring materials across the moors and hillsides to the remote work sites. Life on the moorland was hard for the railway navvies and it was difficult to hire and keep men in the very wet conditions which at times prevented any progress. When the NBR's directors toured the Hawick-Hermitage section in January 1862, a number of defects were found, including a collapsed wall at the north end of Teviot viaduct due to shoddy specifications, a succession of landslips which required the directors to proceed in a ballast wagon, and a stark lack of progress at Stobs. On two of the construction contracts, the NBR's chief engineer had to take over from the contractors, whose equipment was sequestrated and sold.

By September 1861, the southern section of the line was ready for traffic; but none could be carried, as the Caledonian Railway had failed to lay the connection with its newly constructed Port Carlisle branch at Port Carlisle Junction. This was grudgingly done after a request by the NBR, but the single line laid was rejected by the Board of Trade, which insisted on a double-track connection. When the connection was finally laid and access obtained to Carlisle Citadel station, the Caledonian charged the rate for 4 miles (6.4 km) for the 1 1/2-mile (2.4 km) approach, and refused to accept NBR telegraph wires on its branch, or NBR passholders, who were dropped off at Port Carlisle Junction. The Border Union Railway was opened in sections: freight services were introduced between Carlisle and Scotch Dyke on 12 October 1861 followed by the passenger service on 28 October; this service was extended to Newcastleton on 1 March 1862 and to Riccarton Junction on 2 June. Opening throughout came on 1 July 1862.

=== Naming and branches ===
The Waverley Route between England and Scotland, The Waverley is the most interesting and attractive, and is the only Route which enables the Tourist to visit Melrose (for Melrose Abbey and Abbotsford) and St Boswells (for Dryburgh Abbey)

— North British Railway advertisement, Black's Where Shall We Go (1877)

The name "Waverley Route" first appeared in NBR minute books towards the end of 1862, and headed the first timetable of Hawick-Carlisle services. Although we have no idea how or by whom it was chosen, it was inspired by the Waverley Novels of Sir Walter Scott, who lived at Abbotsford House near the route of the line and had taken an active interest in early railways. Scott's portrait often adorned posters and timetables and the Scott Monument in Edinburgh became the route's leitmotif. The first class of locomotive specially built for the line, Drummond's 4-4-0 of 1876, was known as the "Abbotsford Class"; No. 479 bore the name, so closely associated with Scott.

On the same day that the Carlisle extension was opened, services also began on the Border Counties Railway. It branched off the Waverley Route at Riccarton Junction and ran south to join the Newcastle and Carlisle Railway at Hexham. This provided the NBR with a connection to Newcastle and the East Coast line over North Eastern Railway (NER) metals. The NER extracted a high price from the NBR in the form of running rights from Berwick-upon-Tweed to Edinburgh. These were fully exercised by the NER, thereby greatly reducing the influence of the Scottish company on the East Coast line.

The Waverley Route spawned a series of branches serving the towns and villages in the Scottish Borders: a branch line from Kelso Junction near St Boswells reached Kelso where it met an NER branch from Tweedmouth. The NBR chairman, Richard Hodgson, sought to link the Waverley Route with the Edinburgh-Berwick line between Ravenswood Junction, north of St Boswells, and Reston; the branch between Reston and Duns had been completed in 1849 and a western section to St Boswells was promoted as the Berwickshire Railway. It opened throughout on 2 October 1865. Other towns to be connected were Jedburgh by the independent Jedburgh Railway which was inaugurated on 17 July 1856 and worked by the NBR, and Selkirk via the Selkirk and Galashiels Railway, also opened in 1856 and operated by the NBR, while Langholm received a branch from Riddings Junction, and Gretna one from Longtown. One of the last branches to be constructed was the Lauder Light Railway in 1901; this replaced an omnibus subsidised by the NBR providing access from the town of Lauder, famed for its trout, and connecting with trains at Stow.

=== Early years ===
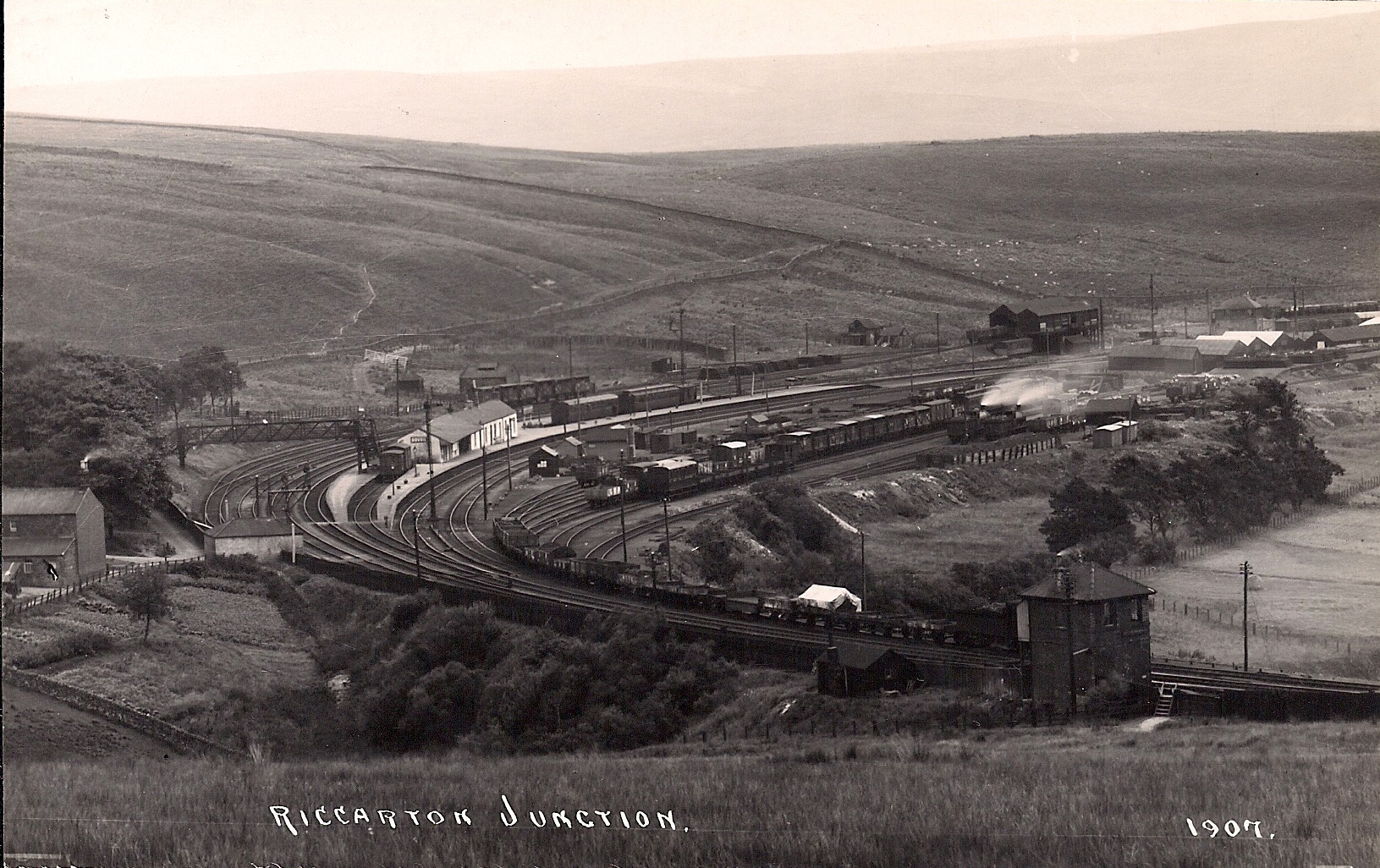
Riccarton Junction in the 1900s

The completion of the Border Union Railway was an unwelcome development for the West Coast partnership set up by the London and North Western Railway (L&NWR), the Lancaster and Carlisle Railway and the Caledonian Railway, which had dominated the joint station at Carlisle Citadel and the profitable Anglo-Scottish traffic which passed through it. By 1860, the traffic was generating more than £1,500,000 for the partnership; this represented more than two-thirds of its income. To protect their interests, the companies concluded a secret agreement to deny a share of the Carlisle traffic to the newcomer by providing that traffic from the south for Edinburgh had to be sent via the Caledonian main line unless specifically consigned to the NBR's Waverley line. This proved so effective that locomotive parts ordered by the NBR from the Midlands reached the company's St Margarets works in Edinburgh via the Caledonian. Nevertheless, the NBR did make some inroads into the partnership's traffic, and the Edinburgh-London goods traffic carried over the East Coast line declined from 4,045 tonnes in 1861 to 624 tonnes in 1863.

In the face of these difficulties, the initial results of the Waverley Route were disappointing; this led to heated discussions at NBR board meetings. A lobby developed, featuring in particular shareholders from Glasgow, which called for the line to be abandoned or sold to the Midland Railway. The campaign was led by Archibald Orr-Ewing, an NBR director who described the line as "the most serious burden on the North British". By 1872, expenditure on the Border Union Railway had reached £847,000, £199,000 more than the capital hitherto raised, and a further £300,000 was required. In addition, no shipping company was prepared to start a service to Ireland from Silloth, even though the port had assumed greater importance for the NBR as a result of the difficulties at Carlisle. As a result, although it had not been the NBR's intention to own ships, it became necessary to acquire the paddle steamers Ariel in 1862, followed by Queen and Silloth in 1864, in order to operate a passenger and goods service between Silloth and Liverpool, Dublin and Belfast.

The financial picture changed with the decision of the Midland Railway to construct the Settle-Carlisle Line. Intent on establishing an Anglo-Scottish main line to rival the East Coast and West Coast lines, the Midland's ambitions had been stymied by the L&NWR, upon which the Midland depended for access to Carlisle via the Ingleton branch. The L&NWR's insistence on operating the service between Ingleton and Low Gill as a rural branch line led the Midland in 1866 to apply for Parliamentary authorisation to construct its own line to Carlisle. However, in the wake of the Overend Gurney crisis and an offer by the L&NWR to grant running powers between Ingleton and Carlisle on reasonable conditions, the Midland began to have second thoughts, and requested the abandonment of its proposed scheme in 1869. Both the NBR and the Glasgow and South Western Railway petitioned against the abandonment on the basis that it would leave them dependent on the L&NWR's monopoly at Carlisle; they also resented the fact that they had been used by the Midland as a means to negotiate terms with the L&NWR. The House of Commons Committee hearing the case for the bill took the same view, and the Midland was obliged to proceed with construction of the Settle-Carlisle line.

A through service between St Pancras and Edinburgh began on 1 May 1876 after new rails had been fitted to the Waverley Route at a cost of £23,957 in order to equip the line for Midland trains. The block telegraph was still being installed when the first through services traversed the line. Upon completion of the Midland's line, the Waverley Route attained main line status. The opening of the Forth Bridge in 1890 led to an increase in traffic carried over the Midland's line to stations north of Carlisle. Receipts in June, July, August and September of that year were £6,809 higher than in the corresponding months of the previous year.

=== Closure ===
==== Background ====
Throughout its lifetime, the Waverley Route only achieved moderate success. Even during its best years, returns from the line's intermediate stations were meagre. In 1920, the eleven stations between Stobs and Harker on the sparsely populated area between Hawick and Carlisle raised only £28,152 in receipts, with Longtown contributing the bulk of this amount. The line was challenging to work due to its severe gradients requiring costly double-heading, and difficult to maintain particularly in winter.

As a result, right from the first year of its existence, there were calls from within the NBR to close the line; it was considered a millstone by its successive operators. Too far east of the Scottish industrial heartland in the Clyde Valley, and traversing thinly-populated countryside for much of the way, the Waverley Route lived off cross-border passenger services and traffic generated by the wool textile industries in Galashiels, Selkirk and Hawick. As a passenger artery, the effectiveness of the route as a competitor to Edinburgh-London traffic was hampered by its slower journey times compared with the East Coast and West Coast lines, requiring the line's operators to compensate by laying on superior rolling stock. In 1910, the West Coast and East Coast lines achieved a journey time of eight hours and fifteen minutes over their respective distances of 400 miles (640 km) and 393 miles (632 km), whereas the Midland's expresses via the Waverley Route covered the 406 3/4 miles (654.6 km) in eight hours and forty minutes. Those who travelled on the line often did so because of the pleasant journey and scenic views north of Leeds, and holiday workings were timed to allow passengers to take in the landscape during daylight hours. In terms of passenger numbers, a reasonable load was carried from Edinburgh to Leeds and Sheffield, but beyond there, patronage was lighter. A survey conducted in July 1963 on a peak Saturday Edinburgh-London service showed that fewer than 40 passengers were carried between Kettering and St Pancras, although the train had been standing room only as far as Leeds. Local services fared little better, as motor transport made inroads from the 1920s onwards, resulting in the successive closures to passenger traffic of the Waverley Route's branch lines: Lauder on 12 September 1932, Dolphinton on 1 April 1933, Duns to Earlston and Jedburgh on 12 August 1948, Duns and Selkirk on 10 September 1951, Hexham on 15 October 1956 and Peebles and Eyemouth on 5 February 1962.

After railway nationalisation in 1948, the need for two lines between Edinburgh and Carlisle was inevitably questioned. The Caledonian's main line provided a faster connection, and could be operated as a branch off the West Coast line. With passenger receipts inconsequential, the line relied on its goods traffic: coal was brought in and out of the Tweed town mills and Cheviot wool brought from local farms. Once new road transport techniques allowed farmers to move their sheep to market in one move and merchants to shift coal from pit to boilerhouse without using the railway, an impending sense of doom could be felt for the line.

==== Proposal tabled ====
In March 1963, the British Railways Board published Richard Beeching's report on the Reshaping of British Railways. The 148-page document proposed the withdrawal of passenger services from 5,000 route miles (8,000 km) considered as unremunerative, and the closure of over 2,000 stations. Among the lines whose passenger service would be affected was the Waverley Route. The document had a map which showed that the section between Hawick and Carlisle fell into the lowest category of unremunerative line, with a weekly patronage of less than 5,000 passengers. The Hawick-Edinburgh stretch fared little better, with between 5,000 and 10,000 passengers a week. At the time, the Waverley Route was running at an estimated annual loss of £113,000, with an average operating cost per train mile for diesel-hauled freights of 12.390 shillings, one of the worst in Scotland. For British Railways, the line was seen as a high-cost alternative to the West Coast Main Line, and its retention could not be justified by its dwindling freight traffic which could be diverted to the West Coast. As a result, as from the publication of the report, the Scottish Region and the London Midland Regions of British Railways, which had responsibility for the section south of Longtown, both assumed that the line would definitely close, as proposed by Beeching.

The Beeching report was received with dismay in the Borders, as although many were not surprised to see the Langholm branch slated for closure, the loss of the whole Waverley line came as a shock, particularly as even more rural-based routes such as the West Highland Line were not mentioned in the document. The economic and social implications of the proposed closure were of concern to a number of government ministries, including the Scottish Office which, in April 1964, requested the Minister of Transport to ask Beeching to postpone publication of closure notices for the Waverley Route. The Scottish Economic Planning Council also asked the minister to hold fire on any proposals, due to the nature, size and importance of the region served by the line. In the 1964 general election, the Unionist Party Member of Parliament for Roxburgh, Selkirk and Peebles, Charles Donaldson, whose constituency covered Hawick and who had voted for the Beeching report, saw his majority cut by the Liberal candidate, David Steel, who had opposed closure of the railway line. Steel overturned the Conservative majority in a 1965 by-election; his opposition to the route's closure was one of the three main local issues of his campaign.

The election of Labour in October 1964 did not stop the programme of Beeching closures, despite the party's manifesto commitment to halt major closures. It was still intended to close the Waverley Route, although the timing of the proposal was a matter of debate between the new Minister of Transport, Barbara Castle, and the Secretary of State for Scotland, Willie Ross, who was acutely aware of the sensitivity of the closure proposal for the Borders region and for wider Scottish economic development. The proposal for the closure of the entire line and its 24 stations was finally issued on 17 August 1966; it said closure would happen on 2 January 1967 if no objections were received; replacement bus services were to be provided by Eastern Scottish. British Rail estimated that a net saving of £232,000 would be made from closure. 508 objections to closure were lodged with the Transport Users' Consultative Committee (TUCC) in Edinburgh within the allotted six-week period, and a public hearing was held in Hawick on 16 and 17 November 1966. Representatives from the county councils of Berwickshire, Roxburghshire and Selkirkshire and the town councils of Galashiels, Jedburgh, Innerleithen, Hawick, Kelso, Selkirk and Peebles attended the meeting to fight the case against closure. There were no representatives from English councils; only Northumberland had contacted the TUCC requesting to be informed of the outcome. Arguments made against closure included the inadequacies of local roads and the damage which would be caused to the fabric of Borders life, whilst British Rail pointed to the falling patronage of the line and the increased car ownership in the area. The TUCC's 15-page report was submitted to Barbara Castle in December 1966, but it was only in April 1968 that she concluded that the annual subsidy required for the line's retention – £700,000 for the whole route or £390,000 for Hawick-Edinburgh – could not be justified. Even to run a reduced service between Edinburgh and Hawick, on a single track with most stations closed and with the most stringent economies, a grant of about £250,000 per year would be required, representing 11d per passenger mile. In the Minister's opinion, grants on such a scale, even for a drastically modified and rationalised service, could not be justified on a value-for-money basis. In the meantime, British Rail's Network for Development plans published in May 1967 confirmed that the line was considered neither as a trunk route to be developed, nor as a rural branch line qualifying for subsidy on social grounds.

==== Final decision ====
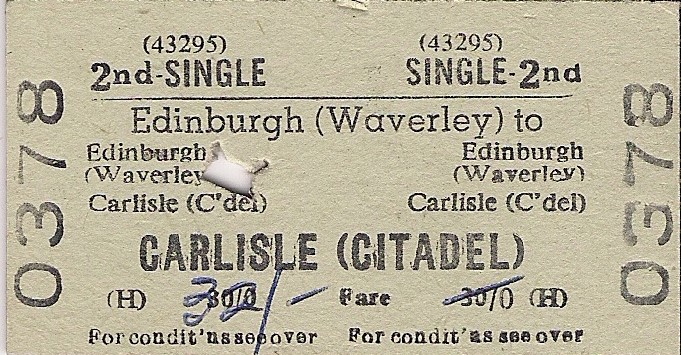
Edinburgh-Carlisle ticket in the last years of the line

Barbara Castle's intention to discontinue passenger services on the Waverley Route was opposed by Willie Ross and Anthony Crosland, President of the Board of Trade, who considered that it would call into question the government's intention to support the economic development of the Borders region and make a mockery of the consultative arrangements for the closure of railway lines by ignoring the findings of the TUCC and rejecting the recommendations of the Scottish Economic Planning Council. Castle was replaced by Richard Marsh in April 1968 after a Cabinet reshuffle. The new minister was unhappy to be moved from his previous position of Minister of Power to a ministry about which he "knew nothing and cared less". On 8 April 1968, two days after the reshuffle, the Ministerial Committee on Environmental Planning (MCEP) met to hear the arguments for and against closure of the line; Marsh referred to statistics which showed that passenger numbers between Edinburgh and Hawick had dipped by 30% between 1964 and 1967, while car ownership had risen by 120% and the local population had decreased by 9.5%. In reply, those on the side of retention argued that closure of the line at a time when government policy was to encourage industry to move to the Borders area would send the wrong message and asked the minister not to reach a final decision until publication of a report by a group of University of Edinburgh consultants, James Wreford Watson, Percy Johnson-Marshall and James Nathan Wolfe, on the development of the Borders region. The report – The Central Borders: A Plan for Expansion – was delivered to Willie Ross on 19 April and, while concluding that the economic well-being of the region depended on good transport links with Edinburgh, it was nevertheless equivocal on the need for the Waverley Route and its recommendations concerned road transport rather than rail.

The Waverley Route's fate was decided at a meeting of the MCEP on 21 May chaired by Peter Shore, Secretary of State for Economic Affairs, and attended by Willie Ross, Marsh, Tom Urwin, Ray Gunter, Dick Taverne and Ernest Fernyhough. Two supporters of the line – Antony Crosland and Lord Brown of Machrihanish – were absent. After hearing arguments on both sides, Shore summarised the committee's opinion in favour of closure throughout "as quickly as possible", noting that the effect on the movement of freight traffic would be minimal and that inconvenience for some passengers was an inevitable consequence of any closure. Following the meeting, Ross escalated the matter to the Prime Minister, Harold Wilson, begging him "to look at the cumulative consequences of our course of action on our standing in Scotland". Marsh countered with a memorandum which stated that closure would affect "only about 200 regular travellers [...], of whom all but 30 would be adequately catered for by alternative bus services", and that the subsidy required to continue the passenger service would run into more than several million pounds per year. He was supported by Peter Shore, who sent a separate memorandum referring to the Central Borders study and its lack of support for the line. The Prime Minister replied to Ross on 5 June indicating that he saw no reason to reopen the MCEP's decision. An official statement by Richard Marsh in the House of Commons on 15 July 1968 confirmed the Waverley Route's demise. A petition against closure, with 11,678 signatures presented to the Prime Minister in December 1968 by a Hawick housewife, Madge Elliot, accompanied by David Steel and the Earl of Dalkeith, MP for Edinburgh North, was to no avail. The line closed on Monday 6 January 1969, one of 37 lines closed by Marsh during his 18-month term of office. It was the largest railway closure in the United Kingdom until the closure of the Great Central Main Line a few months later.

The demise of the Waverley Route contrasts with the outcome of the proposal to close the Llanelli-Craven Arms line which was considered in Summer 1969. In both cases, patronage had declined and closure would result in a large area left without rail transport. However, the decisive difference which ensured the survival of the Welsh line was the number of marginal Labour constituencies through which it ran, a fact exploited to great effect by George Thomas, Secretary of State for Wales, in his successful defence of the line.

==== Last trains ====
Saturday 4 January 1969 was the last busy day of operations on the line; British Rail ran a special train entitled Farewell to the Waverley Route hauled by Class 47 D1974 and carrying 411 passengers in nine coaches. The train, which rail campaigners had urged supporters to boycott, was stopped at Millerhill shortly after leaving Edinburgh while four policemen and three bomb-disposal experts boarded it. An anonymous telephone call had been made to the police that a bomb was on board, but nothing was found. Arriving late in Hawick, the train was met by hundreds of placard-bearing protestors and large numbers of policemen. The crowds were led by a group carrying a black coffin bearing a wreath and the words "Waverley Line, Born 1848, Killed 1969". Madge Elliot, who had spearheaded the campaign to save the line, was warned by police not carry out her plan to hold a sit-in with protestors on the permanent way, and instead she distributed leaflets edged with the words "It's quicker by hearse". Meanwhile, the last freight trains to traverse the line came through: the 8:30 am Carlisle-Millerhill (4S42) and the 9:55 am Bathgate-Kings Norton empty car flats (3M45), which were respectively hauled by Type 3 and 4 diesels. The day also saw a second special – an 11-coach train from Newcastle worked by Deltic D9002 The King's Own Yorkshire Light Infantry, and the last through goods services. The last southbound stopping service from Hawick left at 11:58 pm for Newcastleton.

Sunday morning saw the last northbound train to traverse the Carlisle-Hawick section, a service from Leeds chartered by the Railway Correspondence and Travel Society and hauled by Deltic D9007 Pinza The train called at Riccarton Junction for a photographic stop but passengers in search of souvenirs came away disappointed as buildings had been entirely stripped as the station had been reduced to an unstaffed halt. Upon departure, D9007 stalled on the rising 1 in 68 climb and it was discovered that a section of track had been thickly coated with grease.

The final passenger train was the evening sleeper train which departed Edinburgh Waverley for St Pancras at 9:56 pm with Class 45 D60 Lytham St Anne's. The service, which comprised three sleeping cars, three ordinary coaches and a full-length parcels/brake, arrived two hours late into Carlisle due to anti-closure protesters. Trouble had started at Hawick where a set of points had been tampered with and Class 17 D8606 was sent out in front as a pilot engine. A large crowd jammed the platform and a procession headed by a piper carried a coffin, labelled "British Rail", to the guard's van. The train was delayed for half an hour as the communication cord was pulled repeatedly. Reaching Newcastleton, the train stopped short of the platform as the signals were at red; D8606 had continued to the far end of the platform where the level crossing gates were closed across the line. These had been padlocked by some of the 200 villagers who crowded on to the line. Although the chains were removed by police, the crowd stood fast and prevented the gates from being opened. The police were hopelessly outnumbered and called for reinforcements from Hawick. The local parish minister, the Reverend Brydon Mabon, was arrested and taken to Newcastleton police station. The intervention of David Steel MP, who had joined the train at Galashiels, was required and he addressed the crowd which agreed to move if the Reverend Mabon was released. This was agreed to and the train could continue; Carlisle was eventually reached some two hours later than scheduled.

Freight services to Hawick continued until 25 April 1969, while the Longtown-Harker section survived until August 1970 to service the Ministry of Defence munitions depot. The last section to close was the line from Millerhill junction to the National Coal Board's Butlerfield washery south of Newtongrange in June 1972. The line to Millerhill junction remained open to serve the marshalling yard and diesel depot at Millerhill, as well as to give access to the freight-only Edinburgh South Suburban lines. Two days after closure, on Wednesday 8 January, British Rail symbolically lifted a section of track at Riddings Junction in the presence of reporters and photographers.

==== Aftermath ====
An attempt to reopen part of the line by the Border Union Railway Company (BUR), a private concern in which Tomorrow's World presenter Bob Symes was involved, failed due to lack of finance. British Rail had been asking for between £745,000 and £960,000 for the freehold of the line, £125,000 annually for running powers into Edinburgh and Carlisle, £85,000 for works in Carlisle, £10,000 towards their administrative costs and £495,000 for the value of the permanent way materials. A deposit of £250,000 had to be paid by 1 December 1969. Although the British Railways Board was interested and generally supportive, the Scottish Region was uninterested, unhelpful and obstructive. Access for BUR officers to the line was made difficult and Scottish Region staff were dismantling equipment even as negotiations progressed. An amount of £75,000 per year was demanded to connect with the main line at Portobello. A lower price was asked of the section between Riddings and Carlisle – £100,000 for the track and £68,000 for the land – but the sale would come with the obligation to ensure that 200 miles (320 km) of fencing be kept sheep-proof. The BUR decided that the Melrose to Edinburgh section offered scope for regular commuter traffic and chose Melrose as its headquarters. Things began to go wrong in 1970 when a number of potential backers pulled out and the 1970 general election saw the appointment of a new Minister of Transport, John Peyton, who was unable or unwilling to understand the BUR's plans. British Rail subsequently demanded a retainer rent on the land whilst the discussions continued, but the BUR declined on the basis that it would be cheaper to buy the land later and relay rather than pay the purchase price plus rent. British Rail thus began track-lifting and selling parcels of land, including much of the Galashiels site which went for housing. The BUR sought to obtain a more accommodating approach from the Minister but he refused. At the end of 1970, the BUR reluctantly abandoned the project and was wound up.

Tracklifting was complete by late 1972. Negotiations for the sale of parts of the railway solum had already begun, despite a request by Lord Melgund for it to be safeguarded. Lothian Regional Council was offered the section between Millerhill and the southern Midlothian boundary for £7,000 in May 1975 but refused on account of the limited possibilities for reuse of the trackbed and the potential maintenance liability involved. The short viaduct over the Teviot in Hawick was dismantled in September 1975, with Hawick station itself becoming the site of the Teviotdale Leisure Centre, and the A7 road was realigned on parts of the solum, notably north of Heriot, by 1977. Redevelopment of the trackbed accelerated after 1984 with the construction of a small housing estate near the site of Gorebridge station, the Melrose bypass in 1988 over much of the trackbed through Melrose station, as well as further A7 improvements including the Dalkeith western bypass and the Hardengreen bypass in 2000. In 1986, the Tarras and Byreburn viaducts on the Langholm branch were demolished.

Cut off from Edinburgh to the north and Carlisle to the south, those without a car had no option but to travel by bus. The additional bus services laid on by Eastern Scottish as a condition of closure were more frequent than the Waverley Route's trains, but the journey time was 50% longer. The Galashiels-Edinburgh X95 service took 75 minutes in 2006 to travel the distance, this journey time increasing to 86 minutes northbound in 2010 and May 2011 as a result of timetable changes. This compares unfavourably with the last Waverley Route timetable in 1968–1969, according to which the slowest train took 65 minutes over the same distance, whereas the fastest managed the journey in 42 minutes.

== Infrastructure and services ==
=== Passenger services ===
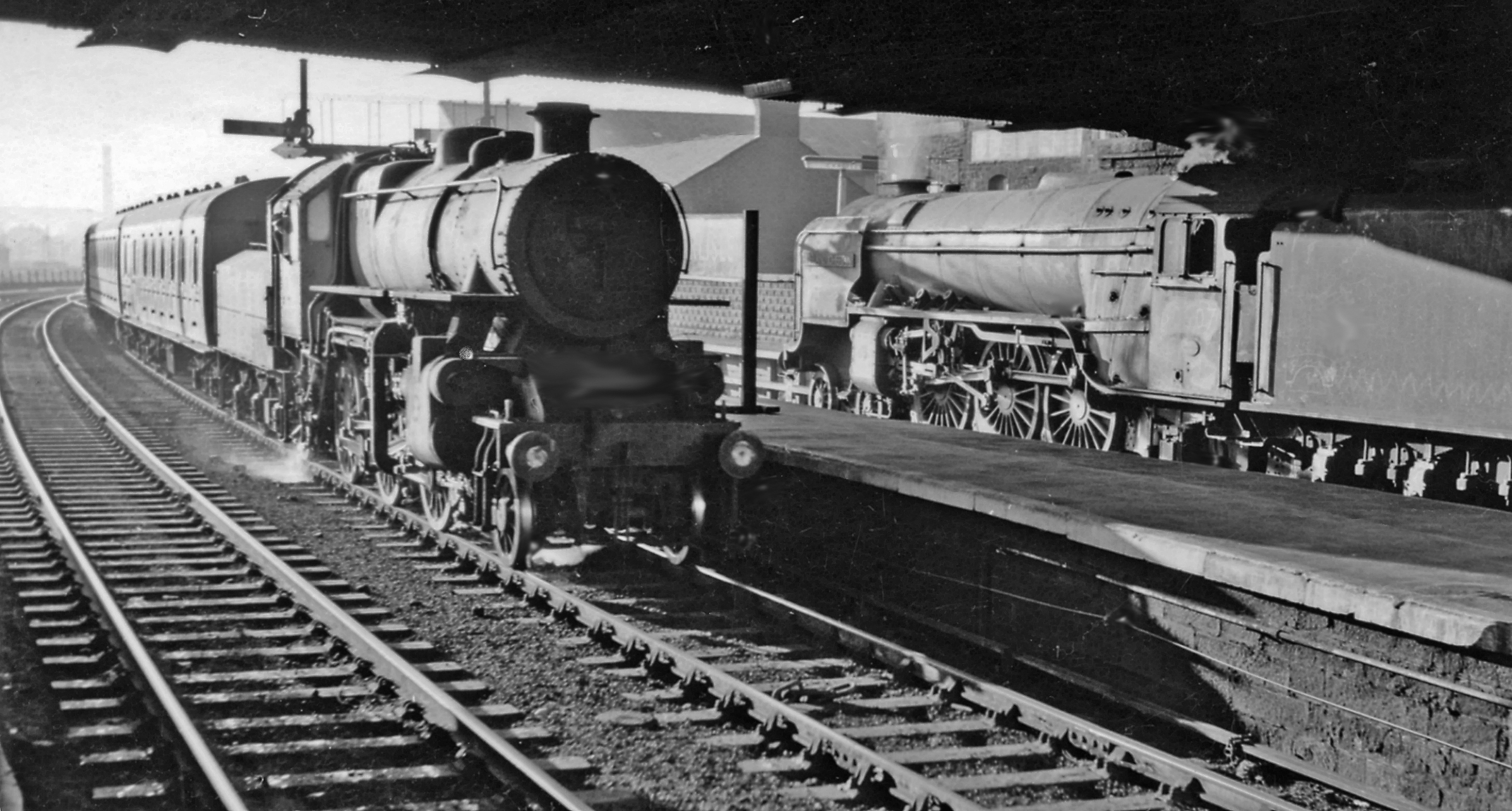
LNER Thompson Class A2/1 Pacific No. 60507 Highland Chieftain at Carlisle in 1960

The initial service between Edinburgh and Carlisle consisted of four trains each way daily: an express, a fast, a local and a Parliamentary. Journey times were 3 hours and 3 minutes for the express and fast trains, and 4 hours and 36 minutes for the local and parliamentary services. There were no through services; the express and fast trains connected with services from England at Carlisle. Passengers departing Edinburgh at 9:45 am would arrive at London Euston at 9:50 pm, while an afternoon service connected with the overnight southbound West Coast express. Two stopping services each way were provided on Sundays. When the Midland opened its Settle-Carlisle line, a weekday service of six trains was provided; trains departed St Pancras at midnight, 5:15 am, 8:30 am, 10:30 am, 11:30 am and 9:15 pm. Two services were expresses, two were semi-fasts and two which linked smaller intermediate stations with larger ones. However, services were beset by delays and poor timekeeping. During July 1880, the three daily St Pancras-Edinburgh expresses lost between them 2,345 minutes, of which 835 were the fault of the NBR; in the opposite direction, 2,565 minutes were lost with 1,099 on the NBR. The late running of trains led to complaints from passengers and traders would not use the line as the journey time was too long. As early as 1902, the Midland's services via the Waverley Route were poorly patronised north of Leeds, so much so that the NBR requested compensatory payments; between 1903 and 1907 the Midland's board approved payments totalling more than £5,000 in respect of the Edinburgh portion of the 1:30 pm St Pancras train.

By July 1914, the first departure from Edinburgh was a through service to Carlisle at 6:15 am. The service called at all of the line's 31 stations, including Abbeyhill, Piershill and Portobello, and took 275 minutes to traverse the 98 1/4 miles (158.1 km), with 16 minutes spent waiting at Galashiels, St Boswells and Hawick. The first arrival of the day in Carlisle via the Waverley Route was however a 6:00 am service from Hawick which arrived at 8:18 am after a 15-minute stand at Riccarton Junction to connect with the 6:40 am service to Newcastle. Three daily corridor restaurant car expresses ran to St Pancras, of which one had through coaches for Bristol. Carlisle was reached after a non-stop 131-minute run at an average speed of 45 miles per hour (72 km/h). A fast arrival in Carlisle was essential as the corridor coaches were allowed a maximum of 8¼ hours for the next 409 miles (658 km) to St Pancras. In total, there were nine through trains to Carlisle on weekdays (ten on Saturdays) including a 10:00 pm sleeper to St Pancras and a 10:15 pm night train to Euston; during the high summer season, an additional sleeper ran non-stop to Carlisle. A very similar service was provided in the opposite direction from Carlisle, with the fastest service being the 12:45 pm express from Carlisle which had departed St Pancras at 4:50 am and took 135 minutes for its non-stop run to Edinburgh. The sleepers ran on Sundays, a day on which there were otherwise no services on the line save for a morning and afternoon trains in both directions between Hawick and Edinburgh.

In 1927, the London, Midland and Scottish Railway (LMS) conferred the name "Thames-Forth Express" on the 9:05 am express from St Pancras and the 10:03 am train from Edinburgh; the journey time was around eight hours and forty minutes. The LMS did not provide a headboard but the London and North Eastern Railway, which jointly operated the service, used destination headboards in company style. The service was reintroduced in 1957 by British Railways which renamed it "The Waverley". The train was made up of nine coaches, all but one of which was Mark 1 stock, and took around nine hours and forty minutes to reach its destination. The service was discontinued in Summer 1964.

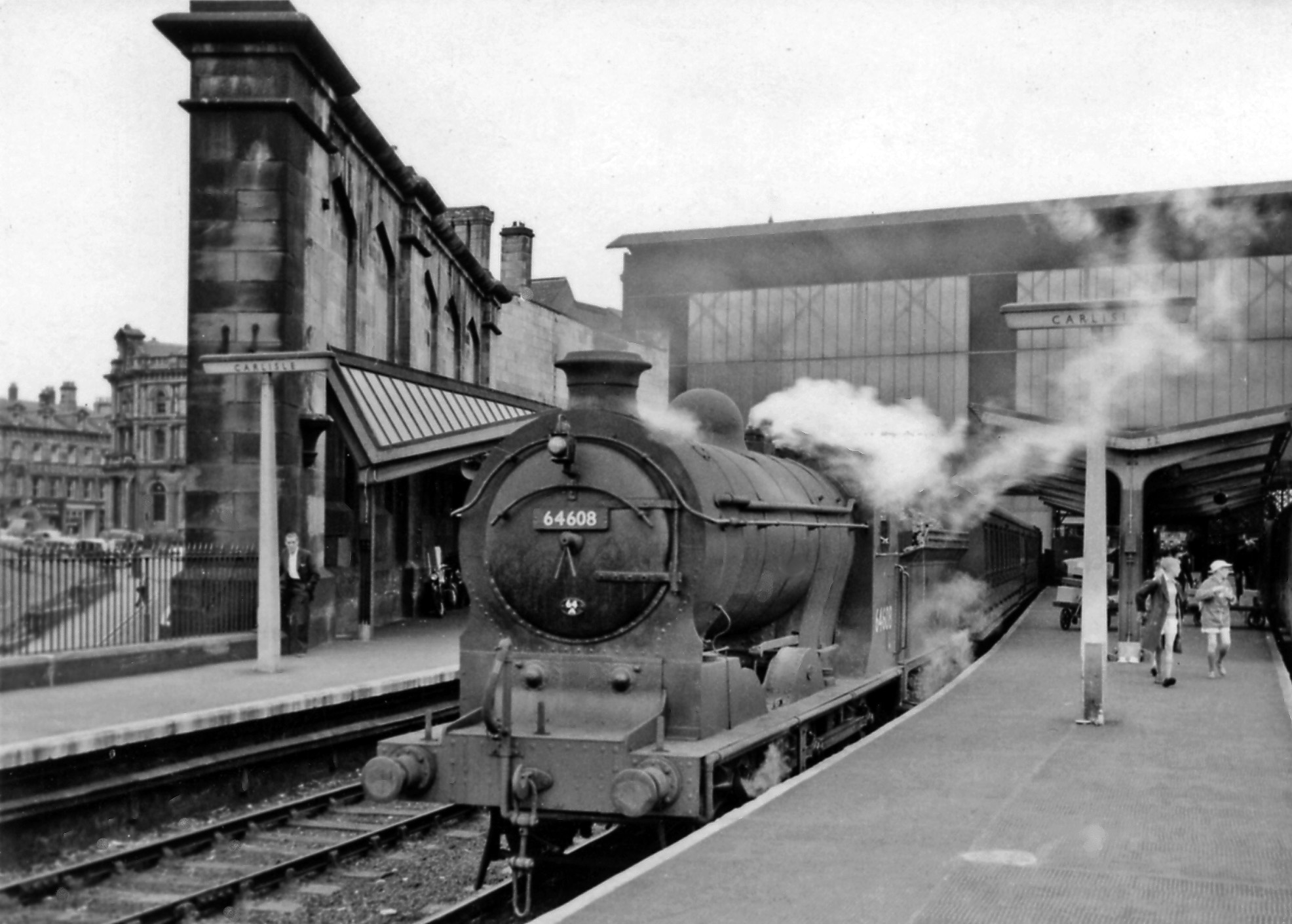
NBR S class No. 64608 with a stopping service to Hawick in 1960

Service levels declined substantially after the Second World War and a number of years were to pass before improvements were made. The timetable in June 1957 showed six through services between Edinburgh and Carlisle; by this time, six of the line's 31 intermediate stations had been closed and the Border Counties line had closed to be replaced by a bus service provided by Norman Fox. There was only one express service to London: the 10:05 am restaurant and trailer composite from Edinburgh-St Pancras which took 160 minutes to reach Carlisle. There was also a 9:45 pm sleeper service to St Pancras but this only carried passengers from stations south of Edinburgh and not Edinburgh itself. Hawick and Galashiels, which benefited from a good service in 1914, saw different outcomes: Hawick continued to enjoy a reasonably good service with six through services calling there as well as four trains to Edinburgh starting there. However, stations north of Hawick did not generally benefit as services to Edinburgh made few stops en route. The stations to the south of Hawick fared a little better as trains were extended to Riccarton Junction on Wednesdays and Saturdays. Just as in 1914, no Sunday stopping services ran south of Hawick; three trains ran from Edinburgh and two from Hawick, with journey times of between 85 and 103 minutes compared with 130–140 minutes in 1914. The improved times came however at the detriment of the smaller intermediate stations which had previously benefited from a more regular service.

The last timetable for the Waverley Route from 6 May 1968 showed one train each way to and from St Pancras, one to and from Carlisle with through coaches for St Pancras, three to and from Carlisle and two to and from Hawick, with two extra services on Saturday. The fastest service was the 4:44 am from Carlisle which arrived in Edinburgh at 7:12 am with stops at Newcastleton, Hawick, St Boswells, Melrose and Galashiels. The slowest service was the next train which departed Carlisle at 9:20 am and arrived in Edinburgh at 12:13 pm with stops at all 14 intermediate stations before Galashiels.

=== Goods traffic ===
Freight played a secondary role to passenger traffic for the majority of the Waverley Route's history. Located too far from the heavy industries of Central Scotland and the traffic in raw materials which they generated, it had to be content with a modest traffic in coal, wool and livestock. Goods traffic took on a new importance during the Second World War when the Waverley played a key role in moving personnel and supplies to the naval and military bases in Scotland. The amount of freight carried continued to rise after the war as passenger traffic tailed off with the route's downgrading, leaving ample capacity for the line to become a freight artery. This new role was aided by the construction of industrial plants closer to the route and the allocation to the line of the larger class of 2-10-0 locomotives, as well as the decisions taken by the Scottish Region of British Railways, firstly, to move fitted and semi-fitted freights from Carlisle for Aberdeen, Dundee and Perth over the Waverley Route, and secondly, to replace the old Niddrie and Portobello yards with a giant new marshalling yard alongside the line at Millerhill. The yard was in full operation by April 1963 and by November was handling an average of 21,000 wagons per week. However, although the yard flourished during its early years, changes in the national rail freight scene and the decline in the traditional Scottish industries resulted in it falling largely empty by the mid-1960s. A severe blow was dealt to Millerhill with the closure of the Waverley Route and by 1986 it was a mere a secondary marshalling point. The Down yard closed in 1983 and all the tracks were lifted except for two siding lines into Monktonhall Colliery; the colliery closed in 1989 before reopening briefly between 1993 and 1997 when final closure occurred and the lines were lifted.

=== Motive power and sheds ===
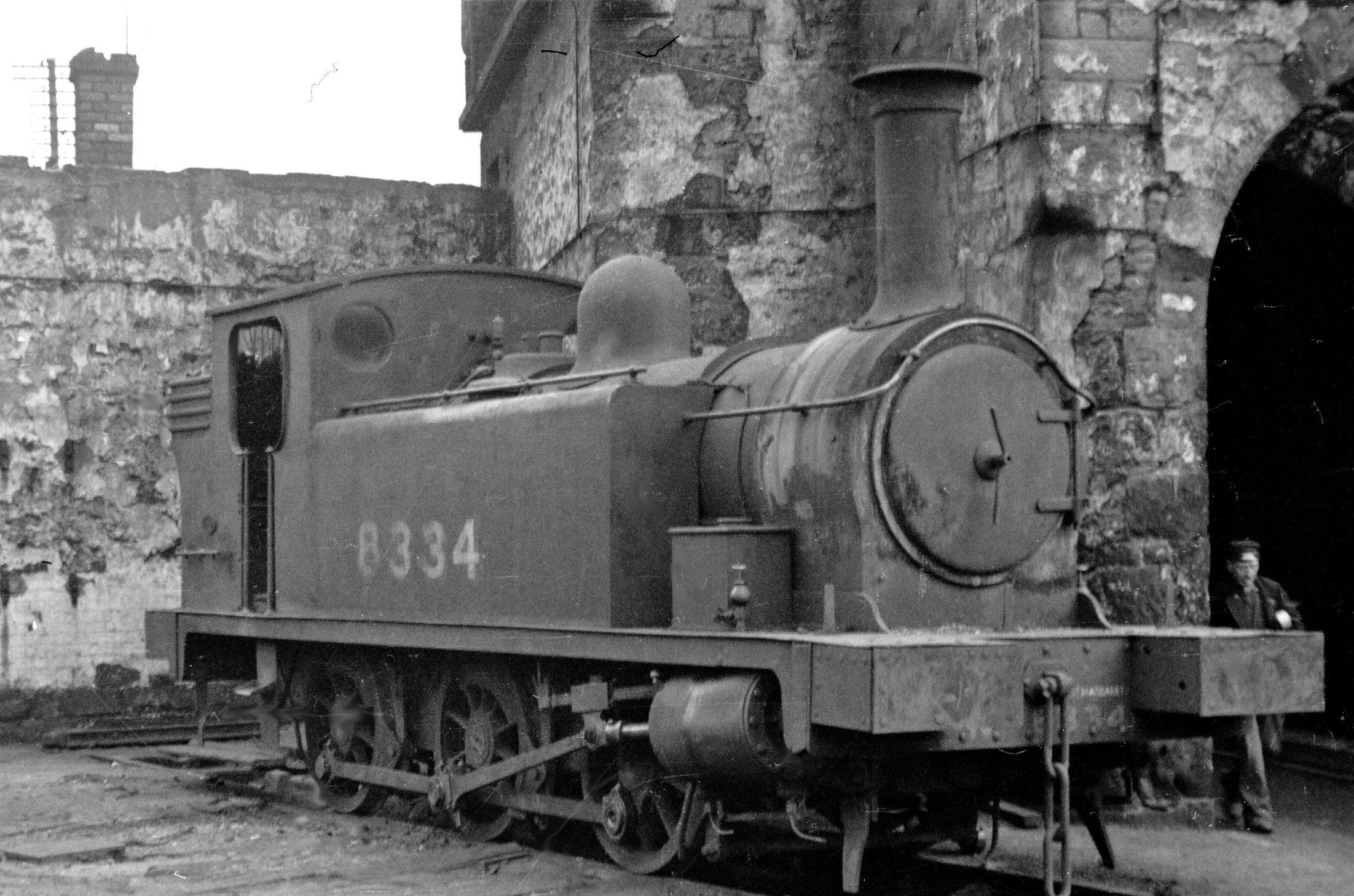
NBR F class No. 8334 at St Margarets Locomotive Depot in 1948

A large number of locomotive classes were used on the Waverley Route, many of which were not designed for the line. Among the earliest locomotives to be used on the line were Hawthorn double-framed 0-6-0 mineral engines ordered on 28 October 1845 whose principal task was to haul coal on the E&DR. Known as Dalkeith Coal engines, these were spartan machines without weather boards or sideboards to protect the crew against inclement conditions, although whistles were provided, one of which stood against the driver's ear. These were supplemented by eight Hawthorn passenger 2-4-0s in 1847 upon the opening of the Hawick extension. In 1873, Thomas Wheatley, the NBR's Locomotive Superintendent, introduced the 420 class. Four engines were built at Cowlairs railway works which were capable for handling light trains but inadequate for the heavier rolling stock used by the Midland Railway on its Anglo-Scottish expresses once the Settle-Carlisle line opened. A more capable locomotive was introduced in 1875 by Wheatley's successor Dugald Drummond whose 4-4-0 476 class was the largest and most powerful locomotive in Great Britain at the time, as well as one of the very few satisfactory four-coupled bogie express engines on the network on the 1870s. The new locomotives were known as the Abbotsford Class after no. 479 which bore that name.

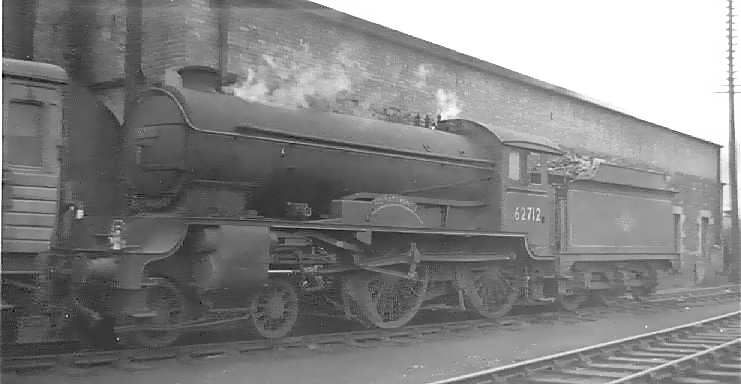
LNER Class D49 No. 62712 Morayshire at Hawick shed.

From 1907, most principal services were worked by the 4-4-2 Atlantics designed by William Reid and built by the North British Locomotive Company. The Atlantics were intended to put an end to costly double-heading on the Waverley Route but suffered from teething problems which endured nearly two years, after which the class proved to be excellent performers, particularly after they were superheated in 1915. The Atlantics are considered as the finest performing engines associated with the Waverley Route until the introduction in the late 1920s of Sir Nigel Gresley's A3 Pacifics. The first A3 to visit the line was No. 2580 Shotover on 26 February 1928. The Pacifics were at times supplemented by A4s and it was No. 4490 Empire of India which hauled the Royal Train in the early 1940s when George VI inspected the troops at Stobs Camp. In later years, B1s, V2s and Britannia Class locomotives worked Waverley Route trains, with the last steam-hauled service being Britannia No. 70022 Tornado on the 7:44 pm Carlisle-Edinburgh train on 14 November 1967. Diesels became important on the line from c. 1960, with the expresses worked by Class 45 and Class 46 Peaks and Class 47s and Deltics appearing on the farewell specials. Local trains were mainly worked by Class 26s supplemented by Class 25s and Class 37s, while freight services were hauled by a variety of classes including Clayton Class 17s.

The Waverley Route had a small number of minor engine sheds and two major sheds at its northern and southern extremities. The smaller sheds were at Galashiels, St Boswells, Riccarton Junction and Hardengreen Junction; Hawick had a larger facility which was important for the operation of the Waverley Route and its branch lines. St Margarets and Carlisle Canal were the major sheds; St Margarets had been the original NBR shed in the Edinburgh area and remained an important facility well into the 1960s. Although smaller than St Margarets, Carlisle Canal played a vital role in the operation of the Waverley Route and even with the line's decline post-nationalisation, there were still over 50 locomotives stabled there in the mid-1950s.

=== Major structures and earthworks ===
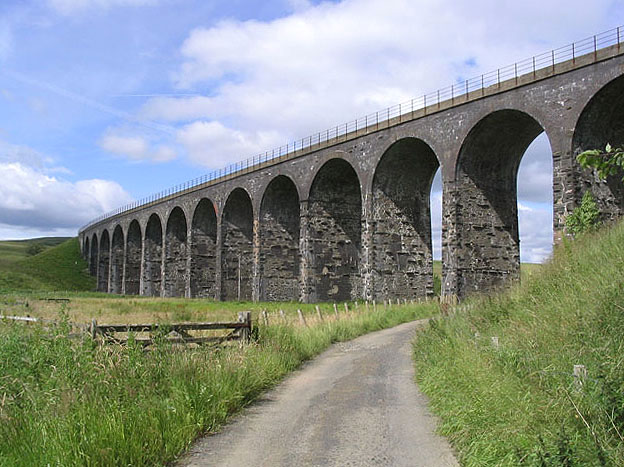
Shankend Viaduct

The Waverley Route, and particularly the section between Dalhousie and Hawick, required heavy construction works with numerous viaducts, cuttings and embankments. To take the line through Hawick, the five-arch Teviot Viaduct at the south end of Hawick station passed over the River Teviot at a height of 42 feet (13 m) and was followed by a 250-foot-long (76 m) embankment, while further down the line Hurdie's Hill cutting above Hawick was 260-foot-long (79 m) and 56 feet (17 m) deep. Similarly, Lynnwood Viaduct, which bridged the Slitrig Water between Hawick and Stobs, had six arches 54 feet (16 m) above the water and followed by a 570-foot-long (170 m) cutting. On the same stretch of line at Acreknowe, a 220-yard-long (200 m) and 60 feet (18 m) deep cutting was blasted through rock. The fifteen 35 feet (11 m) spans of Shankend Viaduct at the south end of Shankend station were 60 feet (18 m) high, while on the approach to Whitrope, Ninestanerigg cutting was 1,000 yards (910 m) in length and 65 feet (20 m) deep and was followed by a 97-foot-high (30 m) embankment. The other viaducts of note were the 22-arch Newbattle Viaduct across the South Esk valley which stretches 1,200 feet (370 m) and the 278-foot-long (85 m) Redbridge Viaduct across the Tweed by Galashiels.

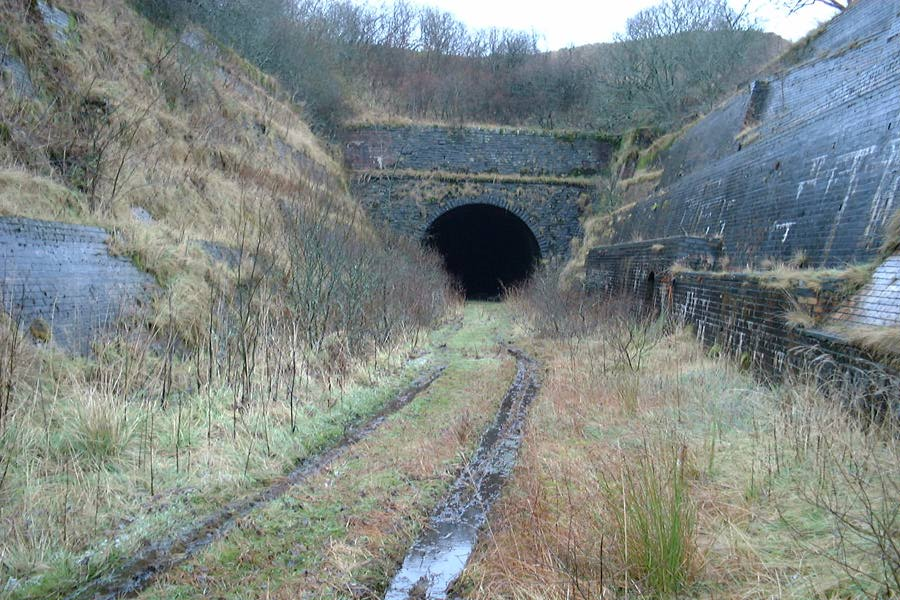
Whitrope Tunnel

The 1,206-yard-long (1,103 m) Whitrope Tunnel was the route's most significant engineering work and was bored through a combination of old red sandstone conglomerate resting on clay slate, stratified sandstone and beds of shale intermixed with bands of limestone and sandstone. The Waverley Route's only other significant tunnel was the 249-yard-long (228 m) Bowland Tunnel which traversed the 'bow' of Gala Water by Bowshank.

The line boasted a large number of intermediate stations – 28 in total after 1908 – which were evenly-spaced with no more than 6 miles (9.7 km) separating any two stations. Six of the stations were junctions at one time – Fountainhall (for Lauder), Galashiels (for Selkirk and Peebles), St Boswells (for Jedburgh and Kelso), Riccarton Junction (for Hexham), Riddings Junction (for Langholm) and Longtown (for Gretna). Spacious facilities were provided at Galashiels, Melrose, St Boswells and Hawick. Galashiels was constructed in the Scottish 'mansion' style incorporating high gables and long chimneys, while St Boswells had a substantial three-storey stone structure and was architecturally the most stylist of the intermediate stations. The station building at Hawick was also substantial but displayed a more dour appearance; the station's main feature was the tall brick Hawick South signal box which, from the north end of the Down platform, overlooked the line curving south away across the Teviot.

== Post-closure ==
=== Edinburgh Crossrail ===
Passenger services were reintroduced on the freight-only section between Portobello Junction and Millerhill on 3 June 2002, when stations were opened at Brunstane and Newcraighall. The reopening was part of the Edinburgh Crossrail scheme aimed at relieving congestion in Edinburgh by providing a rail service from the east. Brunstane was built in simple fashion with a single platform, while Newcraighall, which serves the large Fort Kinnaird retail park, is a larger station with a bus interchange and park and ride facility.

Newcraighall was the terminus for services to and from Fife, a half-hourly train to Dunblane via Waverley and Haymarket having initially been provided before services were extended to Kirkcaldy and Cowdenbeath. Reintroduction of passenger services was a success and provided a psychological boost for campaigners seeking the reopening of the Waverley Route.

=== Borders Railway ===
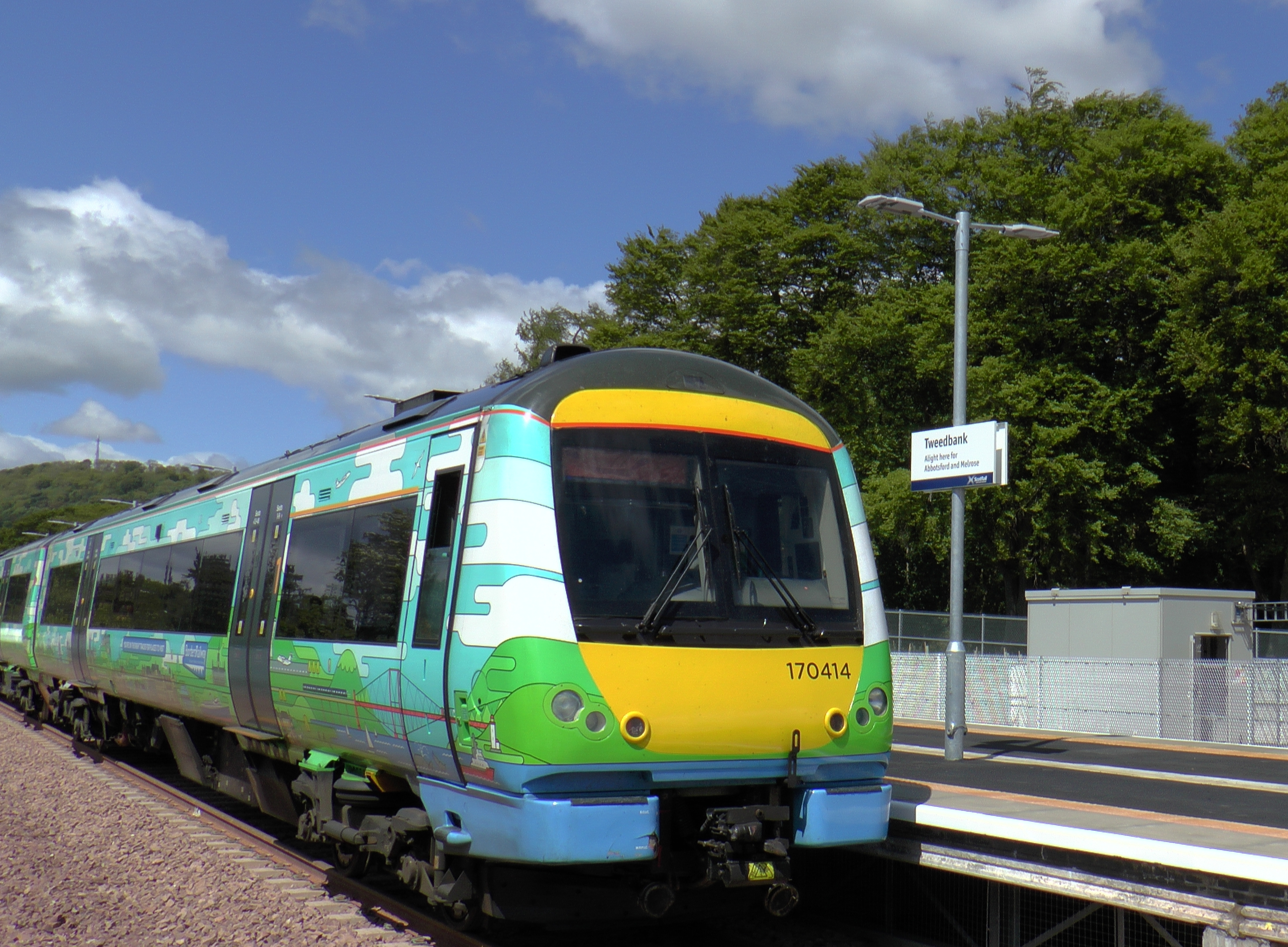
Class 170 170414 at Tweedbank station on the Borders Railway in June 2015

In June 2006, the Waverley Railway (Scotland) Act was passed by the Scottish Parliament by 114 votes to 1. The Act authorised the construction of 31 miles (50 km) of new track from Newcraighall to Tweedbank via Galashiels. The Scottish Executive provided £115 million towards the £151 million estimated cost of the project.

Preparatory works were formally initiated in March 2007 at a site in Galashiels by the Deputy First Minister, Nicol Stephen. It was envisaged that the main construction works would commence in 2011 and services would begin running in 2013. However, problems in the tendering procedure resulted its cancellation in 2011 with the project being handed over to Network Rail at a revised cost of £295 million. Works were initiated in November 2012 with BAM Nuttall appointed the following month as the main contractor.

Tracklaying was completed in February 2015 and services commenced on 6 September 2015. Reopening the line as far as Carlisle has not been ruled out by the Scottish Government, although campaigners have raised doubts over the infrastructure capability of the new line amid concerns that it may make future expansion difficult.

=== Railway preservation societies ===
==== Waverley Route Heritage Association ====
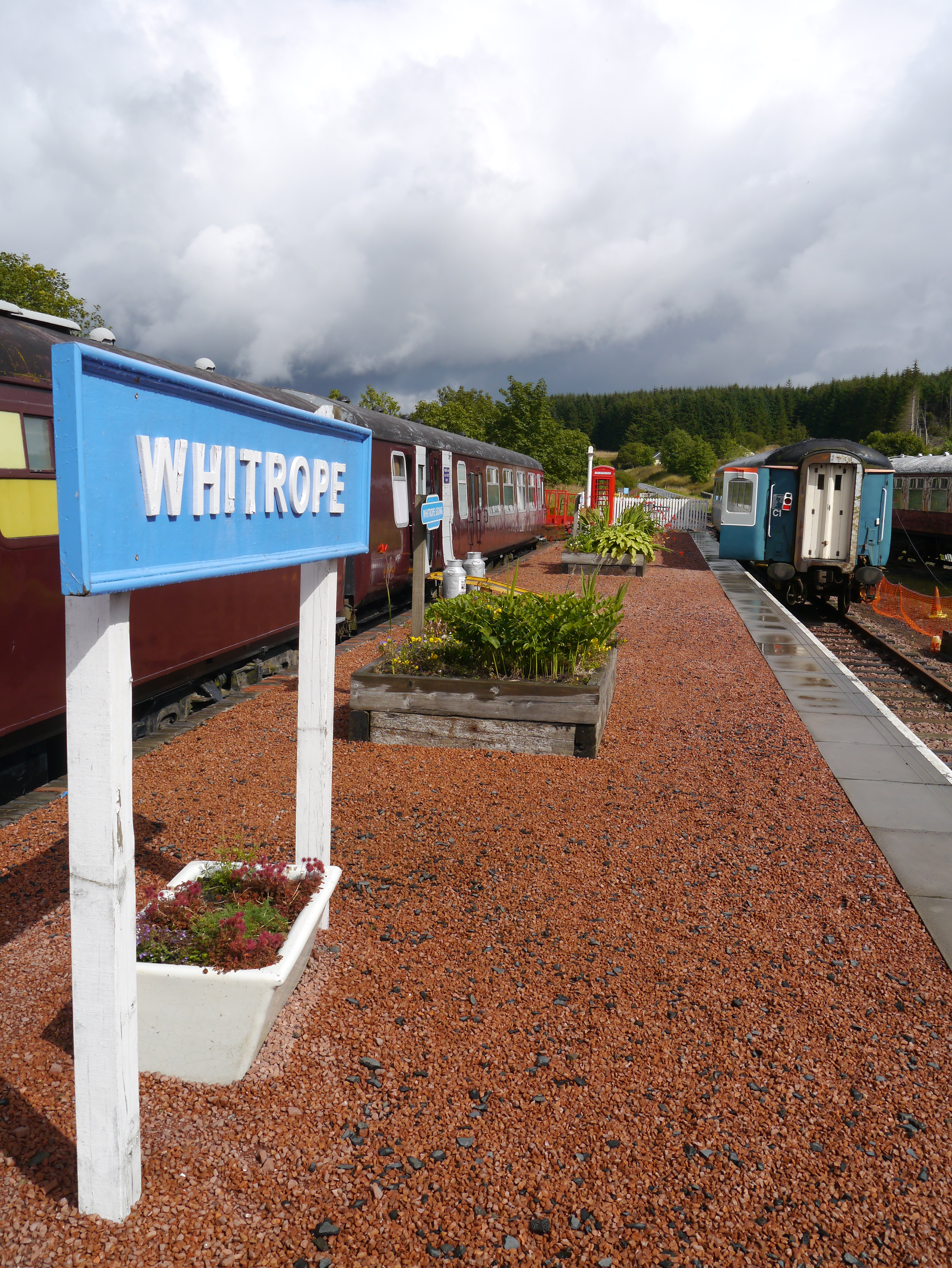
Whitrope Siding station in 2014

By 2002, the voluntary Waverley Route Heritage Association (WRHA) had obtained a lease from Forest Enterprise and laid a short section of track at Whitrope Siding, south of Hawick. The Association's intention is to create a heritage railway between Whitrope and Riccarton which is generally aimed at the tourist market.

A heritage centre and two-coach platform has been constructed on the site of Whitrope Siding, which never previously had a platform, although it was an unofficial stopping place and access was via a stepladder in the guard's brake van. Just north of Whitrope Siding is Whitrope Summit and Whitrope Tunnel; the WRHA has extended its running line for about 750 metres (2,500 ft) to the south portal of the tunnel. Track was also laid at Riccarton Junction but this has subsequently been lifted. The WRHA's first locomotive, Fowler 0-6-0DM diesel shunter no. 4240015, arrived on 9 December 2009, having previously been based at Hartlepool Nuclear Power Station and the Rutland Railway Museum.

On 18 July 2010, the heritage centre was officially opened by the local Member of Parliament and Secretary of State for Scotland Michael Moore in the company of Madge Elliot who led the campaign to save the Waverley Route in the late 1960s. To mark the 150th anniversary of the opening of the Waverley Route on 1 July 2012, Whitrope Siding saw its first passenger train since the line's closure in 1969.

==== Friends of Riccarton Junction ====
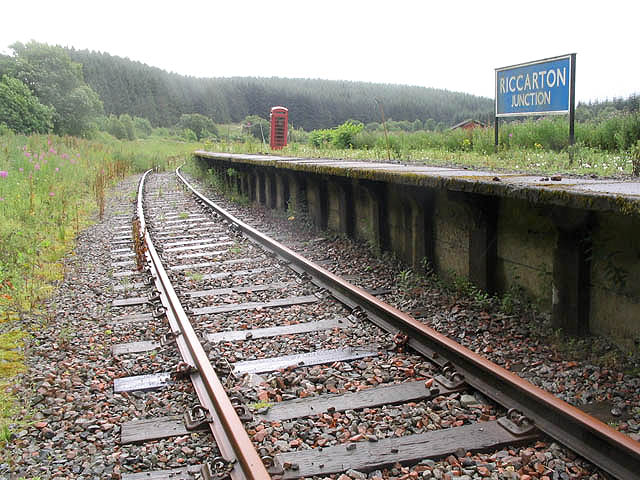
Riccarton Junction in 2007

In 1997, the Friends of Riccarton Junction, a railway preservation society, was set up with the objective of restoring as much as possible of Riccarton Junction station. A lease was taken from the Forestry Commission of the former generator house, a platform and the surrounding area. A small museum was set up in the generator house, more than 300 yards (270 m) of track at the station was laid and the station house and platform with its red telephone box were restored. Open days were held in August 2004 and October 2005. Following disputes with the WRHA and financial difficulties in 2005/2006, the society folded in 2006 after internal disputes surfaced at an annual general meeting.

One of the founding members of the Friends of Riccarton Junction was subsequently involved in carrying out restoration works to Melrose station in 2010.
