= Whitrope Tunnel =

Coordinates: 55°18′10″N 2°45′03″W

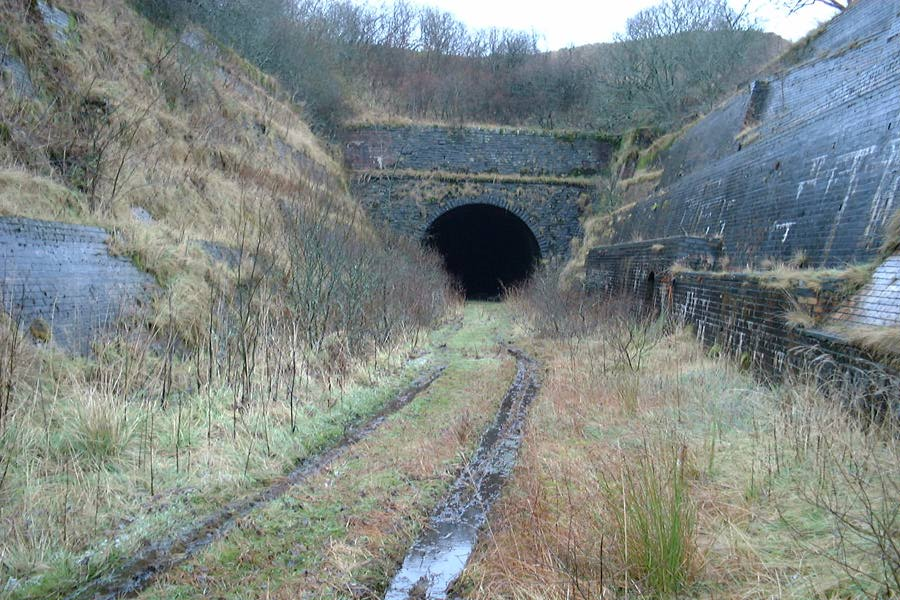
- South entrance of Whitrope Tunnel in December 1999
- Interactive map of Whitrope Tunnel

Overview
- Line: Waverley Route
- Location: Between Shankend and Riccarton Junction
- System: North British Railway

Operation
- Opened: 1862
- Closed: 1969

Technical
- Length: 1,208 yards (1,105 m)
- Track gauge: 4 ft 8 1/2 in (1,435 mm)

The Whitrope Tunnel is a disused railway tunnel in the Scottish Borders, situated 12 miles (19 km) south of Hawick on the Waverley Route, close to Whitrope. It has a length of 1,208 yards (1,105 m).

It is the fourth longest tunnel in Scotland. The tunnel is on the Hawick to Carlisle part of the former line, opened in the 1860s by the North British Railway. The Tunnel was closed in 1969 (as with the Waverley Route itself) by British Rail.

The Waverley Route Heritage Association is currently aiming to restore the tunnel to former standards and use. The tunnel is a Category B listed building and forms a key part of the former route.

In March 2002 there was a partial collapse of the tunnel roof at the south portal, followed by a major collapse in March 2021. Although it is repairable, there is no source of funding and consequently the tunnel has been sealed off for public safety.

== See also ==
- Whitrope Siding
- List of places in the Scottish Borders
- List of places in Scotland
- List of tunnels in the United Kingdom
