= Shankend Viaduct =

Disused railway viaduct in the Scottish Borders, Scotland

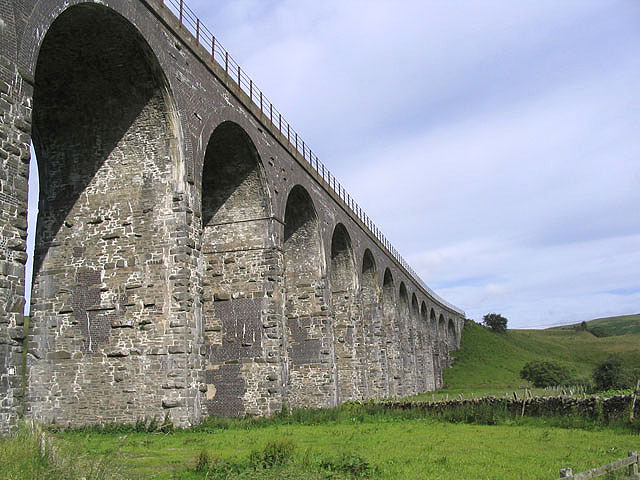
- Coordinates: 55.345435°N 2.756149°W
- OS grid reference: NT 52144 05972
- Carries: Waverley Line
- Crosses: Langside valley
- Locale: Scottish Borders

Characteristics
- Material: Stone
- Height: 18.3 metres (60 ft)
- No. of spans: 15

History
- Built: 1862
- Opened: 1862
- Closed: 6 January 1969

Listed Building – Category B
- Official name: Shankend Viaduct
- Designated: 15 March 1971
- Reference no.: LB2064

Location
- Interactive map of Shankend Viaduct

Shankend Viaduct is a former railway viaduct in the Scottish Borders just over six miles south of the town of Hawick. It is a category B listed building.

It carried the Edinburgh-Carlisle main line of the North British Railway, the Waverley Line, on 15 stone arches across the shallow Langside valley and the Langside burn. It has a maximum height of 18.3 metres (60 ft) and has been extensively repaired with brick patching.

The viaduct was the last section of the Waverley Line and was opened to goods traffic on 28 June 1862 and passenger traffic on 1 July 1862. The contract for the construction of the viaduct was awarded together with the nearby southern Whitrope Tunnel on the same line.

With the closure of the entire route on 6 January 1969, the viaduct became obsolete and the rails have since been removed. In the 2000s, the monument was extensively restored by BRB (Residuary) Limited.

After the successful re-opening of some of the former Waverley Line between Edinburgh and Tweedbank, there have been calls and feasibility studies into whether the entire route south to Carlisle should be re-opened. If this came to fruition, Shankend Viaduct would see trains again.

== See also ==
- List of railway bridges and viaducts in the United Kingdom
