= Riccarton Junction railway station =

Railway Station

Riccarton Junction
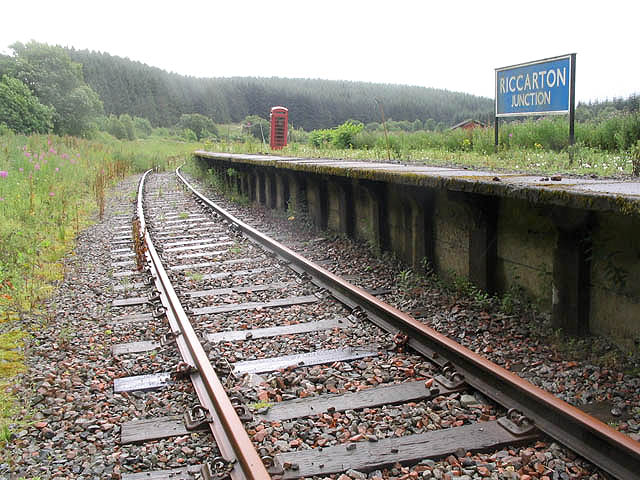
- The station in 2007

General information
- Location: Roxburghshire; Scotland
- Coordinates: 55.2715°N 2.7267°W
- Grid reference: NY539977
- Platforms: 3 (later 2)

Other information
- Status: Disused

History
- Opened: 1 Jul 1862
- Closed: 6 Jan 1969
- Original company: Border Union Railway - The Waverley Route
- Pre-grouping: North British Railway
- Post-grouping: London and North Eastern Railway

Key dates
- 1 January 1905: Renamed Riccarton Junction
Location

Riccarton Junction, in the county of Roxburghshire of the Scottish Borders, was a railway village and station. At its peak, it had 118 residents and its own school, post office and grocery store. The station was an interchange between the Border Counties Railway branch to Hexham and the North British Railway's (NBR's) Border Union Railway (also known as the Waverley Route).

== History ==
The settlement of Riccarton, which adjoined the station, consisted, in 1959, of around thirty houses, with at least one member of each household working for British Railways, which had a civil engineer's depot near the station. There was no road access until a forest track was built in 1963, all access until then being by rail. The isolated position of Riccarton and the need to provide for the villagers may have been one reason why the station remained open until the late 1960s, as by this time ordinary public traffic was virtually non-existent. The branch line from Riccarton Junction to Kielder and Hexham in England was closed on 15 October 1956. The Waverley Route was closed on 6 January 1969. Part of the line was re-opened in 2015 as the Borders Railway, but not as far south as Riccarton Junction.

Preceding station	Disused railways	Following station
Shankend; Line and station closed	North British Railway; Waverley Route	Steele Road; Line and station closed
Shankend; Line and station closed	North British Railway; Border Counties Railway	Saughtree; Line and station closed

== Reuse (and Preservation) ==
Track panels were re-laid by the now wound-up Friends of Riccarton Junction, but these were later lifted in 2011.

The Waverley Route Heritage Association has since reconstructed a section of track between Whitrope Siding and Tunnel as a heritage railway; this is not connected to the site at Riccarton itself. The association, having secured a three-year lease on the 2-mile (3.2 km) section to the site, is aiming to restore this section of the former route from its base at Whitrope down the line into the Junction as the southern terminus of the preserved line.

Preceding station	Heritage railways	Following station
Proposed railways
Whitrope Siding Terminus	Border Union Railway	Terminus

== In the media ==
Ian Nairn visited the station three years after its closing in his 1972 programme Nairn Across Britain: From Leeds into Scotland. By this date the tracks through the station had been lifted.

A 30-minute TV documentary, Slow Train to Riccarton, was produced in 1986. This included both archive film and contemporary footage. Most of the buildings in Riccarton village and station had disappeared, but the schoolhouse and stationmaster's house were still extant.

== See also ==
- List of places in the Scottish Borders

== Notes ==
=== References ===
- Butt, R. V. J. (October 1995). The Directory of Railway Stations: details every public and private passenger station, halt, platform and stopping place, past and present (1st ed.). Sparkford: Patrick Stephens Ltd. ISBN 978-1-85260-508-7. OCLC 60251199. OL 11956311M.
- Thomas, John (1971). A Regional History of the Railways of Great Britain. Vol. VI Scotland: The Lowlands and the Borders (1st ed.). Newton Abbot, Devon: David & Charles. ISBN 0-7153-5408-6. OCLC 16198685.
- Thomas, John; Paterson, Rev A. J. S. (1984). A Regional History of the Railways of Great Britain. Vol. VI Scotland: The Lowlands and the Borders (2nd ed.). Newton Abbott, Devon: David & Charles. ISBN 0-9465-3712-7. OCLC 12521072.
