= Border Union Railway =

Also known as the Waverley route in Scottish and English borders

Overview
- Locale: Dumfriesshire & Roxburghshire, Scotland; Cumberland, England

History
- Opened: 21 July 1859
- Successor line: London and North Eastern Railway
- Closed: 31 December 1922

Technical
- Track gauge: 1,435 mm (4 ft 8 1/2 in)

Border Union (North British) Railways Act 1859
- Act of Parliament
- Parliament of the United Kingdom
- Long title: An Act to authorize the North British Railway Company to make a Railway from their Hawick Line to the Port Carlisle Railway near Carlisle, with divers Branches therefrom, and for other Purposes.
- Citation: 22 & 23 Vict. c. xxiv

Dates
- Royal assent: 21 July 1859

The Border Union Railway was a railway line which connected places in the south of Scotland and Cumberland in England. It was authorised on 21 July 1859 by the Border Union (North British) Railways Act 1859 (22 & 23 Vict. c. xxiv) and advertised as the Waverley Route by the promoters—the North British Railway. It connected the Edinburgh and Hawick Railway at Hawick with Carlisle.

== History ==
The first section of the route was opened between Carlisle and Scotch Dyke on 12 October 1861, to Newcastleton on 1 March 1862, Riccarton Junction on 2 June 1862 and throughout on 24 June 1862. The railway was built as a double-track main line throughout.

== Connections to other lines ==
- Edinburgh and Hawick Railway at Hawick
- Border Counties Railway at Riccarton Junction
- Caledonian Railway Main Line at Gretna
- Maryport and Carlisle Railway, Newcastle and Carlisle Railway, Midland Railway Settle and Carlisle Line and Lancaster and Carlisle Railway at Carlisle Citadel

== Current operations ==
The line was closed to all traffic by British Railways on 5 January 1969. The line was dismantled in 1971.

The Waverley Route Heritage Association have preserved a part of the former route at Whitrope and are working on reopening the section from its base at Whitrope itself down into Riccarton Junction as a heritage railway.
