= Oxton railway station =

Disused railway station in Oxton, Scottish Borders

Oxton
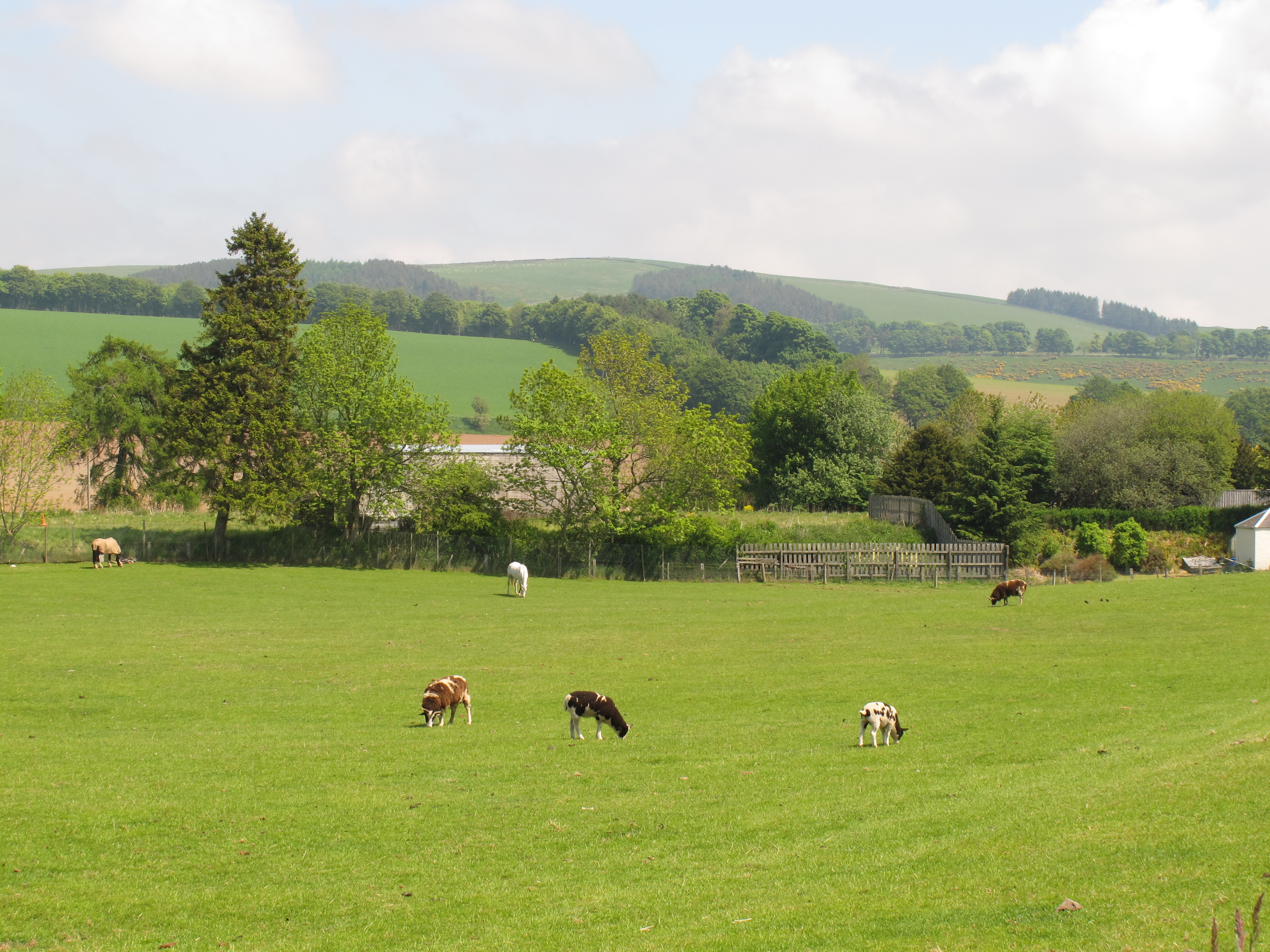
- The embankment near the site of the station in 2013

General information
- Location: Oxton, Scottish Borders; Scotland
- Coordinates: 55.7732°N 2.7996°W
- Grid reference: NT499536
- Platforms: 2

Other information
- Status: Disused

History
- Original company: Lauder Light Railway
- Post-grouping: LNER

Key dates
- 2 July 1901: Opened
- 12 September 1932: Closed to passengers
- 1 October 1958: Closed to goods
Location

Oxton railway station served the village of Oxton, Scottish Borders, Scotland, from 1901 to 1958 on the Lauder Light Railway.

== History ==
The station opened on 2 July 1901 by the Lauder Light Railway. It was situated on the south side of Station Road. On the down platform was the station building. There was no goods shed in the goods yard; a grounded train carriage was used to store goods instead. A ground frame was also here. A siding served a cattle dock behind the down platform. A goods shed was built eventually but after the station closed to passengers on 12 September 1932. It still remained open to goods traffic. In March 1954, the station was downgraded to a public delivery siding. It closed to goods on 1 October 1958.

Preceding station	Disused railways	Following station
Fountainhall; Line and station closed	Lauder Light Railway	Lauder; Line and station closed
