= Lauder railway station =

Disused railway station in Lauder, Scottish Borders

Lauder
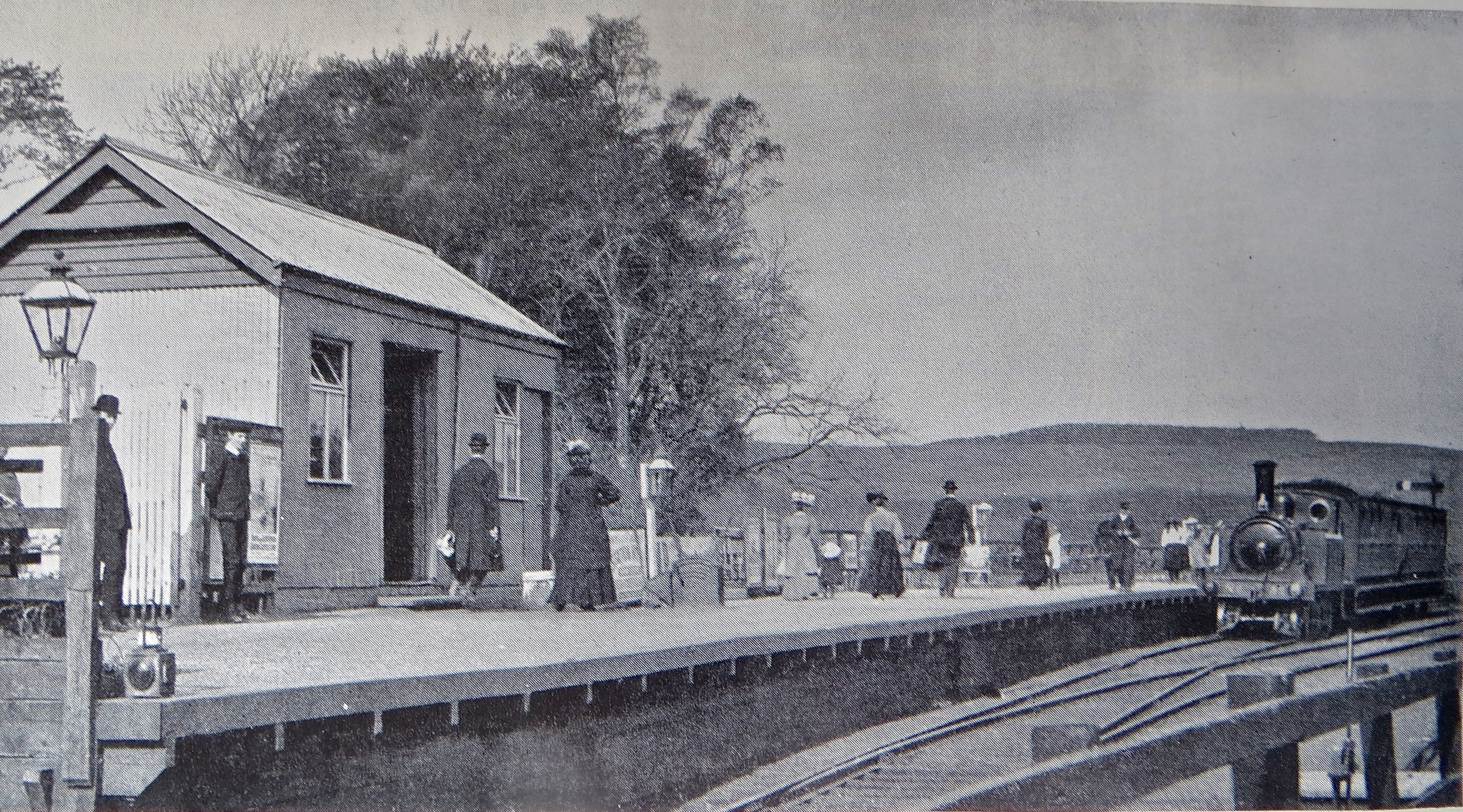
- An NBR train at the station in 1901

General information
- Location: Lauder, Berwickshire; Scotland
- Coordinates: 55.724°N 2.7598°W
- Grid reference: NT523481
- Platforms: 1

Other information
- Status: Disused

History
- Original company: Lauder Light Railway
- Pre-grouping: Lauder Light Railway
- Post-grouping: LNER

Key dates
- 2 July 1901: Opened
- 12 September 1932: Closed to passengers
- 1 October 1958: Closed to goods
Location

Lauder railway station served the town of Lauder, Berwickshire, Scotland, from 1901 to 1958. It was situated on the Lauder Light Railway.

== History ==
The station was opened on 2 July 1901 by the Lauder Light Railway. It was situated at the end of a short road from the A68. There were no lights leading up to the station on the road, which was an issue for people trying to find it in the dark. Despite this, neither the road nor the station ever had lights installed due to the high cost at the time. Like the preceding station at Oxton there was no signal box, just a ground frame. There was a goods yard to the east which had two sidings. On the east side of this was the goods shed, which was not served by rail. Nearby was a locomotive shed with one road.

The station closed to passengers on 12 September 1932 but stayed open to goods. The locomotive shed was closed and quickly demolished. A food and flour depot with two sheds was built to the west during the Second World War, served by a siding to the north of it. The station closed to goods on 1 October 1958.

Preceding station	Disused railways	Following station
Oxton; Line and station closed	Lauder Light Railway	Terminus
