= List of listed buildings in Stow, Scottish Borders =

This is a list of listed buildings in the parish of Stow in the Scottish Borders, Scotland.

== List ==
Name	Location	Date Listed	Grid Ref. (Note: Sometimes known as OSGB36, the grid reference (where provided) is based on the British national grid reference system used by the Ordnance Survey. • "Guide to National Grid". Ordnance Survey. • "Get-a-map". Ordnance Survey.)	Geo-coordinates	Notes	LB Number (Note: Historic Environment Scotland assign a unique alphanumeric identifier to each designated site in Scotland, for listed buildings this always begins with "LB", for example "LB12345".)	Image
Bowland Bridge (Over Gala Water)				55°39′06″N 2°52′04″W	Category C(S)	17406	Upload Photo
3-10 (Inclusive Nos) Galabank				55°42′06″N 2°53′10″W	Category B	17394	Upload Photo
Mitchelston Farm Including Ancillary Buildings And Garden Walls				55°43′24″N 2°51′29″W	Category C(S)	17395	Upload Photo
Burn House Doocot				55°43′59″N 2°53′38″W	Category C(S)	17401	Upload Photo
11-15 (Odd Nos) Townfoot, Post Office				55°41′32″N 2°51′39″W	Category C(S)	51302	Upload Photo
Crookston House, Former Stables Including Boundary Walls				55°45′15″N 2°54′48″W	Category C(S)	51298	Upload Photo
168 Galashiels Road, Manorhead House Including Stables Cottage, Boundary Walls, Gatepiers And Railings				55°41′42″N 2°51′51″W	Category B	19107	Upload Photo
Bowland Policies, North Gate Lodge				55°39′01″N 2°52′11″W	Category B	17397	Upload Photo
Old Crookston House				55°45′33″N 2°55′06″W	Category B	17396	Upload Photo
Crookston House Including Gates, Gatepiers And Quadrant Walls				55°45′16″N 2°55′00″W	Category B	13895	Upload Photo
Crookston House, South Gate Lodge				55°45′03″N 2°54′54″W	Category C(S)	51010	Upload Photo
Bowland Policies, Dryburn (House, Mill Buildings And Dam Bridge)				55°39′16″N 2°52′25″W	Category C(S)	51296	Upload Photo
Burn House, North Lodge, Former Stables				55°44′01″N 2°54′02″W	Category C(S)	51297	Upload Photo
175 And 177 Galashiels Road (Former School) Including 179 Galashiels Road (Former Schoolmaster's House) And Boundary Walls				55°41′43″N 2°51′47″W	Category C(S)	51299	Upload Photo
Bankhouse Farm (Former Coaching Inn)				55°43′14″N 2°53′47″W	Category C(S)	19053	Upload Photo
Townfoot, Town Hall				55°41′31″N 2°51′36″W	Category B	51301	Upload another image
Stow Parish Church, St Mary of Wedale				55°41′23″N 2°51′44″W	Category B	17403	Upload another image
Old Stow Kirk and Burial Ground				55°41′29″N 2°51′42″W	Category B	17404	Upload another image
Bowland House Including Garden Cottages, Walled Garden And Garage Block				55°38′59″N 2°52′51″W	Category B	17407	Upload Photo
Symington House Including Gate Lodge And Boundary Walls				55°43′28″N 2°53′56″W	Category C(S)	51300	Upload Photo
Torquhan House Including Gate Lodge And Gatepiers, Walled Garden And Stable Block				55°43′12″N 2°52′54″W	Category B	17402	Upload Photo
Luggate Water Bridge				55°40′48″N 2°52′34″W	Category B	17399	Upload another image
Burn House				55°43′59″N 2°53′46″W	Category B	17400	Upload Photo
Plenploth Farmhouse With Boundary Walls				55°43′39″N 2°53′44″W	Category C(S)	13900	Upload Photo

== Key ==
The scheme for classifying buildings in Scotland is:

- Category A: "buildings of national or international importance, either architectural or historic; or fine, little-altered examples of some particular period, style or building type."
- Category B: "buildings of regional or more than local importance; or major examples of some particular period, style or building type, which may have been altered."
- Category C: "buildings of local importance; lesser examples of any period, style, or building type, as originally constructed or moderately altered; and simple traditional buildings which group well with other listed buildings."

In March 2016 there were 47,288 listed buildings in Scotland. Of these, 8% were Category A, and 50% were Category B, with the remaining 42% being Category C.
