= Channelkirk =

Parish and community council area in Scotland

Coordinates: 55.7811°N 2.8283°W

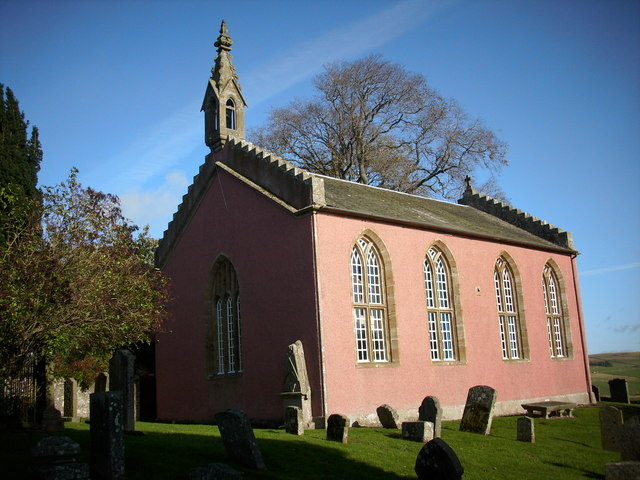
- Channelkirk Church

- Location within the Scottish Borders
- OS grid reference: NT4814954509
- Council area: Scottish Borders
- Lieutenancy area: Roxburgh, Ettrick and Lauderdale
- Country: Scotland
- Sovereign state: United Kingdom
- Post town: Lauder
- Postcode district: TD2
- Dialling code: 01578
- Police: Scotland
- Fire: Scottish
- Ambulance: Scottish
- UK Parliament: Berwickshire, Roxburgh and Selkirk
- Scottish Parliament: Ettrick, Roxburgh and Berwickshire

Channelkirk is a parish and community council area in the north-west corner of the historic county of Berwickshire in the Scottish Borders area of Scotland, forming the upper part of the ancient district of Lauderdale, while the parish of Lauder forms the lower part. The Community Council has the name Oxton and Channelkirk, Oxton being the main village of the parish. It was formerly in the Ettrick and Lauderdale district of Borders Region. A small strip of land along the northern boundary of the parish was added to Ettrick and Lauderdale district and thus also to the community council area, in the Brothershiels area, in 1988.

The parish is bounded on the west by the parish of Stow, on the north by the parishes of Fala and Soutra (in Midlothian) and Humbie (in East Lothian) and on the east and south-east by Lauder (also in Berwickshire). The church is about 6 miles NNW of Lauder, while the village of Oxton (population 272 in 2001) is about 4½ miles NNW of that town.

The parish is drained by several headwaters of the Leader Water, the river of Lauderdale, one of which is Kelphope Burn, which forms the eastern boundary. There are several prominent hills, from Collie Law (1286 ft) in the south to Dun Law (1292 ft) and Ninecairn Edge (1478 ft) on the northern boundary, the westernmost reach of the Lammermuir hills. The parish is about 6½ miles; north to south and its width is about 5 miles.

Channelkirk Church lies in open countryside, commanding a view down the valley. It is the mother kirk of Lauderdale and its site dates back to St Cuthbert. Near the source of the burn Holy Water Cleugh, nearby, St Cuthbert, while a child, was placed under the protection of a religious man during his mother's pilgrimage to Rome, in 636 AD. Afterwards a church was established by Dryburgh Abbey with the name 'Childeschirche' (the old name of Channelkirk), in his honour. More recently its name was Gingle-kirk and was so written in the parochial records and also pronounced as such. The present building was erected in 1817 by James Gillespie Graham, in Perpendicular Gothic style. The bell of 1702 is still rung on Sundays, although services take place at a hall in Oxton in the winter months.

Map of Channelkirk (1900)

Baronies

Oxton, Carfrae, Hartside, and Glengelt were designated "baronies" in law instruments, while Collielaw, Airhouse, Over Howden, and Kirktonhill may be styled "Residences", as distinguished from ordinary farms. However, in the case of Hartside, it was first referred to as a "barony" in 1728, by which time, the designation of " barony " was more a courtesy than signification of real baronial status.

It appears that "Oxton" as a name only came into regular use in the mid 19th century. The name "Ugston" is that commonly found in parish and other records, and in the churchyard, and this form was used for several hundred years. It appears occasionally in legal deeds as "the barony of Ugistoune," or "the territory of Ugistoune" and, from its earliest mention in records, was more than a village; it was an estate or territory, and must have embraced a considerable area. By the beginning of 17th century the lands of Oxton appear to have become separated into several distinct properties, each with its own special designation.

Carfrae has a strategic position commanding the passes from Upper Lauderdale into Lothian, by way of Glengelt and Kelphope glens. The earliest form of the name is Carfra, which is Celtic, probably "caer" (Welsh for fort) together with some other name. Carfrae is first mentioned in a charter in which William de Morville, son of Richard de Morville, Lord of Lauderdale, grants the lands of Carfrae to Henry de Saint Clair (Sinclair), in around 1196. The barony encompassed much of the eastern part of the parish.

Parish authorities

A Parochial Board was established under the Poor Law (Scotland) Act 1845. With the Local Government (Scotland) Act 1894 the Parish Council was established. In 1900 it had 7 members (Chairman: David Tweedie). Civil parishes in Scotland, as units of local government, were abolished in 1929 but have been used later for census and other purposes.

The civil parish has an area of 14,197 acres and a population of 492 (in 2011).
