= Fountainhall (disambiguation) =

Fountainhall or Fountain Hall may refer to:

- Fountain Hall, a historical building at Morris Brown College in Atlanta, Georgia, United States
- Fountainhall, a historic building in Pencaitland, East Lothian, Scotland
- Fountainhall, Scottish Borders, a village in the Scottish Borders, Scotland
  - Fountainhall railway station, a disused station that served the said village
