= Thomas Jamieson Boyd =

Scottish publisher and philanthropist (1818 – 1902)

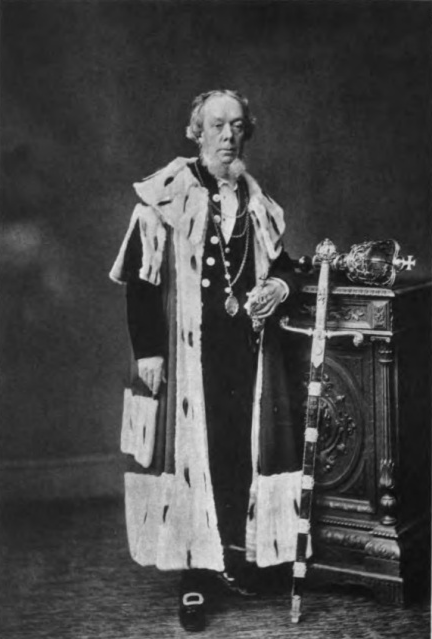
Sir Thomas Jamieson Boyd DL FRSE Sir Thomas Jamieson Boyd

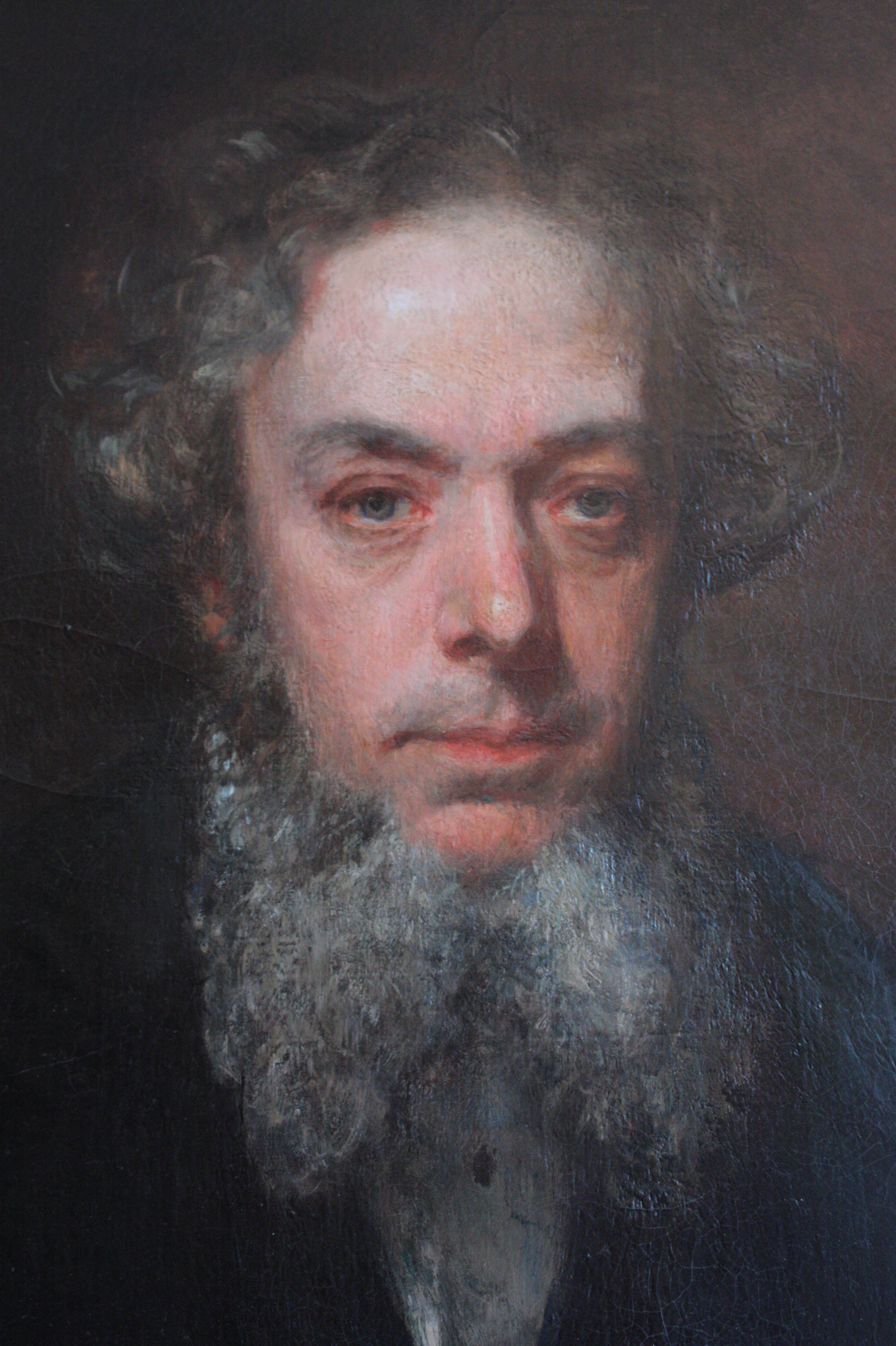
- Thomas Jamieson Boyd by Otto Leyde
- Born: 22 February 1818
- Died: 22 August 1902 (aged 84)
- Spouse: Mary Ann Ferguson

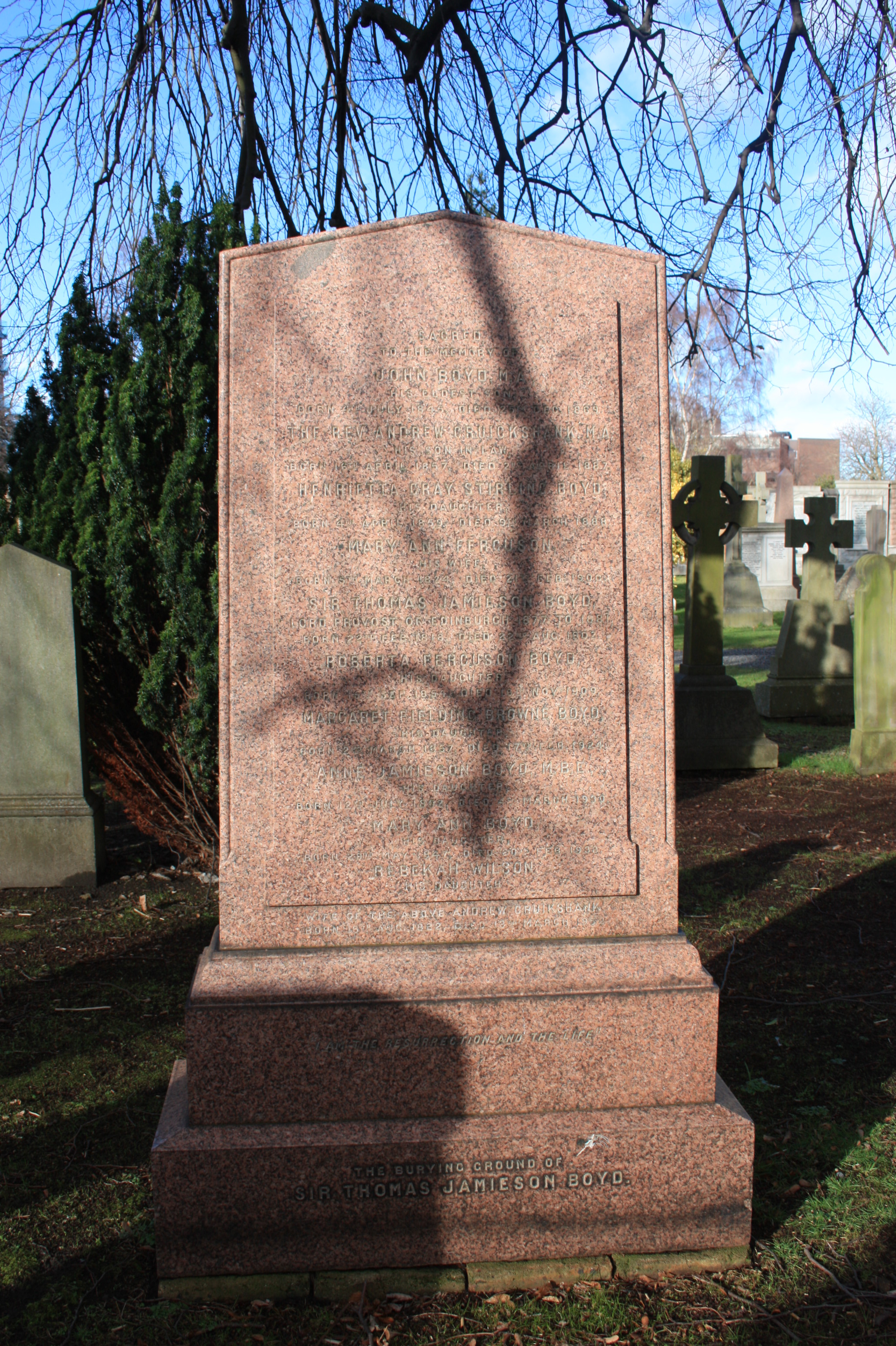
The grave of Thomas Jamieson Boyd, Dean Cemetery, Edinburgh

Sir Thomas Jamieson Boyd, DL, FRSE (22 February 1818–22 August 1902) publisher and philanthropist, was Lord Provost of Edinburgh from 1877 to 1882. He was the catalyst behind the building of the Edinburgh Royal Infirmary on Lauriston Place.

== Life ==
Thomas was born on 22 February 1818 at 16 Charlotte Street in Leith, then an independent burgh, north of Edinburgh. He was the eldest of three sons of John Boyd, corn merchant, and Anne Jamieson, daughter of Thomas Jamieson.

At an early age he entered the renowned Edinburgh printing/publishing company of Oliver and Boyd, at that point run by his uncle, George Boyd. Thomas became the managing partner in 1843. In 1852 he was living at 11 Regent Terrace on Calton Hill.

He was senior partner from 1869 to 1894 (his retiral). His brothers, John Boyd and Thomson Boyd were junior partners in the firm. The great profitability of this company freed Thomas, enabling him to undertake many public-minded projects. In the 1870s, he transformed the Merchant School system in Edinburgh, combining many functions with the Industrial Schools, and transferring the upper-level education of merchants to Edinburgh University through creation of a new Professorship. In the same time period he undertook the raising of funds for, and planning of, a new Royal Infirmary in Edinburgh, a nine-year project. In 1871, he was elected a fellow of the Royal Society of Edinburgh (proposed by Robert Christison).

In 1875, he was elected a city councillor (serving the St Leonards district) and in 1877 was made Lord Provost of Edinburgh. During this period he instructed major rebuilding of Leith Docks, including a new deep water wet dock, the Edinburgh Dock, opened in July 1881. He was knighted on 25 August 1881, by Queen Victoria, during her visit for a large Volunteer review. The knighthood came largely as a result of these several major public works.

In 1896, on his retiral, Oliver & Boyd was bought over by James Thin, but the name continued to live on.

Boyd died at home, 41 Moray Place in the west end of Edinburgh on 22 August 1902. He is buried in Dean Cemetery. The grave lies in the first northern extension to the main cemetery facing its southern path, set in the second row.

== Family ==
Thomas married Mary Ann Ferguson on 6 June 1844. Lady Boyd died on 21 February 1900 at their home in Edinburgh. They had two sons and six daughters.

His granddaughter Mary Ferguson Macnaghten Boyd married Edmund Taylor Whittaker and were parents to John Macnaghten Whittaker.

His nephew, the son of his brother John Boyd, was Francis Darby Boyd.

== Artistic recognition ==
Boyd was sculpted by William Brodie in 1871. A second bust by Brodie, carved in 1880, stood in the entrance hall of the new Edinburgh Royal Infirmary. Around the same time a portrait, by Otto Leyde RSA was hung in the Merchant Hall in Edinburgh. A full-length portrait, also by Leyde, is in the possession of Edinburgh City Council.

== Other positions held ==
- Master of the Merchant Company of Edinburgh (1869-1871)
- Deputy Lieutenant of Edinburgh
- Chairman of the Fishery Board for Scotland
- Commissioner of the Northern Lights (Scottish Lighthouse Board) (1877-1882)
- Commissioner for Scottish Educational Endowments (1882-1889)
- Honorary Colonel of the Queens Regiment in Scotland
- Curator of Edinburgh University (1879-1885)
- Director of the Union Bank of Scotland
- Director of the Scottish Provident Institution
- Justice of the Peace
- Elder of the United Free Church

== Sources ==
- "Former Members of the Royal Society of Edinborough, 1783 – 2002" (PDF). The Royal Society of Edinburgh.
- Norgate, Gerald le Grys (1912). "Boyd, Thomas Jamieson" . In Lee, Sidney (ed.). Dictionary of National Biography (2nd supplement). London: Smith, Elder & Co.
