= List of listed buildings in Heriot, Scottish Borders =

This is a list of listed buildings in the parish of Heriot in the Scottish Borders, Scotland.

== List ==
Name	Location	Date Listed	Grid Ref. (Note: Sometimes known as OSGB36, the grid reference (where provided) is based on the British national grid reference system used by the Ordnance Survey. • "Guide to National Grid". Ordnance Survey. • "Get-a-map". Ordnance Survey.)	Geo-coordinates	Notes	LB Number (Note: Historic Environment Scotland assign a unique alphanumeric identifier to each designated site in Scotland, for listed buildings this always begins with "LB", for example "LB12345".)	Image
Carcant Bridge Over Carcant Burn				55°45′42″N 3°00′47″W	Category C(S)	8208	Upload Photo
Heriot House Including Outhouses And Former Stables				55°46′40″N 2°57′14″W	Category B	13405	Upload Photo
Carcant House				55°45′41″N 3°00′49″W	Category C(S)	8207	Upload Photo
Borthwick Hall				55°45′34″N 2°58′40″W	Category C(S)	6722	Upload Photo
Heriot Parish Church (Church Of Scotland) Including Graveyard Walls, Gatepiers And Gravestones				55°45′45″N 2°58′23″W	Category C(S)	50278	Upload Photo

== Key ==
The scheme for classifying buildings in Scotland is:

- Category A: "buildings of national or international importance, either architectural or historic; or fine, little-altered examples of some particular period, style or building type."
- Category B: "buildings of regional or more than local importance; or major examples of some particular period, style or building type, which may have been altered."
- Category C: "buildings of local importance; lesser examples of any period, style, or building type, as originally constructed or moderately altered; and simple traditional buildings which group well with other listed buildings."

In March 2016 there were 47,288 listed buildings in Scotland. Of these, 8% were Category A, and 50% were Category B, with the remaining 42% being Category C.
