= James Thin (bookseller) =

Scottish bookseller and businessman

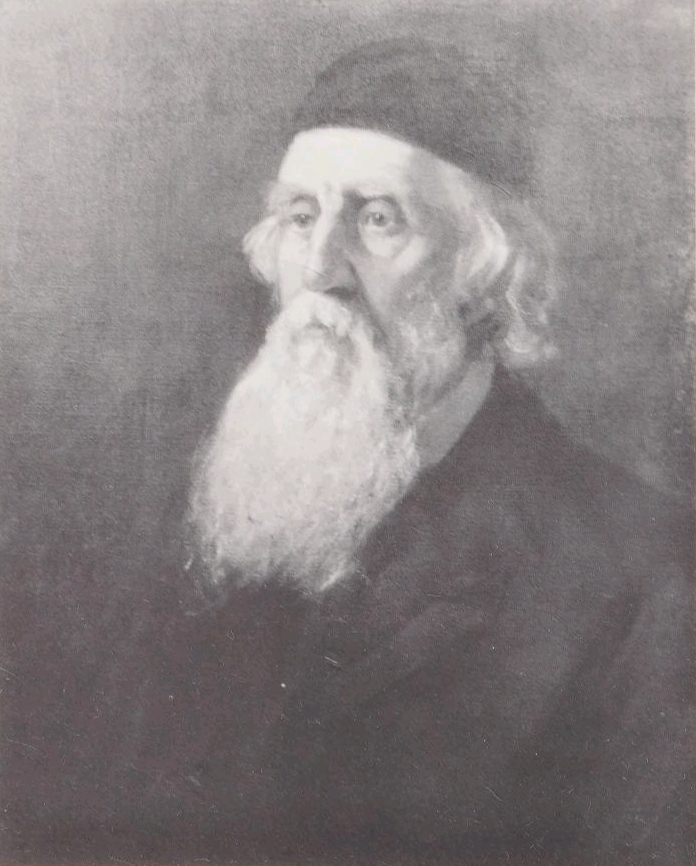
- Portrait of James Thin by Henry W. Kerr
- Born: 23 March 1824; Edinburgh, Scotland
- Died: 11 April 1915 (aged 91); Edinburgh, Scotland
- Resting place: Grange Cemetery, Edinburgh
- Occupation: Bookseller
- Known for: Founding a bookshop chain

James Thin (23 March 1824–11 April 1915) was a Scottish bookseller and businessman. In 1848, after a five-year apprenticeship and a further seven years working as a bookshop assistant, he started his own bookselling business. He worked in the business for over 60 years and was succeeded by four generations of his family. By the end of the 20th century, the firm had grown into a national concern, with 35 shops in Scotland and England, but it went into voluntary administration in 2002 with debts of £5 million.

James Thin played an active role in several public and philanthropic bodies. He was an active member of his church, serving as a teacher in religious instruction and as a church officer. He was a noted hymnologist and amassed a collection of some 2,500 hymn books and works of hymnic literature.

== Early career ==
James Thin was born in Edinburgh, the son of George Thin and Helen Ainslie. At the age of 11, he became apprenticed to James McIntosh, a bookseller at 5 North College Street, Edinburgh. His initial wage was 2/6d (12½ pence) per week, out of which he had to provide his pens and pencils. His working hours were 9 am to 9 pm, Monday to Saturday. Although he was entitled to a break of one hour at midday, his employer arranged for his lunch to be brought to the shop so that James could remain at his post throughout the day.

One of his duties as an apprentice was to collect orders from the offices of the many publishers who were based in Edinburgh at the time. He thus became acquainted with some of the leading names in the Scottish publishing industry, including A & C Black, W. R. Chambers, and Thomas Nelson.

He finished his apprenticeship in 1841, after which he worked as an employee of James McIntosh for a further seven years.

== Own business ==
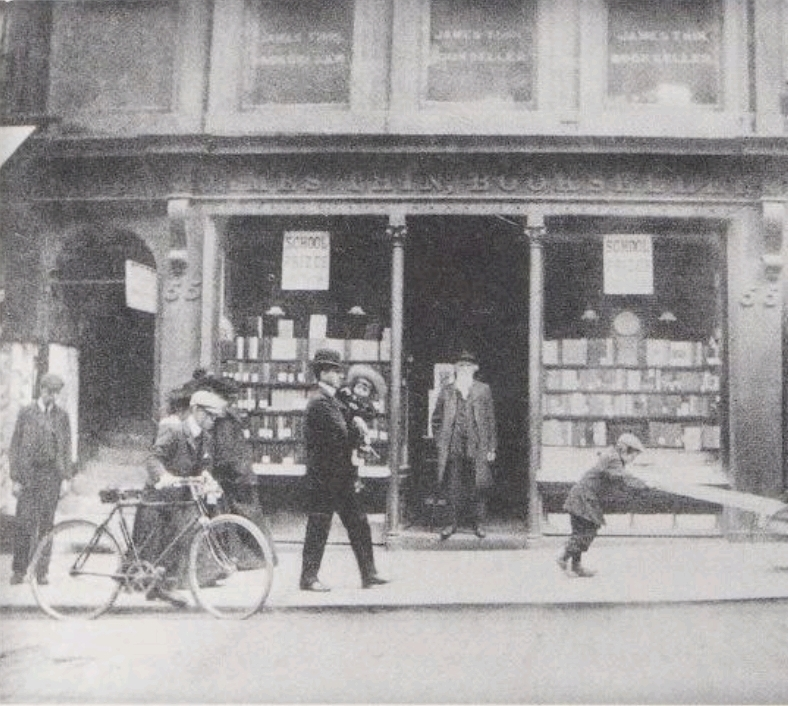
James Thin's bookshop in South Bridge

In 1848, at the age of 24, Thin went into business for himself. He purchased the assets of a Mr. Rickard, a bookseller who was in financial difficulties. Rickard's shop was at 14 Infirmary Street, where he had recently moved from 55 South Bridge. Thin started trading at the Infirmary Street premises on 3 April, trading under his own name (the business only became James Thin Ltd in the 1970s).

Trade was slow at first, but improved over the next few years, thanks in part to the shop's location close to Edinburgh University. In 1853, Thin took a lease on two rooms above a shop at 54 South Bridge. The only access to these premises was by an external staircase from the street. Although these rooms were in the same block as the Infirmary Street shop, the only communication between them was by a speaking tube. Two years later the firm further expanded into an adjacent shop at 55 South Bridge (the premises previously occupied by Mr. Rickard). An opening was built into the back wall of this shop to give access to the Infirmary Street premises. Trade continued to improve and Thin was soon advertising the business as "the largest retail bookselling establishment in Edinburgh".

James Thin worked in the business for the rest of his life. In 1880, he was joined by his eldest son, James Hay Thin, who became a senior partner. Overall, the firm remained in the family for five generations, ending with the founder's great-great-granddaughter, Jackie Thin, who served as managing director until the closure of the firm in 2002.

During the second half of the 20th century, the firm grew into a national concern. It opened new shops and acquired existing ones throughout the UK, and also expanded into publishing. About half of its business came from educational markets. By the end of the century, it had 35 branches, with 650 staff and a stock of 85,000 titles. The South Bridge shop remained its flagship store and head office.

In 2002, the company went into voluntary administration, having debts of £5 million. According to The Times, a significant factor in the firm's collapse was its rapid expansion into England in the mid-1990s.

== Church and public life ==
In 1841, Thin joined the Bristo United Presbyterian Church (later Bristo United Free church) to which he was to devote considerable time and energy for the rest of his life. Having finished his apprenticeship that year, he started teaching religious instruction in evening classes at the church's mission in Cowan's Close. He continued in that role for eleven years, during which time attendance at the classes rose from 30 to 140. He then took charge of the senior female class at the Christian Instruction Society, which met at the Old Session House in Bristo. This work lasted until 1861, after which he became a teacher at the society's young men's classes.

In 1855, he was elected an elder of the church. He held that office for 61 years, for 53 of which he served as Session Clerk. He was succeeded in that role by his son, James Hay Thin.

Thin played an active role in several public and philanthropic bodies. He was at various times the master of the Merchant Company of Edinburgh, a trustee and later chairman of the Edinburgh Savings Bank, president of the Trade Protection Society, director of the Edinburgh City Mission, and director of the Edinburgh Destitute Society.

== Hymnologist ==
James Thin was also a noted hymnologist. He served on the selection committee of the Presbyterian Hymnal and later of the Church Hymnary. His writings on the subject are quoted extensively in John Julian's A Dictionary of Hymnology. He amassed a vast collection of hymn books and hymnic literature, numbering some 2,500 volumes. The Scotsman described the collection as "perhaps the finest and most complete to be found in the British Islands." After Thin's death, the collection was donated to the library at New College.

== Family and personal life ==
In 1849, Thin married Catherine Traquair, with whom he had seven sons. Catherine died in 1869, aged 47. In 1870, he purchased a plot of land in Stow in the Scottish Borders, on which he had a family house built. The house, which was named Ashlea, was completed in 1873. In 1885, at the age of 61, Thin married Elizabeth Darling, a farmer’s daughter. She died in 1905.

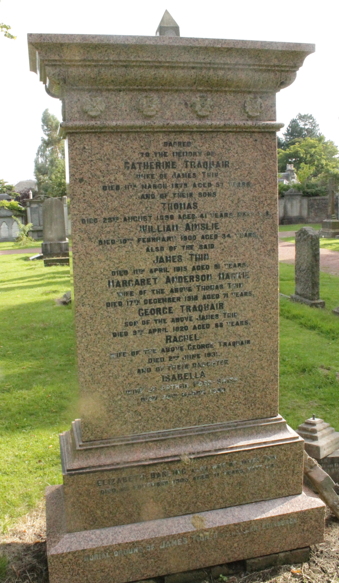
The grave of James Thin, Grange Cemetery

In later life, Thin lived at 22 Lauder Road in The Grange, Edinburgh, where he died in 1915 aged 91. He is buried in the Grange Cemetery.

Thin's eldest son, James Hay Thin (1853–1943), was involved in the family business for most of his working life. Like his father, he was a long-standing elder and Session Clerk of Bristo Church. He was also a director of publishers Oliver and Boyd and Gurney & Jackson. He died in Dollar in 1943 at the age of 90.

James Thin's grandson, J. Ainslie Thin (James Hay Thin's eldest son), worked in the business from shortly before World War 1 until the 1950s. In 1917, he was reported missing in action, but was in fact taken prisoner and spent the rest of the war in a German POW camp. His son, James ("Jimmy") Thin (1923–1997), joined the firm in 1949, and along with his cousin, D Ainslie Thin (1933–2023), oversaw much of the business's expansion during the following decades. He was a noted mountaineer and a skilled linguist and was described as a great raconteur. D Ainslie Thin's three children, Jackie, Hilary, and Jamie, represented the fifth and final generation of the Thin family to work in the business, with Jackie serving as managing director until the closure of the firm in 2002.

== Published works ==
- Memorials of Bristo United Presbyterian Church. Edinburgh. 1879. With William H. Goold. Printed for the congregation by Morrison & Gibb.
- Notes of 1887 to the Scottish Presbyterian Hymnal. Edinburgh. 1887.
- Reminiscences of Booksellers and Bookbinding in Edinburgh in the Time of William IV. London: Oliver & Boyd. 1905. The text of an address delivered to a meeting of booksellers' assistants in October 1904.
