= Allanshaws =

Farm and locality in Scottish Borders, Scotland

Coordinates: 55.67°N 02.81°W

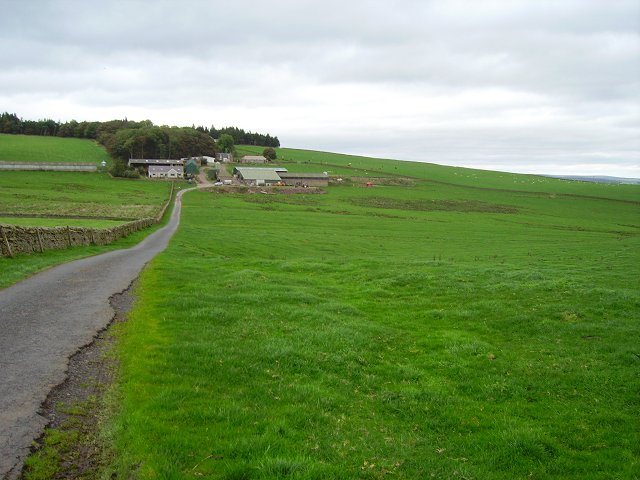

- Location within the Scottish Borders
- OS grid reference: NT4943
- Council area: Scottish Borders
- Country: Scotland
- Sovereign state: United Kingdom
- Police: Scotland
- Fire: Scottish
- Ambulance: Scottish
- UK Parliament: Berwickshire, Roxburgh and Selkirk
- Scottish Parliament: Midlothian South, Tweeddale and Lauderdale

Allanshaws is a place and farm off the B6362, in Lauderdale, by the Allan Water, in the parish of Melrose in the Scottish Borders area of Scotland, formerly part of Roxburghshire.

Nearby are Addinston, Galashiels, Killochyett, Lauder, Stow.

== See also ==
- List of places in the Scottish Borders
- List of places in Scotland
