= Stow of Wedale Town Hall =

Municipal building in Stow of Wedale, Scotland

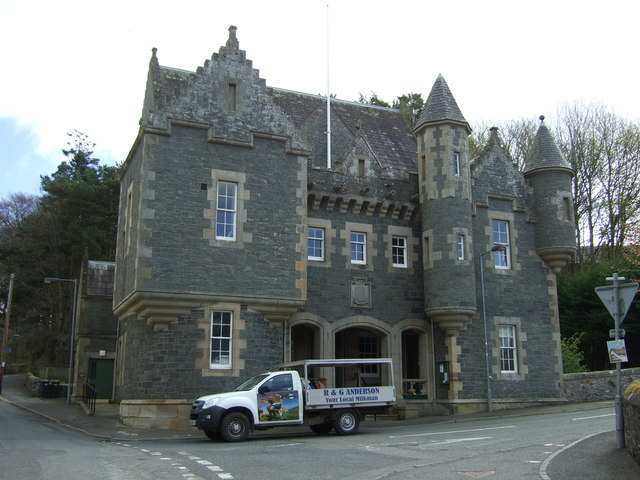
- Stow of Wedale Town Hall

- Shown in the Scottish Borders
- 55.6918°N 2.8600°W
- Location: Earlston Road, Stow of Wedale

History
- Built: 1857

Site notes
- Architectural style: Scottish baronial style

Listed Building – Category B
- Official name: Townfoot, Town Hall
- Designated: 17 March 2009
- Reference no.: LB51301

Stow of Wedale Town Hall is a municipal building in Earlston Road, Stow of Wedale, Scottish Borders, Scotland. The structure, which serves as a community events venue, is a Category B listed building.

== History ==
The building was commissioned by Captain Alexander Mitchell-Innes, who, in 1839, had inherited a large country estate, which had originally been amassed by a former Deputy Governor of the Royal Bank of Scotland, Gilbert Innes. Mitchell-Innes had plans to develop Stow into a holiday destination for people living in Edinburgh. The foundation stone for the new building was laid with full masonic rites, with Mitchell-Innes presiding as acting grand master, on 21 February 1854. It was designed in the Scottish baronial style, built in rubble masonry with ashlar stone dressings and was completed in 1857.

The design involved an asymmetrical main frontage of five bays facing Earlston Road. The central section of three bays formed an arcade with three openings on the ground floor, a carved panel depicting the coat of arms of Alexander Mitchell-Innes above the central opening, and three square-shaped windows on the first floor. Above the windows, there was a machicolated parapet, three water spouts shaped to resemble cannons, a central gablet and a fleur-de-lis finial. The left hand bay was curved on the ground floor and corbeled on the first floor with sash windows on both floors and a stepped gable above. The right-hand bay was fenestrated with sash windows on both floors with a stepped gable above: it was flanked by bartizans on both sides although the left-hand bartizan was corbelled out at a lower level than the right-hand one and was octagonal rather than circular in its upper stage. Internally, the principal rooms were the reading room on the left-hand side on the ground floor and the main assembly hall on the first floor.

Mitchell-Innes continued to develop the town and commissioned the Church of St Mary of Wedale in 1876. However, following the collapse of the City of Glasgow Bank in 1878, most of the proposed housing was never built. The town hall continued to serve as a community events venue throughout the 20th century and into the 21st century. The reading room was adapted to form a local history museum and archive, managed by the Gala Water History and Heritage Association, in 2005.

== See also ==
- List of listed buildings in Stow, Scottish Borders
