= Addinston =

Village in the Scottish Borders, UK

Coordinates: 55.76°N 02.76°W

- Location within the Scottish Borders
- OS grid reference: NT5253
- Council area: Scottish Borders
- Country: Scotland
- Sovereign state: United Kingdom
- Police: Scotland
- Fire: Scottish
- Ambulance: Scottish
- UK Parliament: Berwickshire, Roxburgh and Selkirk
- Scottish Parliament: Midlothian South, Tweeddale and Lauderdale

Addinston is a farming village, off the A697, close to the Carfraemill roundabout, with two hill forts and settlements, in Lauderdale in the Scottish Borders area of Scotland, in the former Berwickshire.

The Cleekhimin Burn joins the Leader Water, or River Leader, at Wiselawmill.

Places nearby include Allanshaws, Borthwick Hall, Fountainhall, the Heriot Water, Killochyett, Lauder, Oxton and Stow

== See also ==
- List of places in the Scottish Borders
- List of places in Scotland
