= Heriot railway station =

Disused railway station in Heriot, Scottish Borders

Heriot
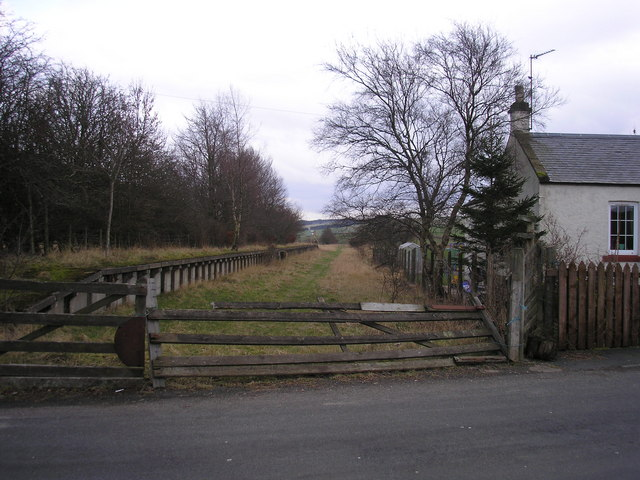
- Remains of the station site in 2007, before reinstatement of the railway line

General information
- Location: Heriot, Scottish Borders; Scotland
- Coordinates: 55.7806°N 2.953°W
- Grid reference: NT403545
- Platforms: 2

Other information
- Status: Disused

History
- Original company: North British Railway
- Pre-grouping: North British Railway
- Post-grouping: LNER

Key dates
- 4 August 1848: Opened
- 6 January 1969: Closed
Location

Heriot railway station served the village of Heriot, Scottish Borders, Scotland from 1848 to 1969 on the Waverley Route.

== History ==
The station opened on 4 August 1848 by the North British Railway. The station was situated on both sides of Heriot Way on the B709. Heriot is the only station on the Waverley Route to have staggered platforms. The goods yard was on the up side and had two sidings, one of which served a cattle dock. Goods services ceased on 18 May 1964 and the sidings were quickly lifted. The station was downgraded to an unstaffed halt on 27 March 1967, although the suffix 'halt' was not shown in the timetables. The station was closed to passengers on 6 January 1969.

In September 2015, the Waverley Route partially reopened as part of the Borders Railway. Although the railway passes through the original Heriot station, it was not reopened.

Preceding station	Historical railways	Following station
Tynehead; Line open, station closed	North British Railway; Waverley Route	Fountainhall; Line open, station closed
