= Heriot, Scottish Borders =

Village in Scottish Borders, Scotland

Coordinates: 55°45′55″N 2°58′05″W

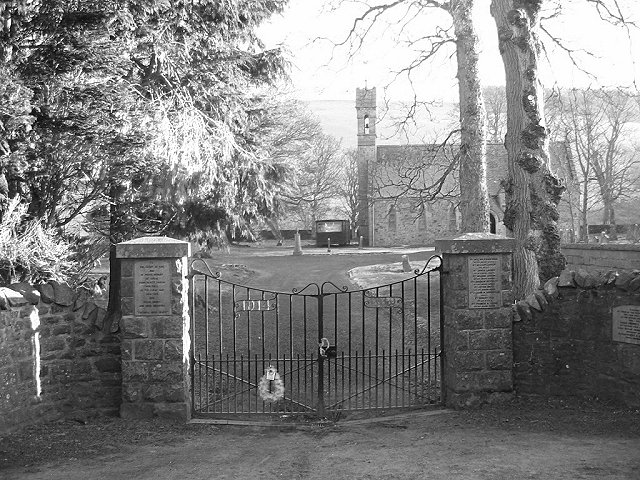
Heriot Kirk, the village war memorial is embedded in the gate posts

Heriot is a small village in the Moorfoot Hills southeast of Edinburgh, Scotland, within Eildon (part of the Scottish Borders council area, though historically in Midlothian). The village comprises some 150 dwellings, spread over a geographical area of around 50 square miles (130 km^{2}), most of which is moorland. Connected to the rest of the world primarily through the A7 road, Heriot had a railway station from 1849 until the branch line closures instigated by Beeching caused the track to be uplifted in the 1960s. The Scottish Parliament voted, in 2006, to reinstate the railway, but without a station at Heriot.

The School (as of Sept 2016) has 36 pupils. There are numerous community groups operating in the village including drama groups, WRI, a community choir and a karate club.

Places near to Heriot include Borthwick, Carcant, Crichton, Fala, Stow of Wedale and Innerleithen.

== See also ==
- List of places in the Scottish Borders
- List of places in Scotland
- Heriot, New Zealand
- Heriotdale
