= George Darling (physician) =

Scottish physician

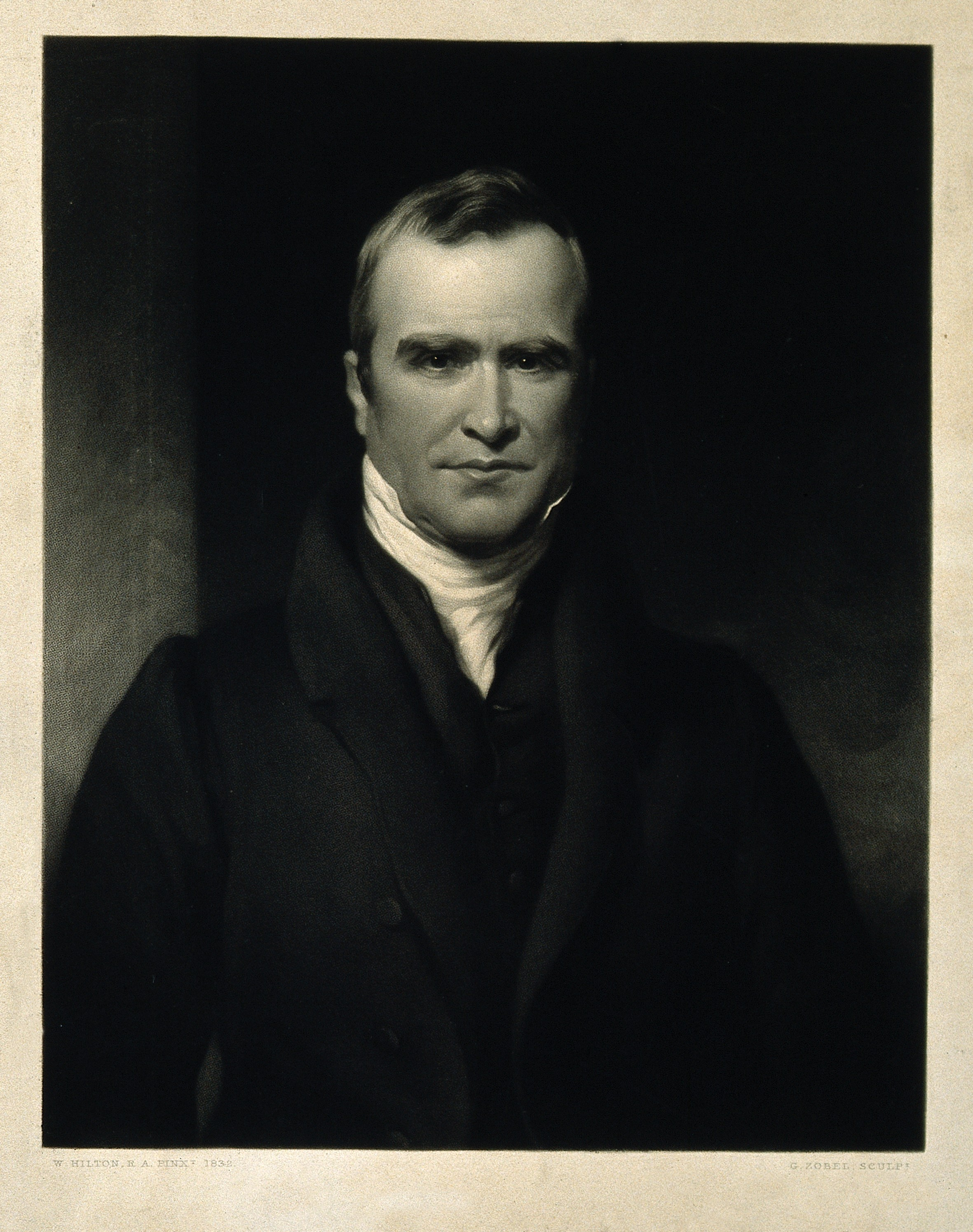
- Born: 1782? Stow
- Died: 30 March 1862
- Occupation: Physician

George Darling (1779 – 30 March 1862) was a Scottish physician.

== Life ==
Darling was born at Stow, near Galashiels, was educated at the university of Edinburgh, and, having made two or three voyages as surgeon in the East India Company's service, settled in London in general practice. At the end of four years he began to practise as a physician, having become a licentiate of the Royal College of Physicians in London. He had a considerable intimacy with artists, David Wilkie, Benjamin Haydon, Thomas Lawrence, and Francis Leggatt Chantrey being both his patients and his friends.

== Works ==
In 1814 Darling published anonymously An Essay on Medical Economy, dedicated to his friend Sir James Mackintosh. It covered the question of medical reform, of the education, practice and status of medical men, and medical examinations. At a later period he printed a pamphlet Instructions for Making Unfermented Bread (1846, anonymously published, 17th edition 1851).
