= Bowland railway station =

Railway Station

Bowland
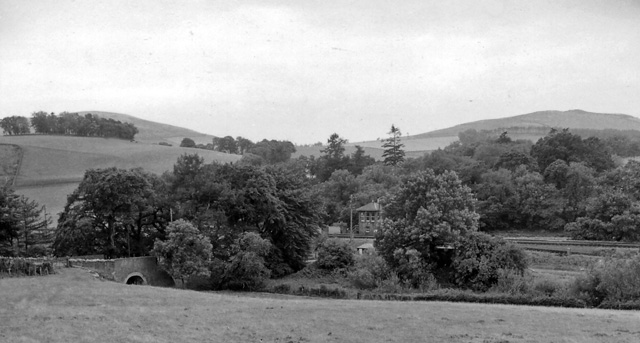
- Station site and Bowland Signalbox seen from a distance in 1962.

General information
- Location: Bowland, Scottish Borders; Scotland
- Coordinates: 55.6518°N 2.8666°W
- Grid reference: NT455401
- Platforms: 2

Other information
- Status: Disused

History
- Original company: North British Railway
- Pre-grouping: North British Railway
- Post-grouping: LNER British Rail (Scottish Region)

Key dates
- 4 August 1848: Station opened as Bowland
- May 1849: Station name changed to Bowland Bridge
- July 1862: Station name changed back to Bowland
- 7 December 1953: Station closed to passengers
- 23 March 1964: Station closed to goods traffic
Location

Bowland railway station (Bowland Bridge between May 1849 and July 1862) was a railway station in the village of Bowland, near Galashiels, Scotland. Located on the now closed Waverley Route, it was opened to passengers on 4 August 1848, closing to passengers on 7 December 1953 and finally to goods services on 23 March 1964. The line itself was closed and lifted in 1969, although the section of it which Bowland was on re-opened in 2015.

The station consisted of two platforms with a wooden waiting room on each and a small ticket office next to one of the platforms. A signal box, one siding goods yard and weigh bridge were all found near the site. There are very few remains of the station left, but a building near the sidings is still extant.

Preceding station	Historical railways	Following station
Stow; Line and station open	North British Railway; Waverley Route	Galashiels; Line and station open
