= Heriotdale =

- Location within Gauteng Location within South Africa
- Coordinates: 26.210°S 28.116°E
- Country: South Africa
- Province: Gauteng
- Municipality: City of Johannesburg
- Main Place: Johannesburg
- Established: 1946

Area
  - Total: 0.93 km^{2} (0.36 sq mi)

Population (2011)
  - Total: 7
  - Density: 7.5/km^{2} (19/sq mi)

Racial makeup (2011)
  - Black African: 100.0%

First languages (2011)
  - Tswana: 42.9%
  - Northern Sotho: 28.6%
  - Zulu: 14.3%
  - Venda: 14.3%
- Time zone: UTC+2 (SAST)
- Postal code (street): 2094

Heriotdale is a suburb of Johannesburg, South Africa. The suburb lying south of Malvern and north of Rosherville, is an industrial area. It is located in Region F of the City of Johannesburg Metropolitan Municipality.

== History ==
Prior to the discovery of gold on the Witwatersrand in 1886, the suburb lay on land on one of the original farms called Doornfontein. Before becoming a suburb, the area was mining land with the Heriot Mine opening in 1887. After the gold was exhausted in the mine, the land was proclaimed as a suburb in October 1946. The mine is said to have been named after the Scottish goldsmith George Heriot, the "Jingling Geordie" in Sir Walter Scott's novel The Fortunes of Nigel. Some experts, however, claim the mine was instead named after the village of Heriot in Midlothian, Scotland. This village was founded in 1164 as Herth, but its name was changed in 1198 to Hereget (from the Old English here-geat, meaning a break in a hillside through which troops could march.

== Sources ==
- Stals, Prof. Dr. E.L.P (ed.). 1978. Afrikaners in die Goudstad, vol. 1: 1886 - 1924. Cape Town/Pretoria: HAUM.
