= Fountainhall railway station =

Disused railway station in Fountainhall, Scottish Borders

Fountainhall
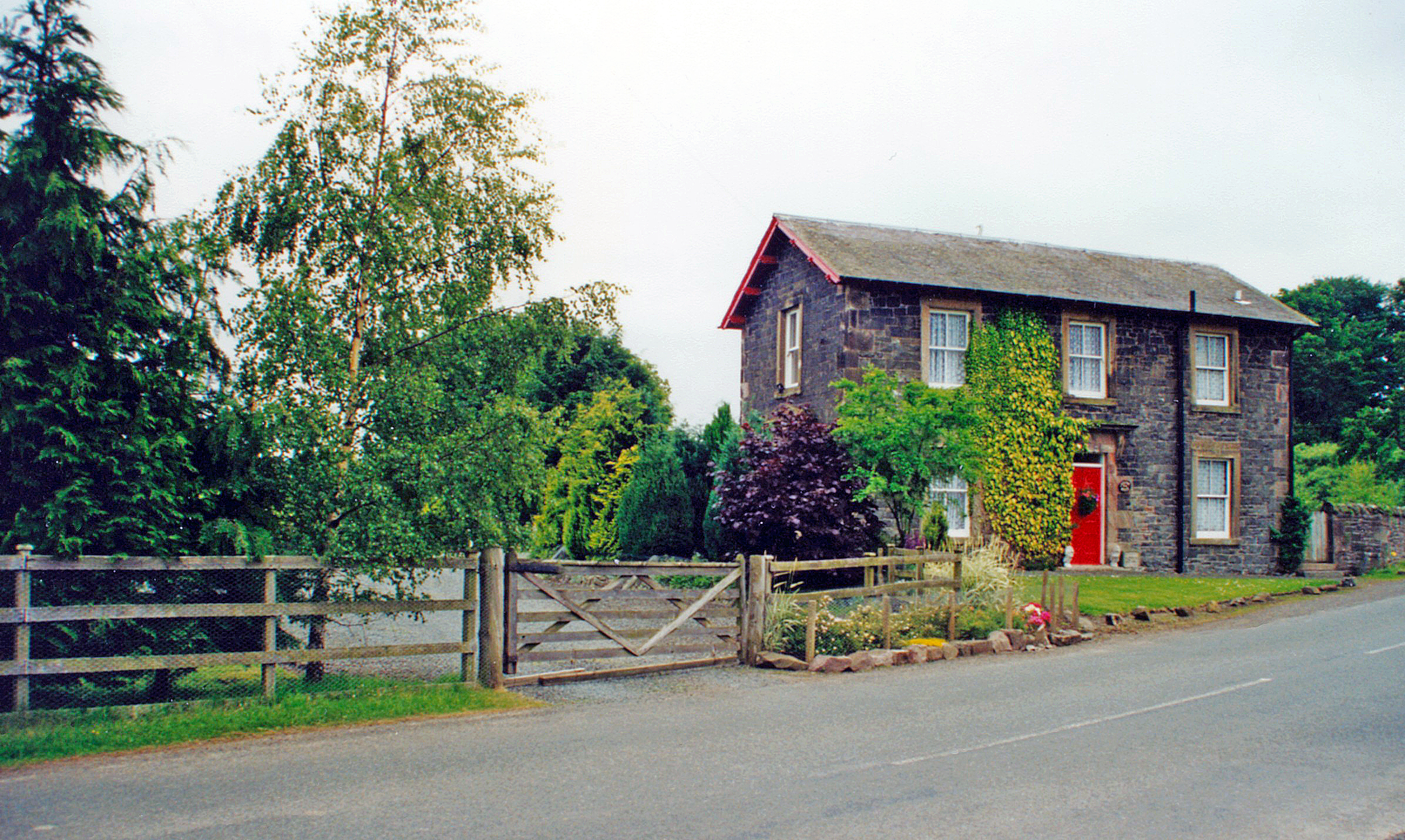
- Remains of the station site, 2000

General information
- Location: Fountainhall, Scottish Borders; Scotland
- Coordinates: 55.738053°N 2.913577°W
- Grid reference: NT427497
- Platforms: 3

Other information
- Status: Disused

History
- Original company: North British Railway
- Pre-grouping: North British Railway
- Post-grouping: LNER

Key dates
- 1 August 1848: Opened as Burnhouse or Fountainhall
- 2 July 1901: Renamed Fountainhall Junction
- 1959: Renamed Fountainhall
- 6 January 1969: Closed
Location

Fountainhall railway station served the village of Fountainhall, Scottish Borders from 1848 to 1969 on the Waverley Route.

== History ==
The station opened as Burnhouse or Fountainhall on 1 August 1848 by the North British Railway. (Note: There is some confusion around the opening of the station. Firstly with the station name which according to Quick (2022) was described as both Burnhouse and Fountainhall in the opening notice, the station appeared in Bradshaw initially as Burnhouse until 1849 when it appeared as Fountainhall. Secondly with the precise date as there are conflicting reports, Quick (2022) notes that a NBR notice published in 'The Scotsman' and 'Bradshaw's Shareholders Guide' both have it as 1 August whereas the shares section of the 'Caledonian Mercury' has it as the 4th) (Note: At times the Railway Clearing House used two words for Fountain Hall as did the NBR on its tickets)

The station was situated on the south side of an unnamed minor road. The goods yard consisted of three sidings with the siding closest to the main line passing through a large goods shed. The yard was equipped with 1¼ ton crane and could handle live stock.

The station became a junction when the Lauder Light Railway was opened on 2 July 1901, the station's name was changed to Fountainhall Junction from this date.

The Lauder branch closed to passengers on 12 September 1932 and to goods on 1 October 1958.

The station was host to a LNER camping coach from 1935 to 1939. A camping coach was also positioned here by the Scottish Region from 1958 to 1960.

The station was still named Fountainhall Junction until April 1959, even though the LNER timetable of 1937 didn't use the 'junction' suffix.

The station was closed to goods on 28 April 1964, with the remaining sidings quickly lifted and was closed to passengers on 6 January 1969

In September 2015, the Waverley Route partially reopened as part of the Borders Railway. Although the railway passes through the original Fountainhall station, it was not reopened.

== Notes ==
| Preceding station | Historical railways | Following station |
|---|---|---|
| Heriot; Line open, station closed | North British Railway; Waverley Route | Stow; Line and station open |
| | Disused railways | |
| Terminus | Lauder Light Railway | Oxton; Line and station closed |
