= Carcant =

Village in Scottish Borders, Scotland

Coordinates: 55.762°N 3.013°W

Carcant, a collection of houses in a secluded glen off Heriot Water

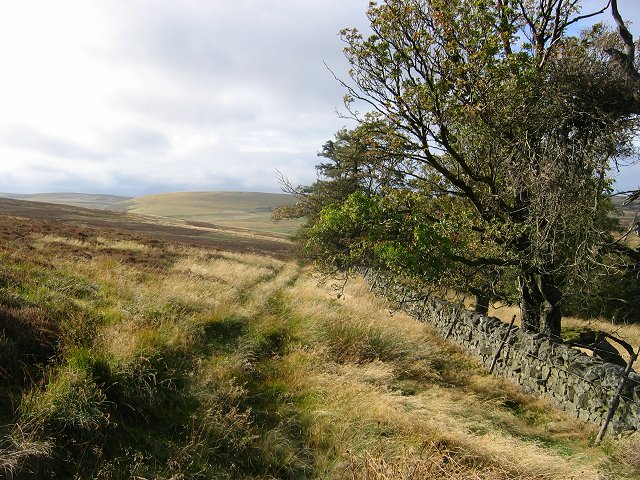
Carcant, old woods

Carcant is a small settlement and a wind farm, near Heriot in the Scottish Borders area of Scotland.

A famous inhabitant of Carcant was Eric Liddell.

== Etymology ==
Carcant is etymologically a Cumbric place-name. The first element is cognate with Welsh caer 'fortification'. The second might be can 'white', in which case the name means 'white fort'; but more likely it is cant 'edge of a circle', in this context probably meaning 'district, region, edge, border', thus giving 'fort of the region/border'.

== See also ==
- Clan Borthwick
- List of places in the Scottish Borders
