= James Thin =

British bookshop chain

James Thin Ltd was a Scottish bookshop chain, founded by James Thin in 1848. Five generations of the Thin family ran the company over the course of its 154-year lifespan. Initially a single store in Edinburgh, the company expanded across Scotland and the United Kingdom with 35 branches. In 2002, following a period of rapid expansion, it went into voluntary administration. Subsequently, most of its shops were acquired in the name of other companies in the book trade.

== Origins ==
The company was founded in 1848 by James Thin (1824–1915). For most its existence the firm traded under Thin's own name, only becoming James Thin Ltd. in the 1970s. Thin had previously worked for 12 years for James McIntosh, a bookseller at 5 North College Street, having joined the firm as an apprentice at the age of eleven.

On 3 April 1848, Thin opened his own shop, at 14 Infirmary Street, having taken over the assets of a Mr Rickard, a bookseller who was in financial difficulties. Thin was 24 at the time. Trade was slow at first, but improved over the next few years. Most of its sales were in the academic market, thanks in part to the shop's location close to Edinburgh University.

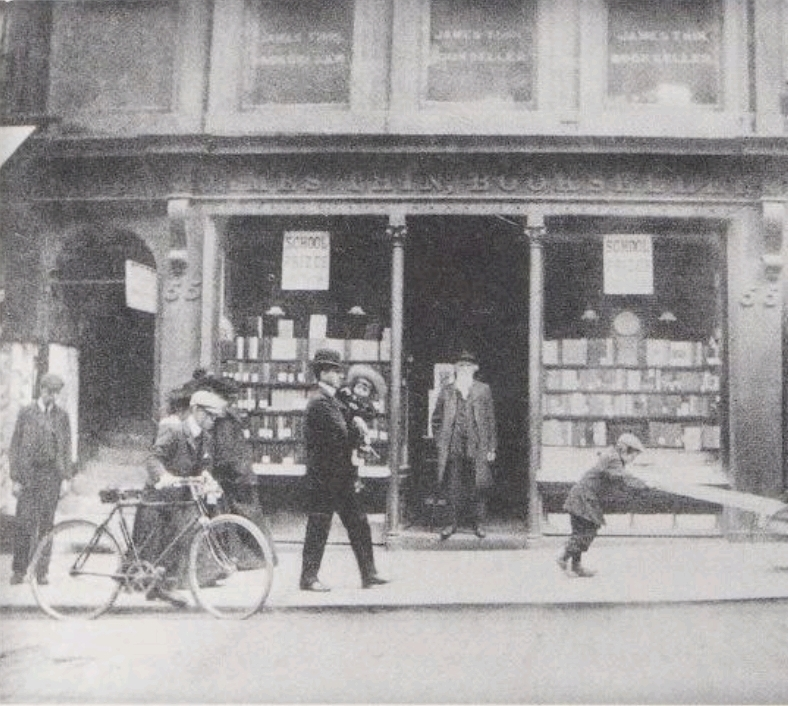
James Thin's bookshop in South Bridge

In 1853, Thin took a lease on two rooms above a neighbouring shop, at 54 South Bridge. The only access to these rooms was by a staircase from the street. Although the rooms were in the same corner block as the Infirmary Street premises, there was no communication between them apart from a speaking tube. Two years later Thin took over an adjacent shop at 55 South Bridge, at which point he gave up the rooms at 54. An opening was built into the back wall of 55 to give access to the Infirmary Street premises.

Trade continued to improve and Thin was soon advertising the business as "the largest retail bookselling establishment in Edinburgh". In 1854, he issued his first catalogue of second-hand books. In 1864, the shop was extended into 15 Infirmary Street, a former tavern.

== Later years ==
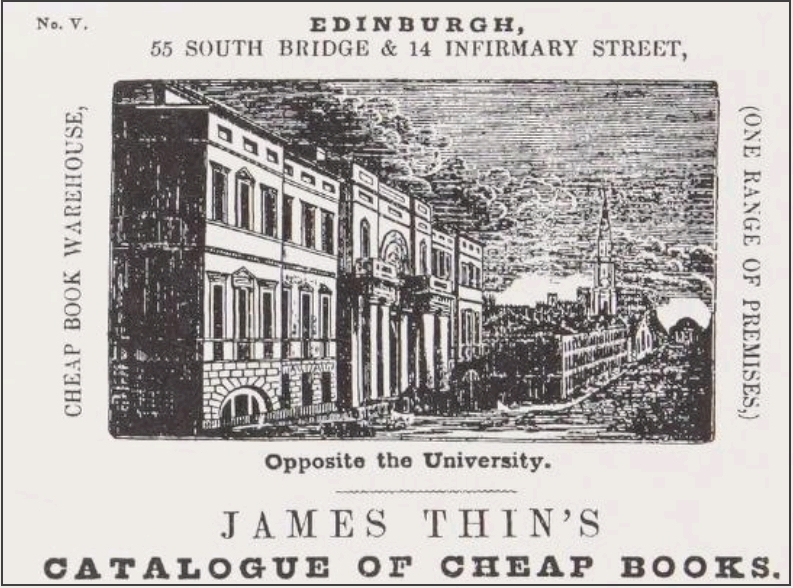
Cover of James Thin's catalogue of second-hand books from 1858

James Thin worked in the business for most of the rest of his life. He was the first of five generations of the Thin family to run the firm. Other prominent family members involved in the business included:

- James Hay Thin (1853–1943). The founder's eldest son. He joined the business in the 1870s and became senior partner in 1880. He was also a director of two publishing houses, Oliver and Boyd and Gurney & Jackson. During his tenure, the firm concentrated on academic and theological books, and on antiquarian and second-hand volumes. The shop further expanded into various rooms and flats in the South Bridge building.
- James Ainslie Thin (1882–1972). James Hay Thin's eldest son. He joined the firm shortly before World War 1, spent two years in a German POW camp, returned to the business after the war and remained until the 1950s.
- Thomas Thin. James Hay Thin's younger son who also worked in the business.
- James Thin (1923–1997), known as Jimmy Thin. J. Ainslie Thin's son. He worked in the firm from 1949 to 1990, during which time he built up the mail order side of the business.
- David Thin (1933-2023), known as Ainslie Thin. Jimmy Thin's cousin. He joined the firm in 1958 and went on to become chairman and managing director, overseeing a period of considerable expansion.
- Jackie Thin. Ainslie Thin's eldest daughter. A qualified chartered accountant, she was finance director and then managing director.
- Hilary Thin. Another of Ainslie Thin's daughters. She was in charge of the chain's Scottish region.
- Jamie Thin. Ainslie Thin's son. With an MSc in computing, he ran the firm's computer systems.

When Jimmy Thin joined the firm in 1949, the business occupied sprawling premises on several floors of the South Bridge / Infirmary Street block. Over the next few years, these separate units were consolidated into a single shop, using 55 South Bridge as its main address. This was to remain the flagship shop and head office for the rest of the firm's existence.

During the second half of the 20th century, the business underwent rapid expansion. It opened new shops and bought existing shops throughout Scotland and England. By 1990, it had grown to a chain of 34 stores, stretching from Inverness to Portsmouth, with an annual turnover of £34 million. In 1994, it purchased the Volume One chain in England for £4 million.

The firm also had interests in publishing. Between 1900 and 1962, it was joint owner (with James Grant, Booksellers) of Oliver and Boyd, a large Edinburgh-based publisher of school books, theological books and literary works. Thin's share of that business was sold in 1962 to pay death duties. In 1970, Jimmy and Ainslie Thin established the Mercat Press imprint, specialising in books with a Scottish interest. It later took over the titles of Aberdeen University Press when that company became insolvent. By 2007, Mercat Press had over 200 titles in its list, these being predominantly works on architecture and heritage as well as guides books and general fiction, the latter category including the novels of crime writer Gillian Galbraith.

== Technology ==
James Thin Ltd was a pioneer in technology and automation. In the mid 1960s, it implemented a computerised stock control system which it claimed was the first of its kind for a UK bookshop. In the 1980s, Ainslie Thin developed a version of the system in dBASE III to run on personal computers within 26 of the shops. In 1998, the company started selling books on line, making it what at the time was described as "the biggest on-line bookseller in the world". It was also the first bookseller to use the Whitaker TeleOrdering system

== Decline and administration ==
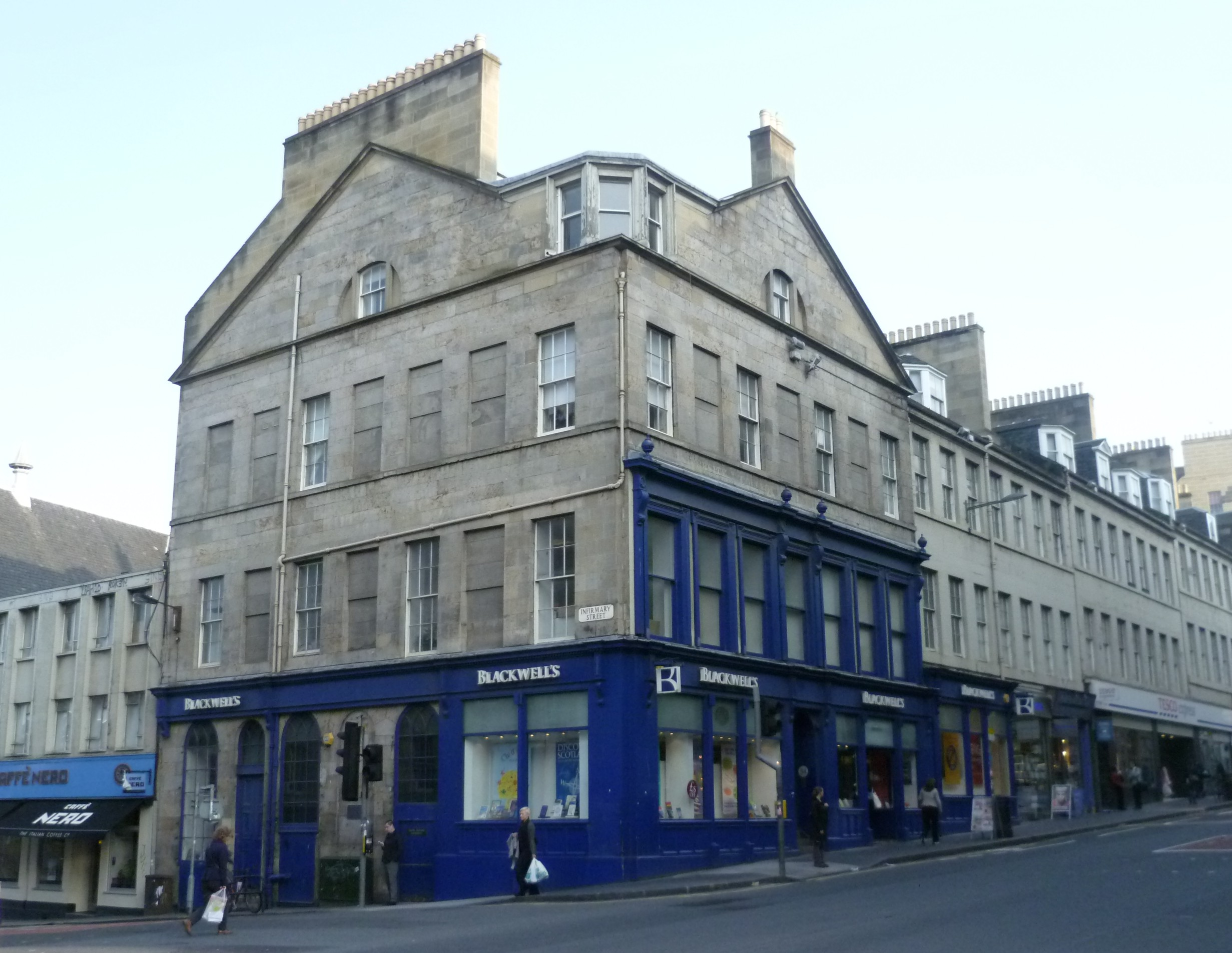
The former premises of James Thin, now Blackwell's Bookshop, South Bridge, Edinburgh.

James Thin Ltd.'s annual turnover remained at about £35 million throughout the 1990s, but then declined rapidly. For the year to 31 January 2001, the firm reported a pre-tax loss of £116,000 on sales of £26.8 million. In January 2002, it went into voluntary administration, with debts of £5 million. Jackie Thin, the managing director, blamed the collapse on increased competition, falling turnover and the cost of closing loss-making shops. According to press comments, the rapid expansion into England and in particular the acquisition of Volume One were major factors in the chain's failure.

PricewaterhouseCoopers was appointed as administrator to run the chain and realise its assets. It immediately made 60 staff redundant at the head office and in 28 of the branches. It then announced that it expected to sell the entire business, having received ten approaches from prospective buyers.

In March 2002, Ottakar's purchased eight of the company's general bookstores for £1.64 million, with no redundancies expected. These shops had a combined annual turnover of £10.1 million. Ottakar's was itself taken over by Waterstones in 2006.

In April 2002, Blackwell UK announced the purchase of Thin's twelve academic bookshops for "in excess of" £2 million, with all of the 102 staff retaining their jobs. The purchase included branches at St Andrews University, the University of Edinburgh, Heriot-Watt University, and Napier University as well as the South Bridge shop and stores at six other sites. Between them, these branches had an annual turnover of £7 million. Blackwell's also announced a £1.5 million refurbishment for the South Bridge shop.

Thin's publishing arm, Mercat Press, continued to trade as an independent entity following a management buy-out. In 2007, it was taken over by Birlinn, which continues to use the Mercat imprint.
