= Stow railway station =

Railway station in Scottish Borders, Scotland

Stow
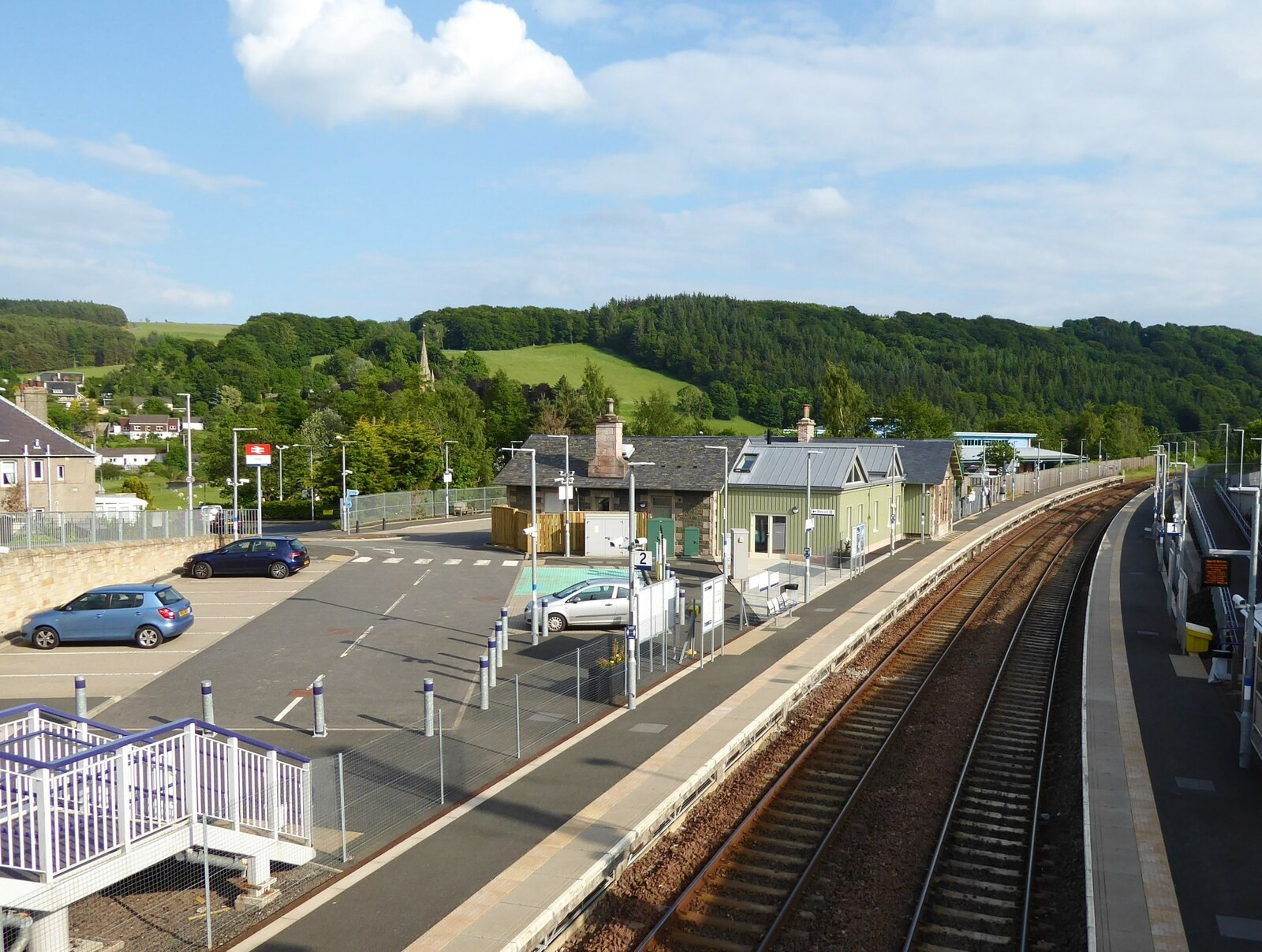

General information
- Location: Stow of Wedale, Scottish Borders; Scotland
- Coordinates: 55°41′30″N 2°52′00″W
- Grid reference: NT456446
- Owner: Network Rail
- Manager: ScotRail
- Platforms: 2

Other information
- Station code: SOI

History
- Original company: Edinburgh and Hawick Railway
- Pre-grouping: North British Railway
- Post-grouping: London and North Eastern Railway; British Rail (Scottish Region)

Key dates
- 1 November 1848: Opened
- 6 January 1969: Closed
- 6 September 2015: Reopened

Passengers
- 2020/21: ▼8,272
- 2021/22: ▲43,258
- 2022/23: ▲59,806
- 2023/24: ▲75,818
- 2024/25: ▼74,988
Location
- Location within Scottish Borders
Notes
- Passenger statistics from the Office of Rail and Road

Stow is a railway station on the Borders Railway, which runs between Edinburgh Waverley and Tweedbank. The station, situated 26 miles 45 chains (43 km) south-east of Edinburgh Waverley, serves the town of Lauder and village of Stow of Wedale in Scottish Borders, Scotland. It is owned by Network Rail and managed by ScotRail.

== History ==
The original station at Stow was opened by the North British Railway on 1 November 1848. Some timetables described the station as Stow for Lauder. It was closed by British Rail on 6 January 1969.

Although Stow was not originally part of the reopening plans, the station (and the line) reopened on 6 September 2015. The new construction work was undertaken by BAM Nuttall. The station has two platforms, each of which can accommodate an eight coach train.

== Services ==
As of the May 2023 timetable change, the station is served by a half hourly service between Edinburgh Waverley and Tweedbank. Previously some peak time trains continued to Glenrothes with Thornton. All services are operated by ScotRail.

Rolling stock used: Class 158 Express Sprinter and Class 170 Turbostar

Preceding station	National Rail	Following station
Gorebridge	ScotRail; Borders Railway	Galashiels
	Historical railways	
Fountainhall	North British Railway; Waverley Route	Bowland
