= Oliver and Boyd =

British publishing firm

- Status: Defunct
- Founded: 1807 or 1808
- Founder: Thomas Oliver and George Boyd
- Country of origin: United Kingdom
- Headquarters location: Edinburgh
- Publication types: Educational, scientific and medical books

Oliver and Boyd was a British publishing and printing firm that traded from 1807 or 1808 until 1990. The firm has been described as a "stalwart in Scottish publishing".

== History ==
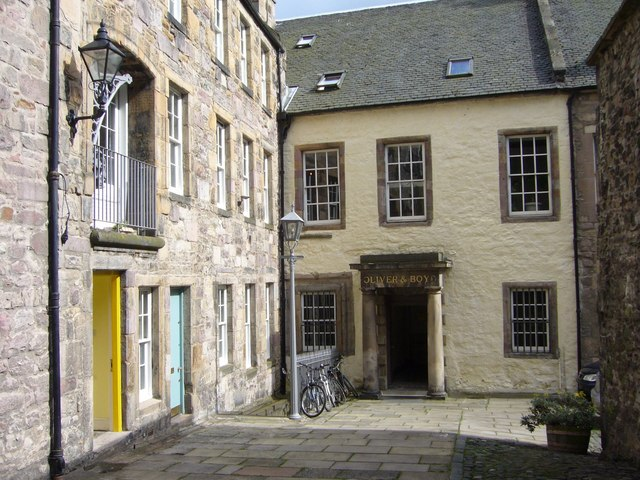
Building on Tweeddale Court

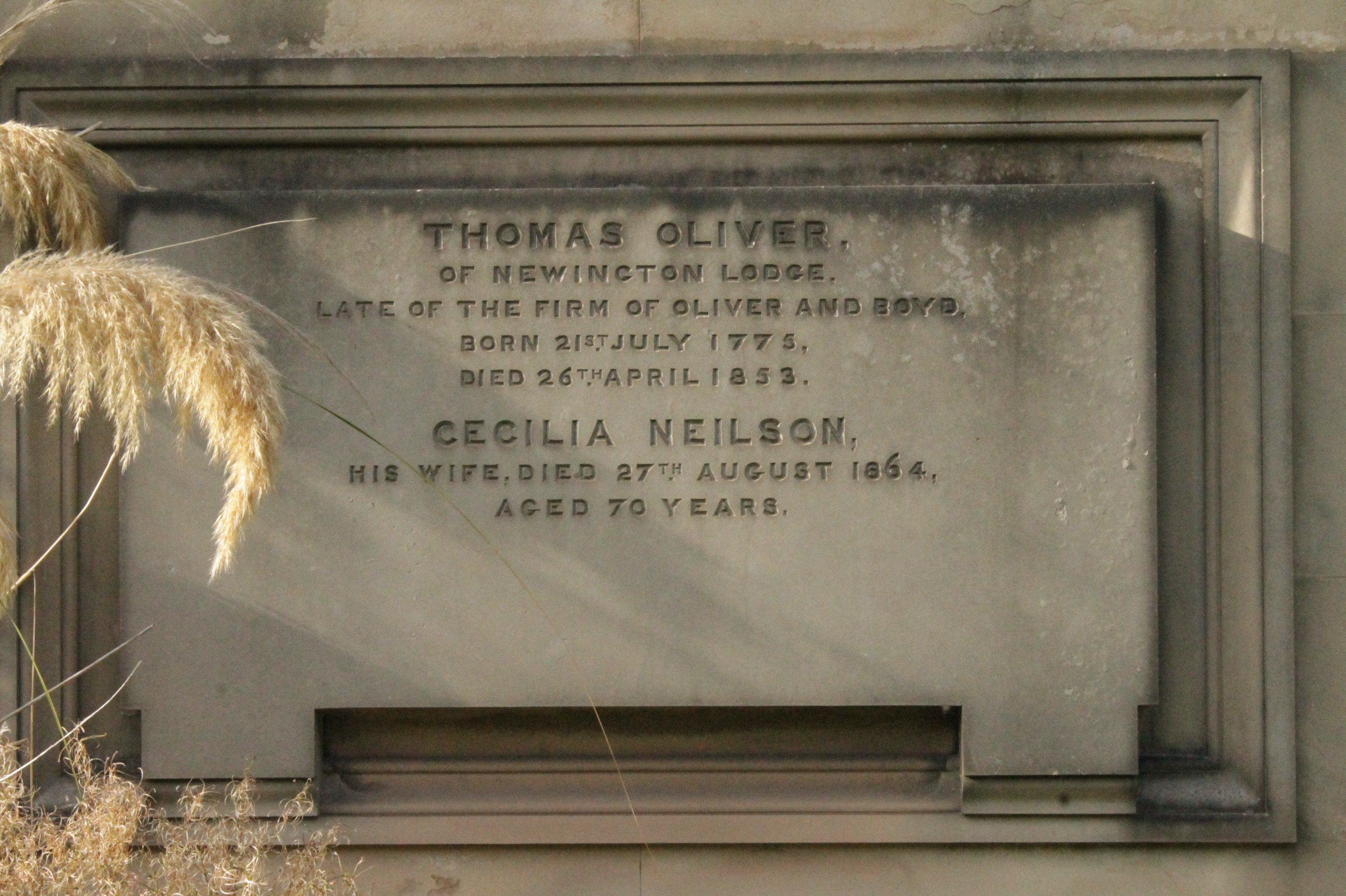
The grave of Thomas Oliver, Grange Cemetery

Oliver and Boyd was founded in Edinburgh by two partners: Thomas Oliver (1775–1853) and George Boyd (died 1843). The exact foundation year is not known but is believed to have been either 1807 or 1808.

The firm operated from the 1820s until the 1970s at the same address in Tweeddale Court, near the Royal Mile in Edinburgh (the old "Oliver and Boyd" sign remains above the front door of the Tweeddale Court building to this day). It was one of the "auld" firms to survive in the area after the crash of 1825–26.

By the 1830s, the firm was not only publishing but also printing and bookbinding under the same roof at Tweeddale Court, an innovative practice for Edinburgh in that period. By 1836, the firm carried out printing there on a "massive scale". Prior to Oliver & Boyd, printing and publishing in Scotland had been a cottage industry with the printing done on wooden presses and it was only in 1800 that the iron press had been invented.

In the years 1811–1841, Oliver and Boyd issued a number of catalogues for the firm's juvenile books "selling from a halfpenny upwards" and also printed and published "abridged histories in fancy covers and songbooks".

When Thomas Oliver retired and George Boyd died in 1843, the firm remained under family control with George's nephew Thomas Jamieson Boyd being appointed as managing partner in 1843 and then acting as senior partner from 1869 to 1894. In this period the firm gained a reputation in the fields of education and medical textbook publishing and had a strong presence in the British colonial markets. When Benjamin Disraeli visited the firm in 1885 he found the firm did 'everything but making paper'. They were printers, publishers and binders.

In 1896, Oliver and Boyd was taken over by three "well-established" Edinburgh booksellers, George and James Thin and John Grant.

During the 20th century, the firm maintained its reputation as "educational and general publishers of high standing".

In 1962, the firm was acquired by the Financial Times group and, later, Longmans acquired its publishing operations. In 1984, a public library known as the Scottish Poetry Library was set up in what had previously been a storage area of Oliver and Boyd's Tweeddale Court offices. Oliver and Boyd ceased operations in 1990.

== Book series ==
- Biography and Criticism Series
- Edinburgh Cabinet Library (published jointly with Simpkin & Marshall)
- Modern Writers Series
- Oliver & Boyd Quest Library
- Self-Study English Series
- Signpost Library
- University Mathematical Texts
- The Wide Range Readers
- Writers and Critics
