= Lauder Light Railway =

Former railway line in Scotland

The Lauder Light Railway was a railway line opened in 1901 to connect the remote agricultural settlement of Lauder in Berwickshire with the main line of the Waverley Route railway at Fountainhall. Traffic was never heavy and bus competition led to closure to passengers in 1932. Goods traffic might not have survived but a Food Buffer Depot (to provide emergency food rations in wartime) was established at Lauder during World War II and the rail-borne traffic sustained the line for some years. It closed finally in 1958 and little now remains, though bits of the formation, including embankments and cuttings, are visible at Middletoun.

== History ==
=== First proposals ===
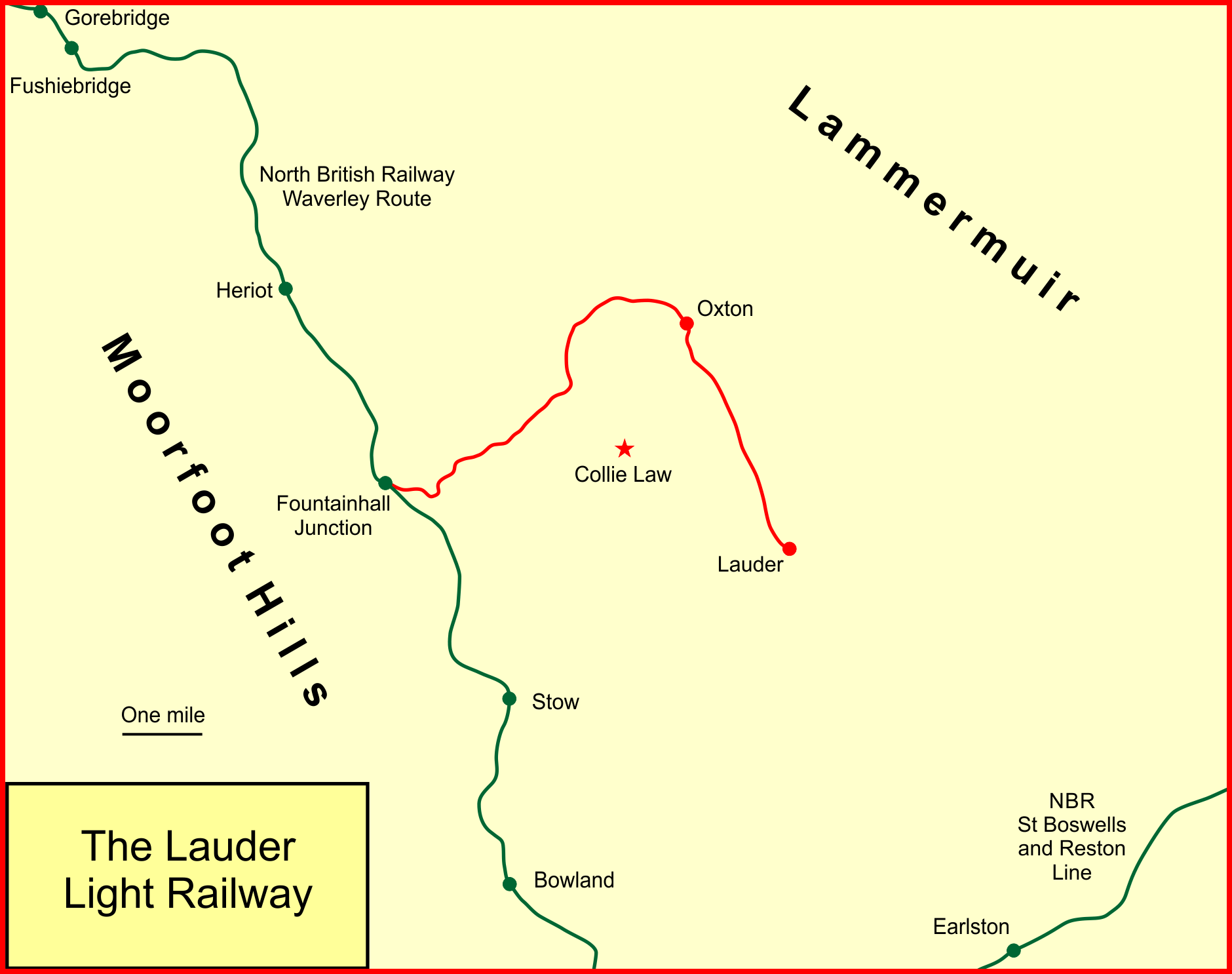
System map of the Lauder Light Railway

In the nineteenth century Lauder was in a remote location; there was no industry other than agriculture.

In 1846 the Berwickshire Central Railway was proposed, following the Lauder Railway route as actually built and continuing to Earlston and Kelso, but there was no support for the company and it collapsed.

In 1848 the line which became the Waverley Route reached Fountainhall from Edinburgh; it had been authorised as the Edinburgh and Hawick Railway but was adopted by the North British Railway. In due course the through route to Carlisle was formed.

Encouraged by the proximity of a main line, a public meeting took place in April 1852 for a Lauder branch railway from the Fountainhall line; there was local support for a line, but no subscriptions were forthcoming and the scheme was forgotten. There were further schemes in 1870 and 1883, also without any positive outcome.

A horse-drawn omnibus service was operated later over the hills to Stow railway station; it was privately operated but subsidised by the North British Railway. There was no other public transport except a weekly carrier to Dalkeith and another weekly carrier to Galashiels.

=== Light railway legislation ===
In December 1895 there was strong local agitation for a modern road between Oxton and Fountainhall; the negative response from the county council encouraged resumed thoughts of a railway once more, and this was encouraged by the passage of the Light Railways Act 1896. This was designed to encourage the construction of local railway connections without the expense of seeking an Act of Parliament or the safety arrangements of main lines.

On 15 December 1896 the promoters – two local landowners – issued a formal notice issued pursuant to a light railway order for the "Lauder Light Railway". The capital was to be £45,000 and an application was made to Berwickshire County Council for a grant not exceeding £15,000. The estimated cost of construction was £48,308.

The administrative procedure for issuing the required order was very much delayed, but on 30 June 1898 the Lauder Light Railway Order 1898 was issued.

A contract was concluded with Dick Kerr & Co for £34,151 to build the line, with an additional £5,660 for providing the permanent way. The North British Railway subscribed £15,000 of shares, Berwickshire County Council £12,000, (Note: Hadjucki; Ross says £12,000 and Lauder Town Council £3,000.) Dick Kerr accepted £2,500 in shares as part payment.

Work started on 3 June 1899: the Countess of Lauderdale cut the first sod at Lauder.

There were considerable difficulties between the company and the North British Railway, who had agreed to work the line, over permanent way specifications and facilities at the stations.

=== The line opens ===
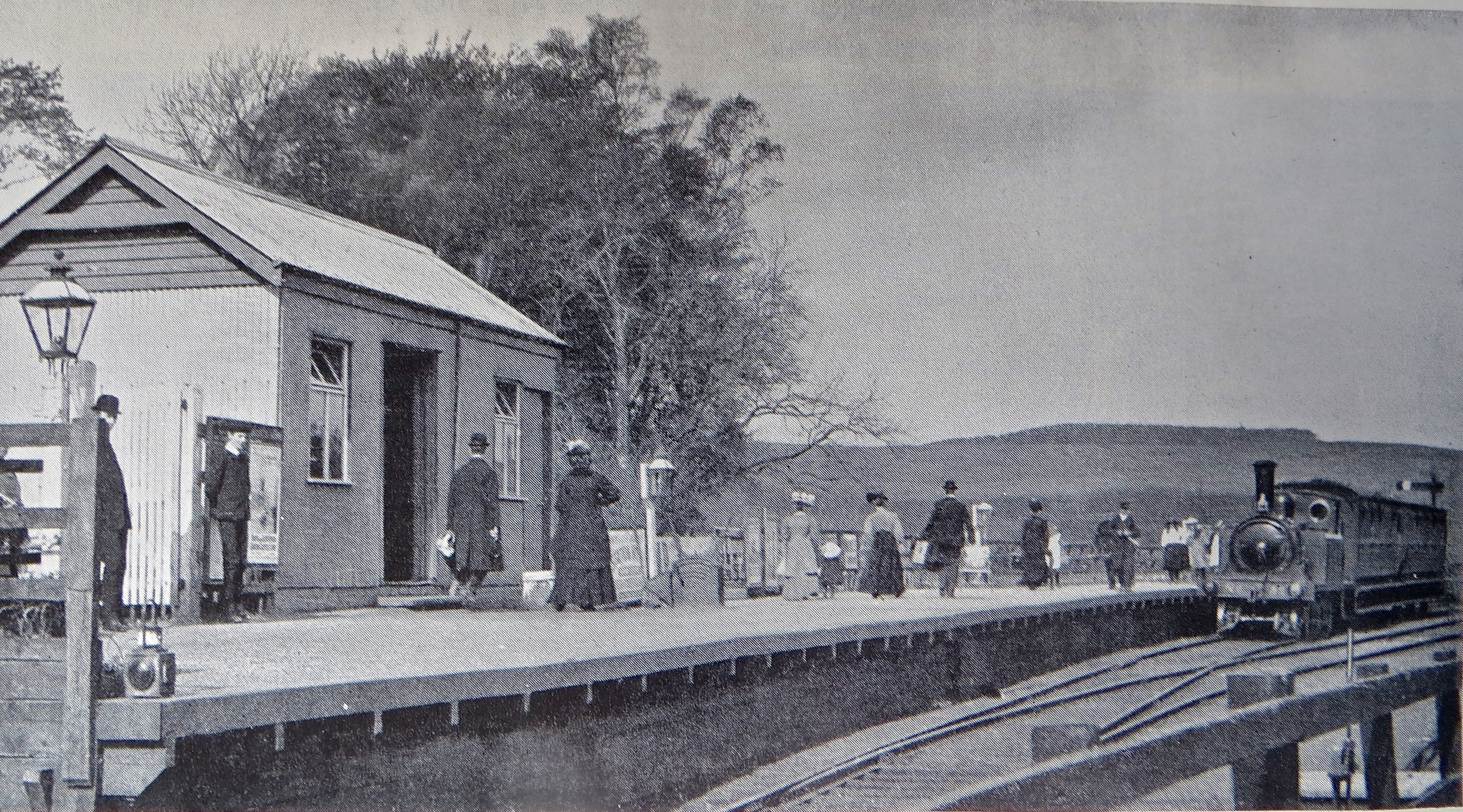
North British 4-4-0 No. 52 at Lauder, soon after it opened on 2 July 1901

Major Pringle of the Board of Trade inspected the line on 28 June 1901 and found it fit for passenger operation, and the line opened on 2 July 1901. The North British Railway worked the line. The line was actually built for £39,811. It was the first light railway in Scotland. (Note: The Carmyllie Railway, near Arbroath, started passenger operation under the Light Railway legislation on 1 February 1900, but it was a long-standing mineral line on which passenger running was then started.)

There were four passenger trains each way daily; there was never a Sunday service. There was one intermediate passenger station, at Oxton.

Shortly after opening, the NBR complained that the cattle dock was unsatisfactory. Cattle had previously been walked to St Boswells for onward rail transport to Newcastle and the NBR emphasised that the rate for the carriage of cattle to Newcastle would need to be pitched carefully to attract the traffic.

The short line was of local interest only, and the income from the first three months of operation after deduction of the NBR operation charges was £383.

The line certainly encouraged visitors to the area; a new temperance hotel opened in Lauder at the time of opening of the railway, and at Oxton the Tower Hotel opened in 1903. Trout fishing was a noted activity locally and was facilitated by the opening of the line.

=== Later history ===
In 1913 the Lauder Light Railway sought a takeover by the North British Railway, but this was refused by the NBR, which had considerable financial commitments at the time.

In 1923 the main line railways of Great Britain were grouped under the Railways Act 1921 and the Lauder Light Railway became part of the new London and North Eastern Railway (LNER). At the end of independent existence in 1922 the company's receipts amounted to £1,362 (goods £785, third class passengers £266).

The grouping settlement of 1923 exchanged £15,000 of LNER preferred ordinary stock for the £47,090 of Lauder Light Railway stock, with the LNER accepting liability for Lauder loans of £13,500. The company had paid a dividend of 1.25% to 1,5% during its independent existence.

In 1924 the first bus service to Edinburgh was started, and by 1931 the loss of passenger traffic to buses was extreme: the revenue for the year 1931 – 1932 was £466, and closure to passengers became inevitable. Closure to passenger traffic was fixed for 10 September 1932, and the last passenger train ran on that day. A low level of goods traffic continued for the time being.

The engine shed at Lauder was closed after termination of the passenger service and latterly line was worked by J67 0-6-0 locomotives from Galashiels with tenders attached. The tenders allowed the locomotives to run with their water tanks empty, keeping the total axle loading below the line's limit.

=== New traffic ===
Decline looked inevitable, until during World War II a Ministry of Food buffer depot was established at Lauder. The depot contained emergency basic food staples - chiefly flour - to be distributed to the civilian population in the event of non-availability of food in an emergency. The poor road network in the area ensured that the supplies were brought to Lauder by rail, and this continued in later years.

In August 1948 there were extreme rainfall conditions in this area of Scotland; there was torrential rain, climaxing on 12 August 1948, and there were serious landslips near the Gala Water bridge. The line was temporarily closed, but it reopened on 20 November 1950. The Food Buffer Depot was still in existence because of concerns in the Cold War.

However the decline of ordinary goods services and a review of the need for the Food Buffer Depot resulted in total closure of the branch line; the last goods train ran on 30 September 1958. The line was totally closed, but an enthusiasts' excursion train organised by the Branch Line Society visited the line on 15 November 1958.

== Topography ==
The line opened on 2 July 1901 and passenger services ceased on 10 September 1932; the line was officially closed completely after 30 September 1958.

The topography of the area forced the line to reach Lauder from Fountainhall in a wide northward sweep around Collie Law, following the Leader Water from Oxton. The line climbed at 1 in 50 from the junction at Fountainhall up to summit at 2.5 miles, then falling at 1 in 50 / 1 in 134 to the 8 milepost, then undulating. The line was 10 miles (16 km) long.

Locations on the route were:

- Fountainhall Junction; junction station on the Waverley Route; the junction was facing for southbound trains; the station had been opened as Burn House and renamed Fountainhall; the "Junction" suffix was added during the years of passenger operation on the branch and the name reverted to Fountainhall in April 1959.
- Middleton siding;
- Hartside siding;
- Oxton;
- Lauder.
