= Oxton, Scottish Borders =

Village in Scottish Borders, Scotland

Coordinates: 55.772°N 2.803°W

Oxton
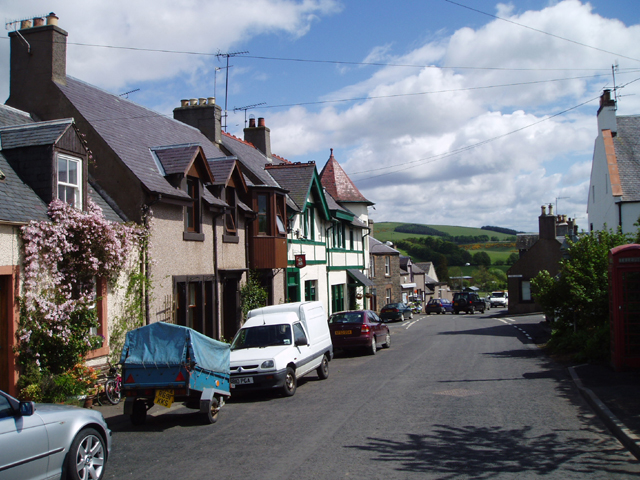
- Village centre

- Location within the Scottish Borders
- Population: 270 (2001)
- OS grid reference: NT496535
  - Edinburgh: 20 mi (32 km) NW
- Civil parish: Channelkirk
- Community council: Oxton and Channelkirk
- Council area: Scottish Borders
- Lieutenancy area: Roxburgh, Ettrick and Lauderdale
- Country: Scotland
- Sovereign state: United Kingdom
- Post town: LAUDER
- Postcode district: TD2
- Dialling code: 01578
- Police: Scotland
- Fire: Scottish
- Ambulance: Scottish
- UK Parliament: Berwickshire, Roxburgh and Selkirk
- Scottish Parliament: Midlothian South, Tweeddale and Lauderdale

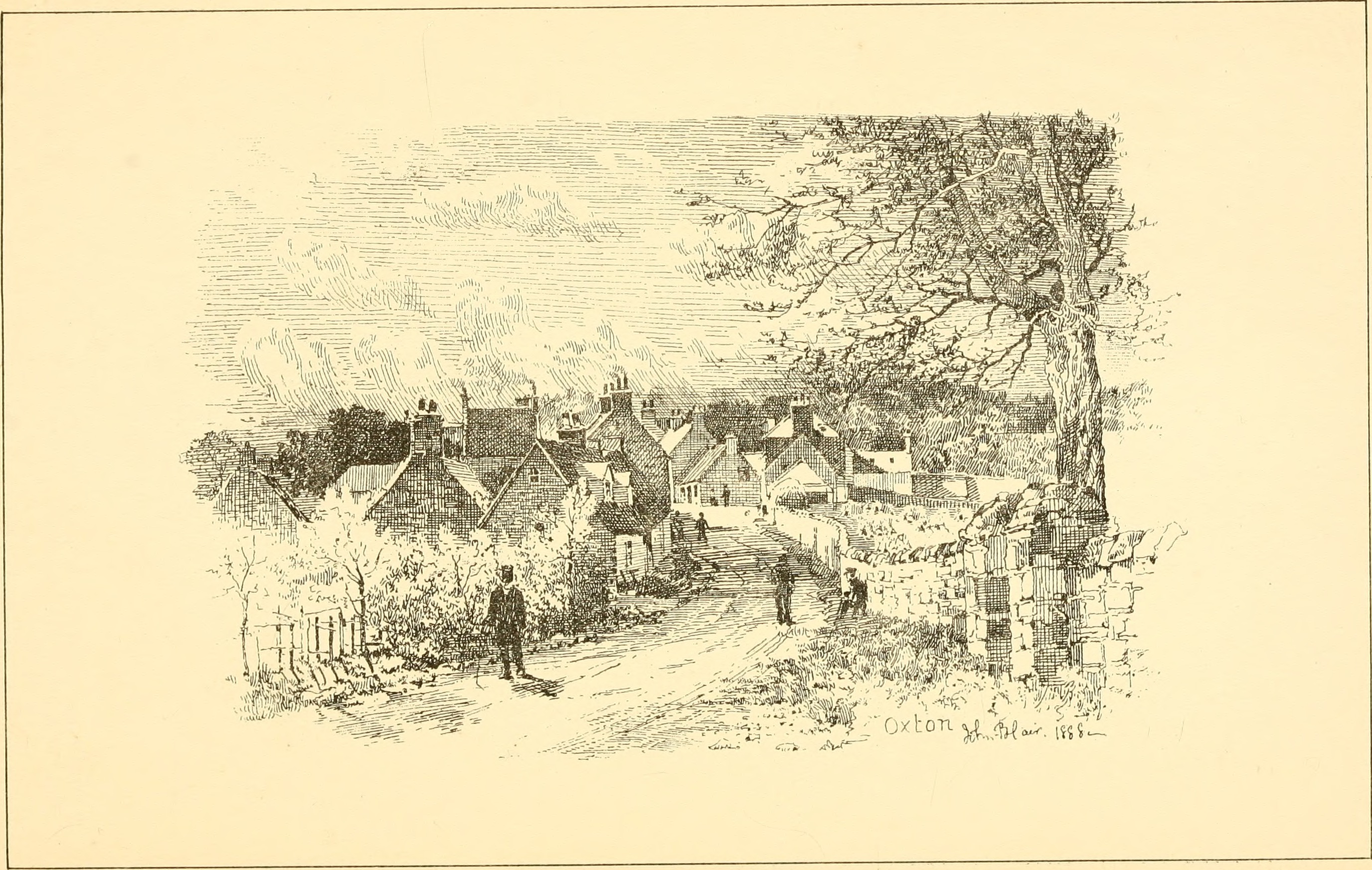
Oxton in the late 19th century

Oxton is a small rural village in the Scottish Borders area of Scotland, just off the A68. It is 4 1/2 miles (7 kilometres) north of Lauder, and 20 mi (32 km) southeast of the centre of Edinburgh, in a quiet rural position.

== History ==
The village of Oxton lies in the parish of Channelkirk. This name for the parish appears to have come into general use in the district around the beginning of the eighteenth century but its ancient name was Childer-kirk and later Gingle-kirk. A Roman camp, visible from the air, and recorded on Ordnance survey maps has been identified nearby and may have been connected with the progress of the army of Septimius Severus in AD 209–210. Saint Cuthbert, who became Bishop of Lindisfarne, was born in the vicinity in AD 635, and probably baptised his early converts at the nearby Holy Water Cleuch (spring).

The village Oxton was called Ugston for several hundred years and appears under that name as late as the 1841 census. As with all Scottish parishes its inhabitants were ruled by a combination of the Kirk Session and the Heritors, the latter being local landowners who were jointly responsible for funding all projects in the parish such as repairs or extensions to the church, the manse, the school, the churchyard, the schoolmaster's house, and even the river bridges, all out of their own pockets.

The village now hosts Bird Gardens Scotland CIC, a bird conservation breeding centre and home to over 300 birds from around the world, including Chilean flamingos, Laughing Kookaburra, and Emu, as well as other animals such as Red-Necked Wallaby and Castlemilk Moorit Sheep. The gardens share the site with Oxton Pottery, a working pottery with regular classes and a gift shop.

== Notable people ==
- Jack Lowden, actor

== Gallery ==
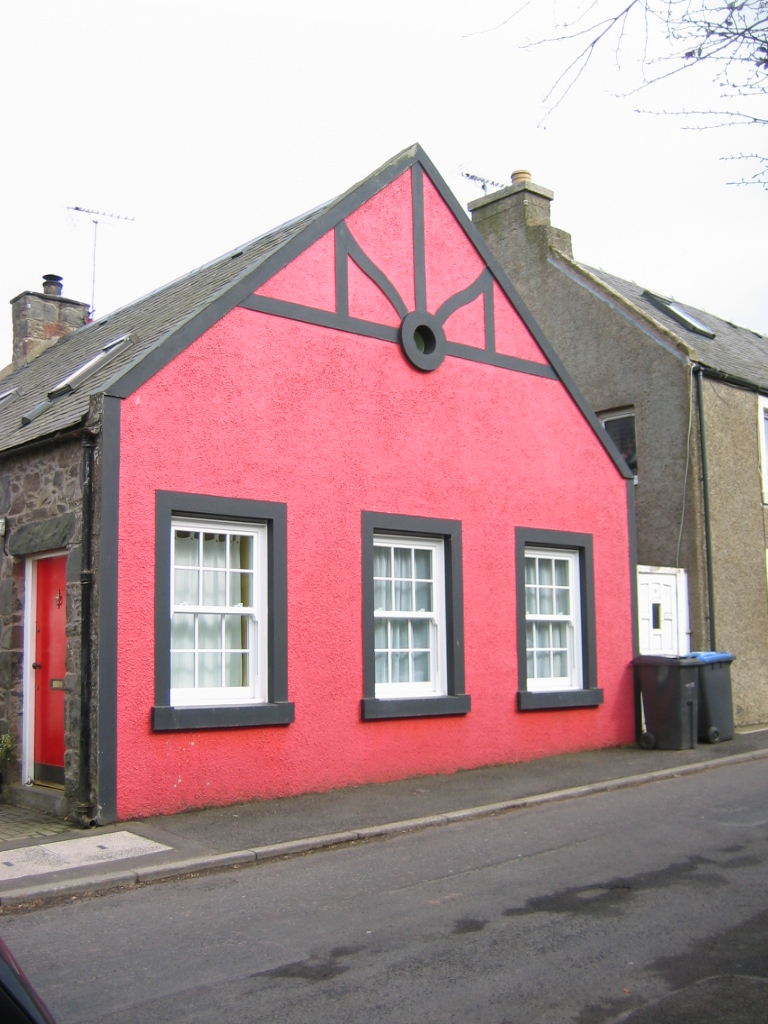
Red house at Oxton

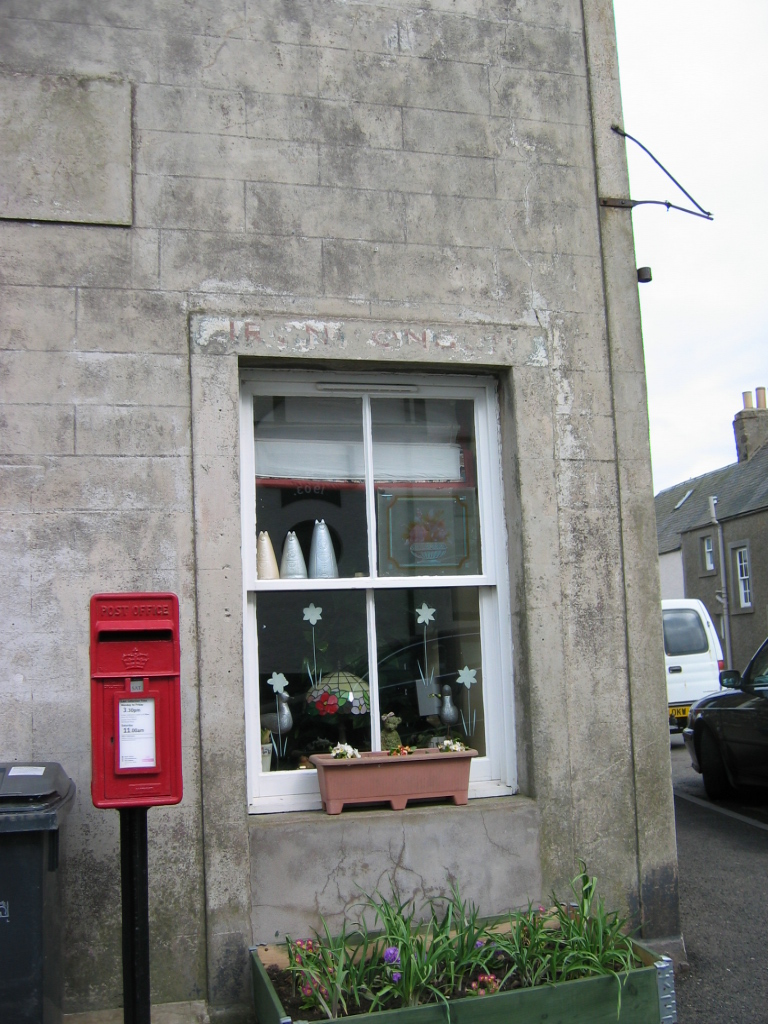
Oxton house and post box

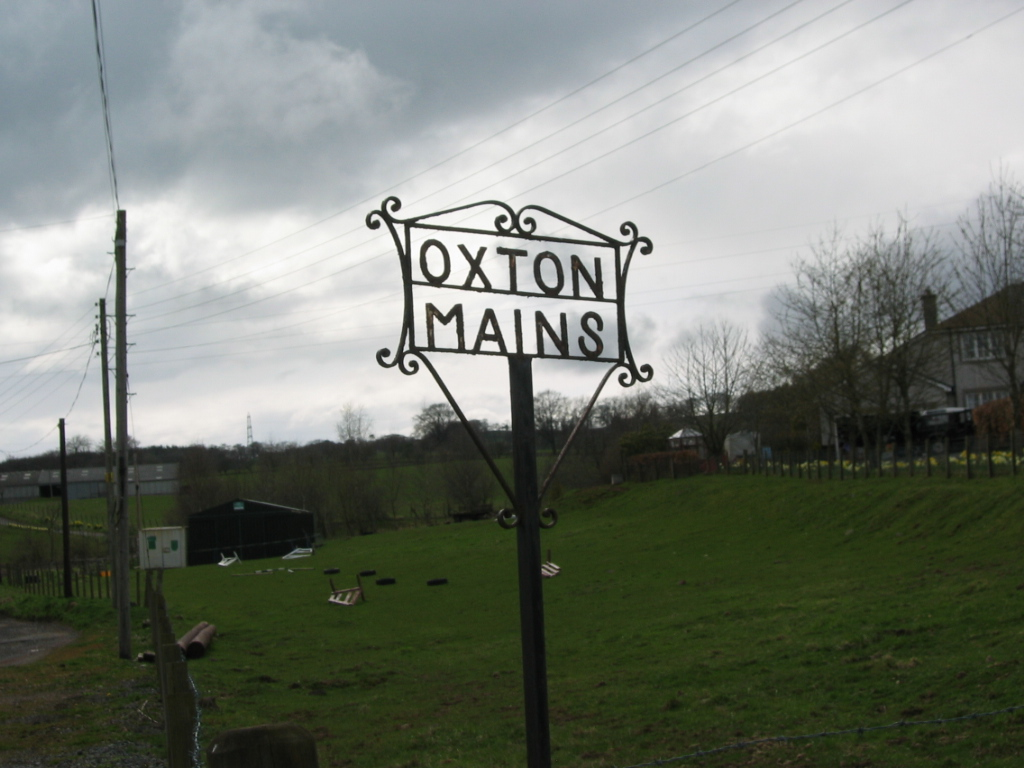
Oxton Mains farm

== See also ==
- Addinston
- List of places in the Scottish Borders
- List of places in East Lothian
