= Stow of Wedale =

Coordinates: 55.692°N 2.862°W

Stow
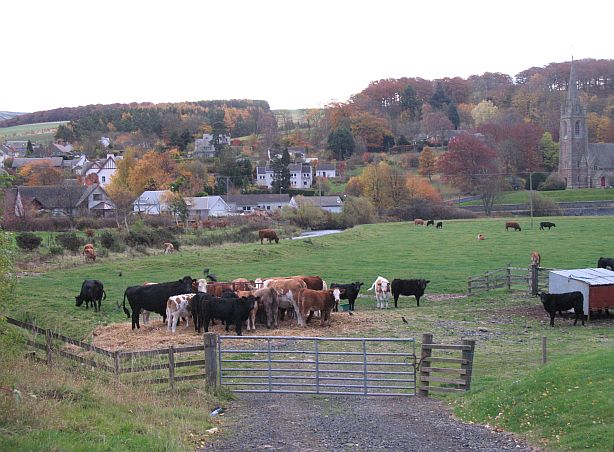

- Location within the Scottish Borders
- Population: 700 (2020)
- OS grid reference: NT456447
- Council area: Scottish Borders
- Lieutenancy area: Roxburgh, Ettrick and Lauderdale
- Country: Scotland
- Sovereign state: United Kingdom
- Post town: GALASHIELS
- Postcode district: TD1
- Dialling code: 01578
- Police: Scotland
- Fire: Scottish
- Ambulance: Scottish
- UK Parliament: Berwickshire, Roxburgh and Selkirk
- Scottish Parliament: Midlothian South, Tweeddale and Lauderdale

Stow of Wedale, or more often Stow, /ˈstaʊ/ is a village in the Scottish Borders area of Scotland (historically in Midlothian), 7 miles (11 kilometres) north of Galashiels. In the 2011 Census the population was 718. It is served by Stow railway station.

== The name ==
The name Stow is an Old English word stōw meaning 'holy place' or 'meeting place', whilst Wedale is probably derived from the words wēoh (or wīg) meaning 'shrine' and dæl meaning 'valley'.

== History ==
According to legend, Stow was the site of one of the battles in which King Arthur defeated the Saxons.

There has been a church at Stow since the 7th century, but the earliest example still visible today was built in the late 15th century on the site of the Church of St Mary which was consecrated on 3 November 1242. The church used today, St Mary of Wedale, was built in 1876 and features a 140-foot-high clock tower.

A mile or so north of Stow lies the clachan of Torquhan, likely in the 13th century to have been one of the last places where the Brittonic language Cumbric was finally replaced by English.

Our Lady's Well is situated 1 mile (2 kilometres) south of the village and was rebuilt in 2000. This is one of the oldest holy wells associated with the Virgin Mary in Scotland.

A rare example of a packhorse bridge, built in the 1650s, can be found in Stow.

Stow of Wedale Town Hall was completed in 1857.

In 1870, James Thin purchased a plot of land in the village and had a house built which was completed in 1873 and was named Ashlea. This house is still a private residence but is not owned by the Thin family.

The Parish of Stow and Fountainhall is part of the Galashiels and District ward of Scottish Borders Council area. Within Stow is Stow Primary School and Nursery, a health centre, and a post office with shop. There is a café, and a bookshop, and a further bar with café at the railway station. Sports include Stow Bowling Club, Stow Amateur Football Club and Stow Cycle Hub.

== Famous residents ==
- Sir John Rose Cormack (1815–1882), born and raised in Stow
- George Darling (physician) (1782?–1862), physician
- Sir Walter Mercer FRSE (1890–1971) orthopaedic surgeon

== Gallery ==
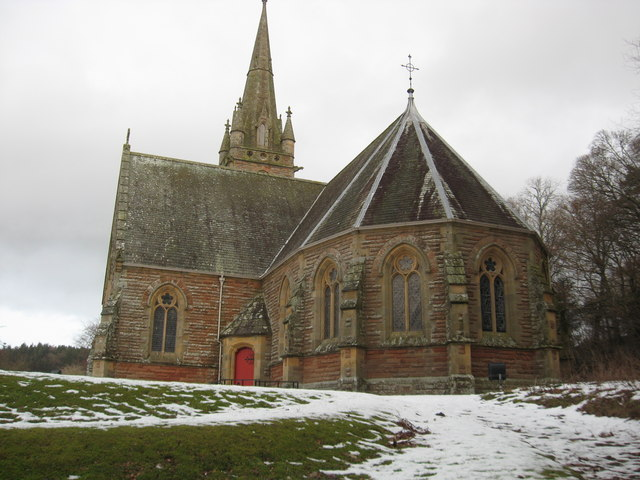
St. Mary's of Wedale Parish Church

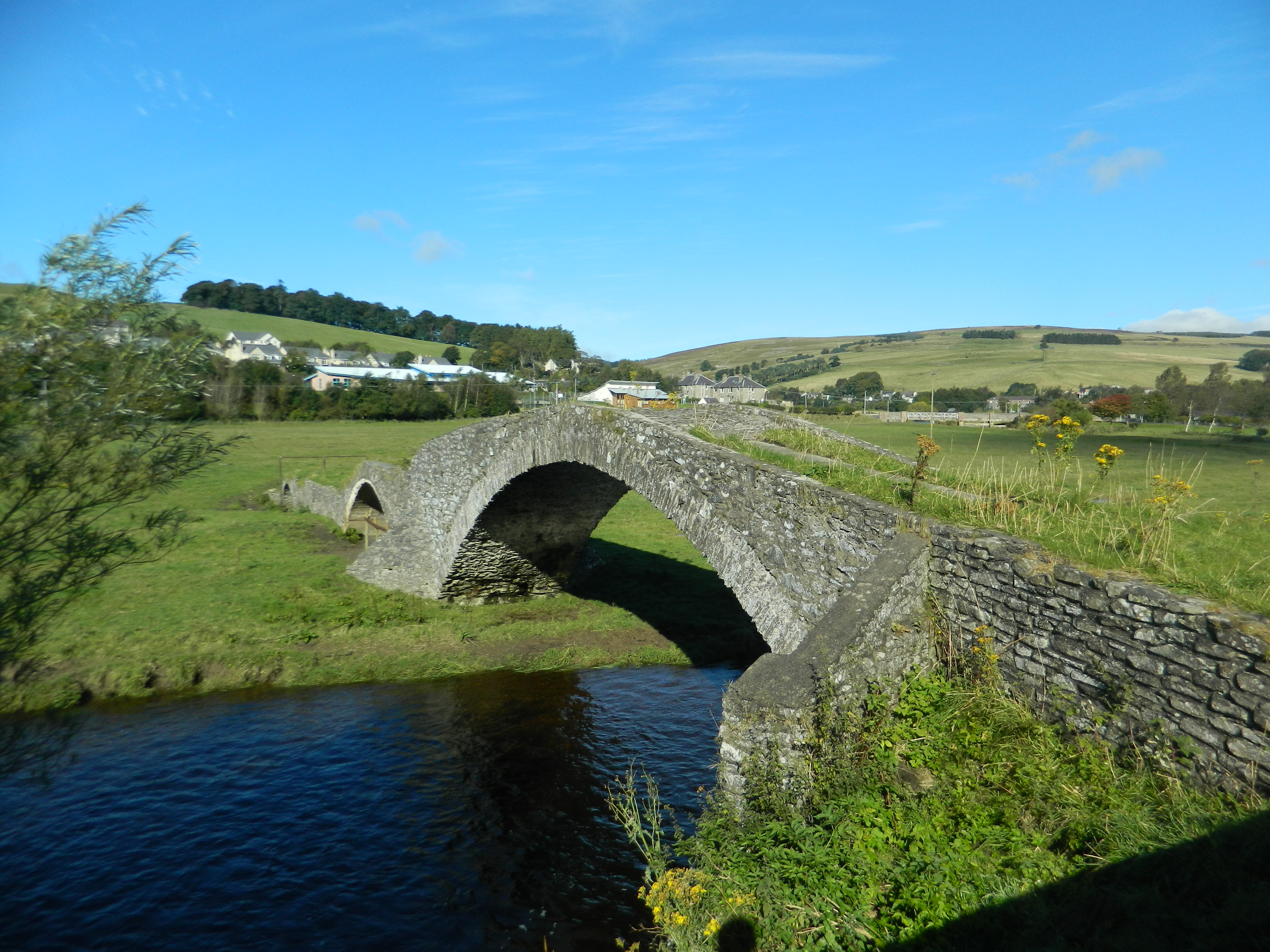
Pack horse bridge across the Gala Water, at the south end of Stow

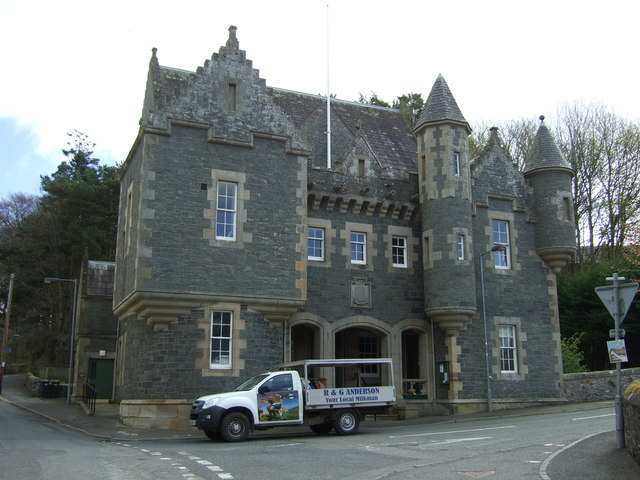
Stow of Wedale Town Hall

== See also ==
- Addinston, Carcant
- List of places in the Scottish Borders
- List of places in Scotland
- Stow railway station

== Sources ==
- E-book on "Celtic Saints and Ancient churches of Strathearn
- RCAHMS record of Stow, Wedale View, General
- Historic Environment Scotland record of Old Stow Kirk and Churchyard
- Scottish Churches Architectural Heritage Trust, grants awarded
- PDF: An excavation at the Bishop's House, Stow, Scottish Borders
- Ordnance Gazetteer of Scotland (extracts).
- Killochyett: Stow of Wedale
- A History of Stow Church
- Pictures around Stow
