= Proposals for new tram lines in Edinburgh =

Various studies, from 1989 onwards, considered the reintroduction of trams to Edinburgh. In 2001, a proposal for a new Edinburgh Trams network envisaged three routes across the city, Lines 1, 2 and 3. Line 1 was a circular route running around the northern suburbs, with the other two forming radial lines running out to Newbridge in the west and to Newcraighall in the south respectively. All lines would run through the city centre.

Line 3 was later shelved due to lack of Scottish Parliament approval. Lines 1 and 2 were combined and split into three phases, with Phase 1 being further divided into Phase 1a and 1b. Phases 1b, 2 and 3 were not funded.

When the tramway opened to passengers in 2014, only a truncated section of the planned Phase 1a line (running from the airport to the city centre) had been constructed. Construction of the remainder of the Phase 1a line began in 2019, and it opened to passengers in 2023.

In August 2025, a public consultation was launched for an additional extension serving the north–south axis of the city. This could link Granton in the north via either the Roseburn Path to Murrayfield or via Orchard Brae and Dean Bridge to the west end of Princes Street. There are also proposals to run trams over North Bridge and South Bridge to Cameron Toll then along Old Dalkeith Road to the Royal Infirmary and BioQuarter. The cost is estimated at between £2bn and £2.9bn. This comprises sections of the original Lines 1 and 3.

== Line 1 (North Edinburgh) ==
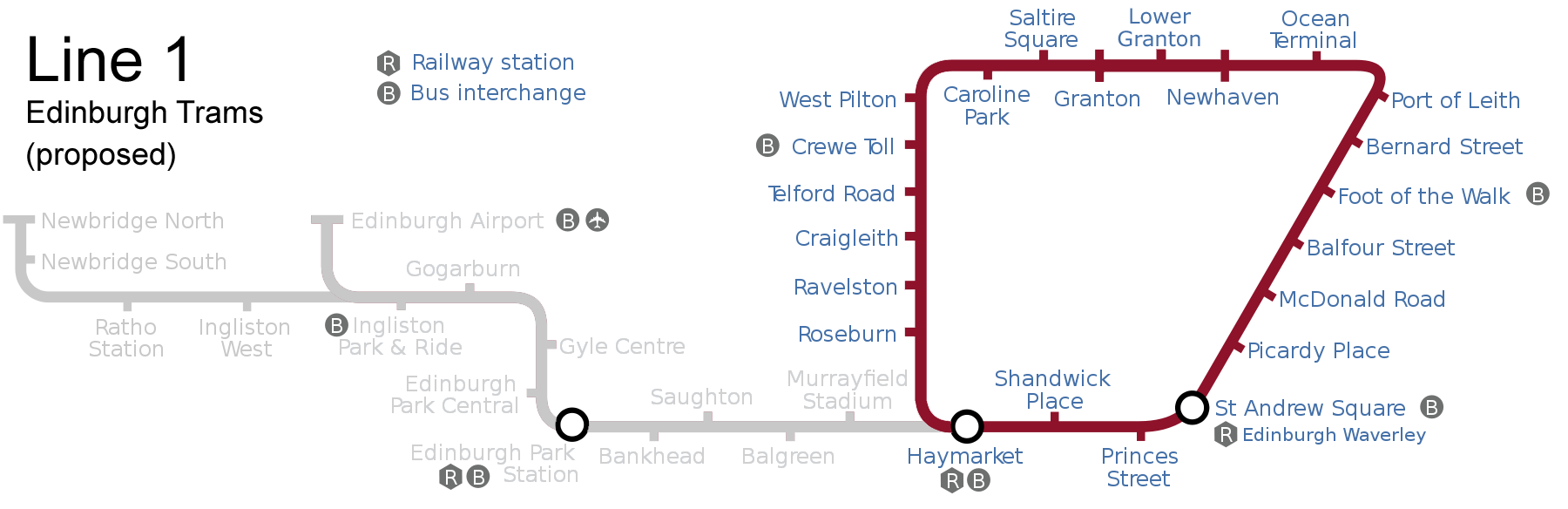
Diagram of Line 1 proposed in 2001

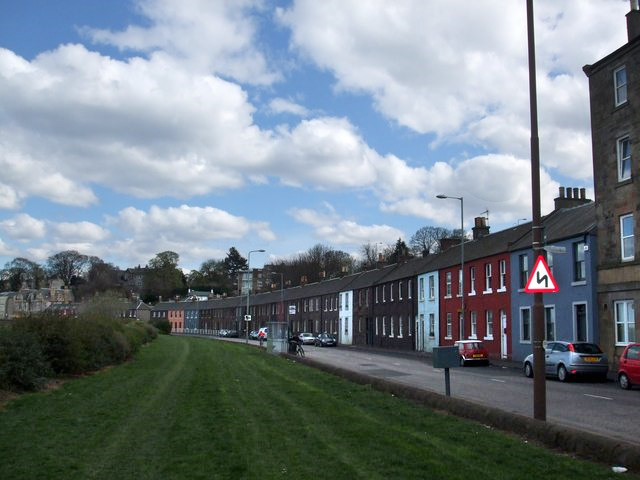
The planned route of the tram line along the waterfront at Granton

Line 1 was planned to be a 15.25-kilometre (9.48 mi) circular route with 22 stops running around the northern suburbs, following a route from the City Centre, St Andrew Square, York Place, Picardy Place, down Leith Walk to Leith and Newhaven. The line would then run along the waterfront to Granton, where it would then loop back, taking over the disused Caledonian Railway route between via Crewe Toll to Wester Coates and Haymarket. Upon reaching Haymarket, trams will return to on-street running mode and head back along Princes Street.

Line 1 comprised 2.3 kilometres (1.4 mi) of on-street track integrated with other traffic, 2.7 kilometres (1.7 mi) of segregated track running along existing roads, and 10.5 kilometres (6.5 mi) separate tramway. The on-street sections of track would be in the centre of the road in some locations and at the kerbside in others. On the disused line to Granton, the tram line would be integrated with cycle and pedestrian pathways along the Roseburn wildlife corridor.

In the initial Phase 1a of the project, only the Newhaven-Leith Walk-Princes Street section of this route was included, with trams then continuing west to the airport (Line 2 route). Further construction of the Line 1 loop (Phase 1b of the project) was cancelled in 2009 due to financial constraints, postponing construction of the Haymarket-Granton section of this line indefinitely. Phase 2, which would complete the loop with a line from Granton Square to Newhaven, also remains unfunded.

Name	Phase	Transport Interchange	Serves
Haymarket	Phase 1a	Haymarket railway station Lothian Buses; Line 2 (West Edinburgh)	Edinburgh International Conference Centre; St Mary's Music School
Shandwick Place	Phase 1a		
Princes Street	Phase 1a		Princes Street; National Gallery of Scotland
St Andrew Square	Phase 1a	Lothian Buses; Edinburgh Bus Station; Waverley Station	St Andrew Square; St. James Centre
Picardy Place	Phase 1a		Omni Centre; Edinburgh Playhouse
McDonald Road	Phase 1a		Easter Road Stadium
Balfour Street	Phase 1a		Pilrig Park
Foot of the Walk	Phase 1a	Lothian Buses	
Bernard Street	Phase 1a		
Port of Leith (formerly Ocean Drive)	Phase 1a		Scottish Government building
Ocean Terminal	Phase 1a		Ocean Terminal; Royal Yacht Britannia
Newhaven	Phase 1a		Newhaven
Lower Granton	Phase 2		
Granton (formerly Granton Square)	Phase 1b		
Saltire Square (formerly Granton Waterfront)	Phase 1b		
Caroline Park	Phase 1b		Edinburgh College (Granton Campus)
West Pilton (formerly West Granton)	Phase 1b		
Crewe Toll	Phase 1b	Lothian Buses	Fettes College; Leonardo S.p.A. (Edinburgh Site)
Telford road	Phase 1b		Western General Hospital
Craigleith	Phase 1b		Craigleith Retail Park
Ravelston Dykes	Phase 1b		Scottish National Gallery of Modern Art; Stewart's Melville College; The Mary Erskine School; St. George's School
Roseburn	Phase 1b		
The line continues to Haymarket to complete the loop

== Line 2 (West Edinburgh) ==
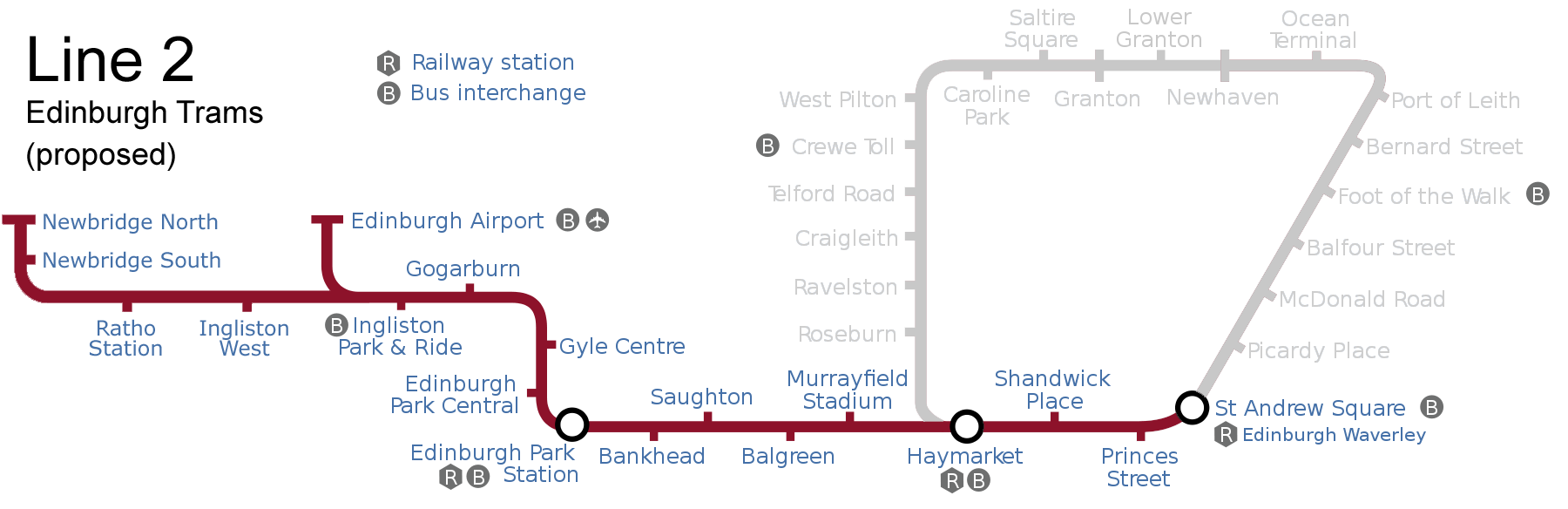
Diagram of Line 2 proposed in 2001

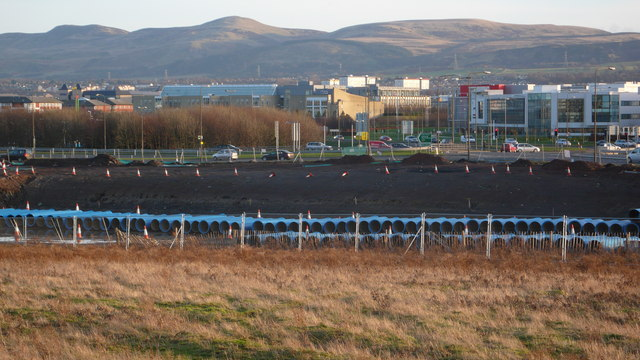
Construction of the new tram depot at Gogar

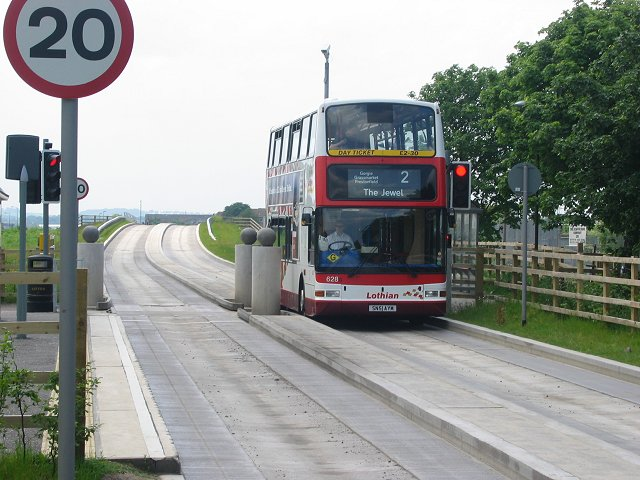
The temporary Fastlink guided bus

Line 2 would have been an 18-kilometre (11 mi) route from the City Centre out to Edinburgh Airport via Edinburgh Park, with a branch line to Newbridge and a total of 19 stops. The airport route was subsequently incorporated into Phase 1a of the project. The branch to Newbridge is dependent on funding becoming available for Phase 3 of the construction project.

In Phase 1a, from St Andrew Square to Haymarket, a 1.4-mile (2.3 km) line of on-street track integrates with other traffic along Princes Street and Shandwick Place. At Haymarket station, the tram line diverges from the road and runs down a segregated tramway via Haymarket Yards. The Line 1 branch north towards Granton (Phase 1b) would be located at the bridge over Russell Road. The Phase 1a line continues west, past the Haymarket rail depot and Murrayfield Stadium. Trams then move onto a dedicated track running parallel to the Edinburgh-Glasgow railway line, briefly crossing south of the railway to serve Sighthill and Edinburgh Park, before heading north, parallel to the City Bypass to the Gyle. The tramway then passes under the A8 road just the east of the Gogar Roundabout, turns west over green belt land, and then north behind the Hilton Hotel and alongside the Gogar Burn to a terminus within the existing airport bus station.

The planned branch to Newbridge would begin at the Ingliston stop, continuing west past the Royal Highland Showground, before crossing onto the central reservation of the A8. It would then turn south via Ratho Station to rejoin the Glasgow main line. At Harvest Road trams would switch to street-running mode again, sharing the road with traffic to the Newbridge industrial estate before crossing the A89 road and terminating at the Newbridge roundabout.

A preliminary guided bus service along part of the future route of Line 2, Fastlink, opened in December 2004. This concrete track, which ran parallel to the Edinburgh-Glasgow railway line from Saughton to Edinburgh Park, was converted to a tram track, replacing the guided bus service with the tram line.

On 27 September 2007, the Scottish Government announced the cancellation of the Edinburgh Airport Rail Link, a separate project to link mainline rail services to Edinburgh Airport. As an alternative, the government plans that an additional stop is built adjacent to a proposed Gogar railway station be constructed. This newly built rail station and tram stop would provide an interchange on the Fife Circle Line with airport tram services. Costs for this have not been stated and would be in addition to the currently budgeted-for amount.

The station in the Gogar area, just prior to the Gogarburn tram depot when going westbound, was opened on 11 December 2016, linking the Fife Circle Line to the Edinburgh tram network. It is called Edinburgh Gateway station.

Name	Phase	Transport Interchange	Serves
Between the city centre and Haymarket, trams run along Line 1.
Haymarket	Phase 1a	Haymarket; Lothian Buses; Line 1 (North Edinburgh)	Edinburgh International Conference Centre
Murrayfield Stadium	Phase 1a		Murrayfield Stadium
Balgreen	Phase 1a		Edinburgh Zoo
Saughton	Phase 1a		
Bankhead	Phase 1a		Stevenson College
Edinburgh Park	Phase 1a	Edinburgh Park	Hermiston Gait retail park
Edinburgh Park Central	Phase 1a		Edinburgh Park
Gyle Centre	Phase 1a		Gyle Shopping Centre
Gogarburn	Phase 1a	Gogar	Royal Bank of Scotland headquarters
Ingliston Park & Ride	Phase 1a	Lothian Buses	
Line splits – Edinburgh Airport branch
Edinburgh Airport	Phase 1a		Edinburgh Airport
Newbridge branch
Ingliston West	Phase 3		Royal Highland Showground
Ratho Station	Phase 3		
Newbridge South	Phase 3		
Newbridge North	Phase 3		

== Line 3 (South East Edinburgh) ==
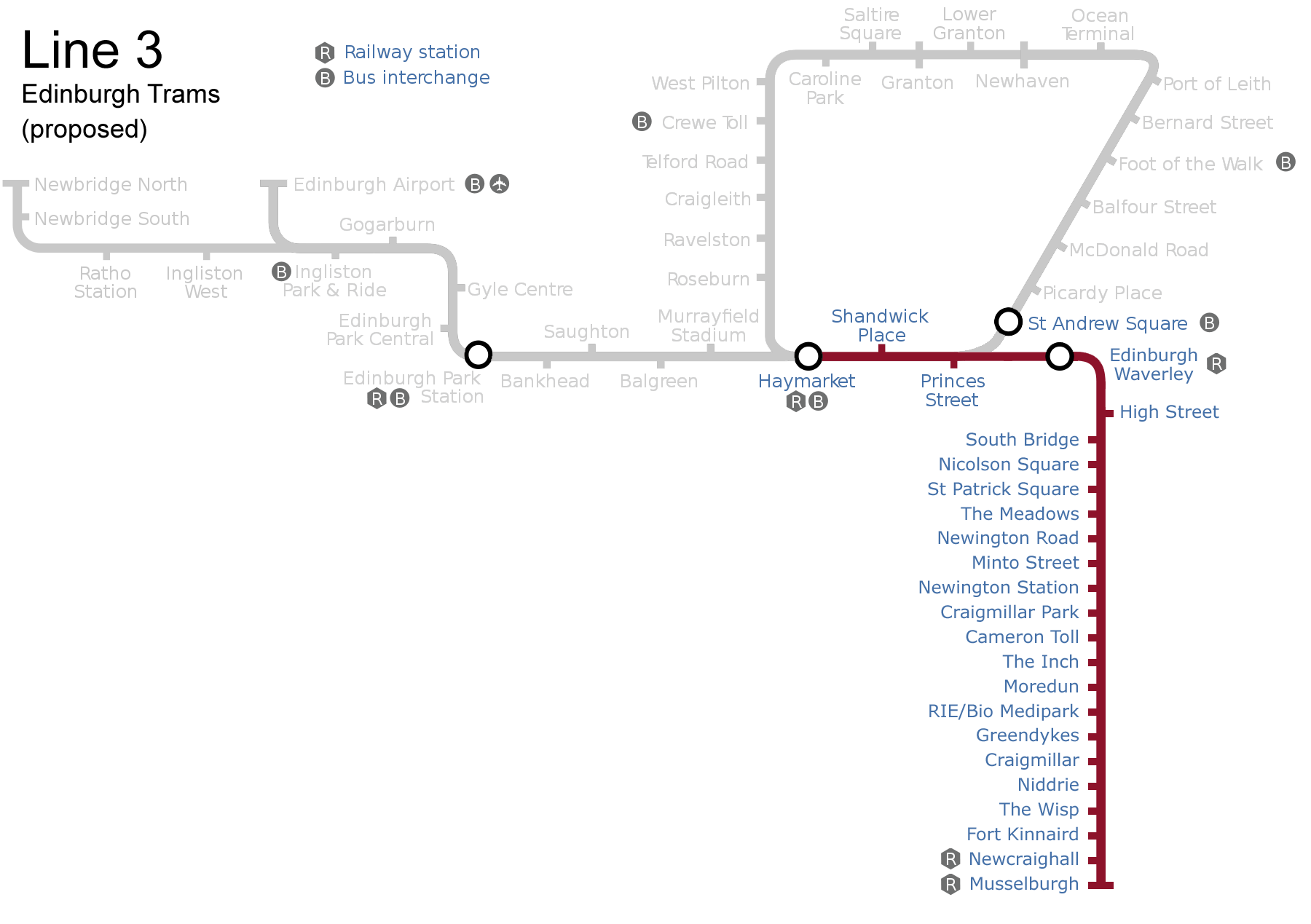
Diagram of Line 3 proposed in 2001

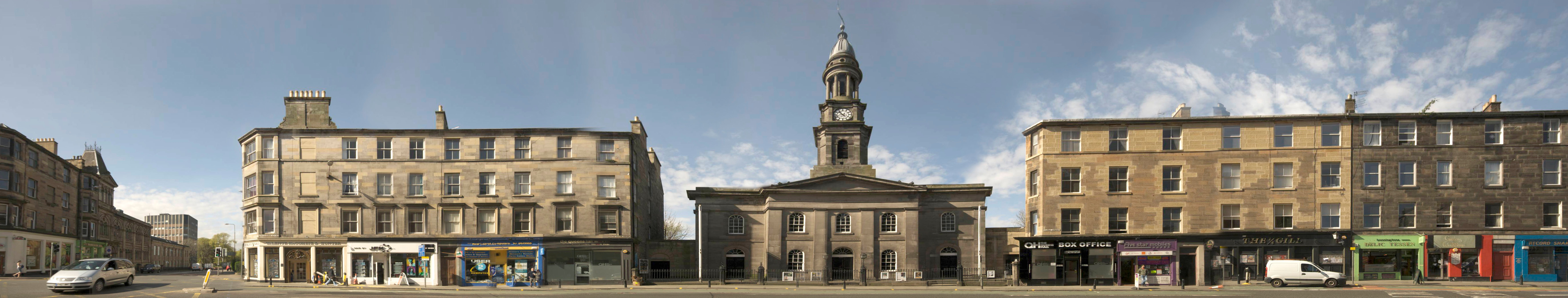
Clerk Street, on the route of Line 3

The proposals also featured a third tram line, which would run from the City Centre to the southern suburbs. The route was not finalised, but proposals indicated a preferred route would cross North Bridge and the Royal Mile, heading south past the University of Edinburgh, along Nicolson Street. An alternative route suggested trams could bypass the congested Nicolson Street and Clerk Street section by turning right into Nicolson Square and heading south along Potterrow. Southbound trams would return to Newington Road via West Preston Street, and a northbound track would run along Causewayside. A segregated track was proposed to cross Cameron Toll, and after crossing the Inch Park, trams would then run down the Old Dalkeith Road towards the Royal Infirmary of Edinburgh, and finally terminating at Newcraighall railway station park and ride. An extension to Musselburgh was also considered. City councillors also suggested that a route via London Road might be considered as an alternative extension to the network.

Line 3 was not approved by the Scottish Parliament and was not funded. Funding for the line depended on Edinburgh voters agreeing to a congestion charge, which was rejected in the Edinburgh road tolls referendum in 2005. Following the referendum defeat, Edinburgh City Council applied to the Scottish Government for £198 million funding for the line, but this request was turned down. As such, the proposal was put on hold indefinitely and does not form part of the approved phases, but the land needed for the line was protected until at least 2015.

Name	Phase	Transport Interchange	Serves
Waverley station	N/A	Waverley Station; Lothian Buses; Line 1 (North Edinburgh)	
High Street	N/A		Royal Mile
South Bridge	N/A		
Nicolson Square	N/A		University of Edinburgh George Square campus
St Patrick Square	N/A		
The Meadows	N/A		The Meadows
Newington Road	N/A		Newington
Minto Street	N/A		
Newington Station	N/A		Interchange with South Suburban Railway at Newington Station
Craigmillar Park	N/A		University of Edinburgh King's Buildings campus (at some distance)
Cameron Toll	N/A		Cameron Toll Shopping Centre
The Inch	N/A		
Moredun	N/A		Moredun
RIE/Bio Medipark	N/A		Royal Infirmary of Edinburgh
Greendykes	N/A		Greendykes
Craigmillar	N/A		Craigmillar
Niddrie	N/A		Niddrie
The Wisp	N/A		
Fort Kinnaird	N/A		Fort Kinnaird retail park
Newcraighall	N/A	Newcraighall	

== Revised north–south proposal (Granton to BioQuarter) ==
During the early 2020s, plans were developed for a revised north–south tram line which would connect Granton in the north of the city with the Bioquarter in the south east, and possibly further onto either Dalkeith or Queen Margaret University or Shawfair. At a meeting on 1 February 2024, City of Edinburgh Council voted to put the proposed north–south extension to public consultation; by this point, it had an estimated construction cost of £2bn.

In August 2025, a 12-week public consultation was launched for this extension serving the north–south axis of the city. This could link Granton in the north to Crewe Toll, then either via the Roseburn Path to Murrayfield or via Orchard Brae and Dean Bridge to the west end of Princes Street. To the south, the proposals would see trams run over North Bridge and South Bridge, through Newington to Cameron Toll along Lady Road, then along Old Dalkeith Road to the Royal Infirmary and BioQuarter at Little France. A lift connecting the North Bridge tram stop to Waverley railway station below is also proposed.

The cost is estimated at between £2bn and £2.9bn depending on the option considered. The consultation will help inform a Strategic Business Case which will be presented to the council's Transport and Environment Committee in 2026. In December 2025, Scottish Government Transport Secretary Fiona Hyslop noted that while they are looking to develop a mass transit system known as "Sestrans" covering south east Scotland, "The Scottish Government has no plans to fund a standalone extension of Edinburgh’s tram network", which is being promoted by Edinburgh Council.

Future extensions beyond into the city region could link to Queen Margaret University and East Lothian or to Shawfair and Midlothian. It is not proposed to connect Granton and Newhaven, which would complete the original Line 1 loop, although this may be reconsidered in future.

=== Proposed routes and stops ===
The route via Orchard Brae connects to the existing line at the west end of Princes Street. Given the layout of this junction it would not be possible to run trams directly from Granton to the airport in future, instead passengers would have to change at the Princes Street stop.

To minimise land take and impact on ecology along the Roseburn Path, it is proposed the section between Roseburn and Craigleith would be single track. The previously considered stop at Ravelston Dykes is also excluded for space reasons.

Proposed route from Granton to city centre via Orchard Brae
Name	Transport Interchange	Serves
Granton Square		
Saltire Square		
Caroline Park		Edinburgh College (Granton Campus)
West Pilton		
Crewe Toll	Lothian Buses	Fettes College; Leonardo S.p.A. (Edinburgh Site)
Western General Hospital		Western General Hospital
Comely Bank		
Queensferry Road		Scottish National Gallery of Modern Art; Stewart's Melville College; The Mary Erskine School; St. George's School
Queensferry Street		
Connects to existing line at the west end of Princes Street

Proposed route from Granton to city centre via Roseburn Path
Name	Transport Interchange	Serves
Granton Square		
Saltire Square		
Caroline Park		Edinburgh College (Granton Campus)
West Pilton		
Crewe Toll	Lothian Buses	Fettes College; Leonardo S.p.A. (Edinburgh Site)
Telford Drive (for WGH)		Western General Hospital
Craigleith		Craigleith Retail Park
Single track section
Roseburn		
Connects to existing line at Russel Road via delta junction

Proposed route from city centre to BioQuarter
Name	Transport Interchange	Serves
Connects to existing line at the east end of Princes Street/South St Andrew Street via delta junction
North Bridge	Edinburgh Waverley railway station (via new lift)	Royal Mile
Nicolson Street		University of Edinburgh (central campus)
Newington		
Mayfield Gardens		
Cameron Toll		Cameron Toll Shopping Centre
The Inch		
Royal Infirmary		Royal Infirmary of Edinburgh
BioQuarter		Edinburgh BioQuarter

== Other proposals: Edinburgh South Suburban Railway ==
The Edinburgh South Suburban Railway (including hypothetically reopened stations) with tram interchanges shown

In addition to the three routes selected by transport planners, other proposals were put forward for inclusion in the tram network. Local campaigning groups have suggested that it would be possible to re-open the Edinburgh South Suburban Railway, or "South Sub", as an extension to Edinburgh trams. This proposal was rejected by the Scottish Parliament in 2009, on grounds of cost and the line will not be re-opened for the foreseeable future.

In 2025, plans to use tram-trains on the South Sub were developed by a group of six MEng students for their final-year Civil Engineering project at Heriot-Watt University. They noted that previous proposals to re-open the route to passenger traffic had all considered traditional heavy rail, but they proposed using tram-trains as used in Sheffield and Rotherham in England, and extensively in Europe. By connecting to the existing tram line, it would also avoid capacity issues at the Waverley and Haymarket railway stations, which had been a concern in previous proposals. The students note that, since the tracks and parts of the old stations are still in place, it would be easier to reopen the route with less disruption than occurred building the current line. This proposal gained support from several MSPs, plus over 2,500 petition signatures.

In January 2026, a Suburban Circle route was included in a map of a possible future network, proposed by Edinburgh City Council, described as "conceptual representation" of a future multi-modal network. The council's priority is still the north–south extension, but this could be an additional element of a future network. If opened, it would require "more robust tram-trains", as used in Sheffield on the South Yorkshire Supertram.

The map shows a junction to the exiting tram between Haymarket and Murrayfield, and another on Leith Walk between McDonald Road and Picardy Place. Around Meadowbank, the tram would leave the railway line and run on-street. Twelve stops are shown on the map as follows (anti-clockwise):

- Gorgie East (for Tynecastle)
- Craiglockhart (for Napier Uni.)
- Morningside Road
- Blackford Hill (for King's Buildings)
- Newington
- Cameron Toll
- Duddingston & Craigmillar
- Fort Kinnaird
- Brunstane
- Portobello
- Abbeyhill (for Easter Road)
- Hillside

Also shown on the map are future connections east and south, as extensions to the north–south line, and the Almond Chord rail link towards Winchburgh.

In August 2026, Transport Scotland and Network Rail jointly announced a "high-level" feasibility study into the proposals. The study would be funded by the Scottish government.
