= Crummy =

Crummy may refer to:

- A railroaders' slang term for a caboose
- A loggers' term for the vehicle transporting loggers to the work site

== People with the surname ==
- Andrew Crummy (born 1959), Scottish artist
- Helen Crummy, founder of The Craigmillar Festival Society
