= Great Tapestry of Scotland =

Series of embroidered cloths depicting aspects of the history of Scotland

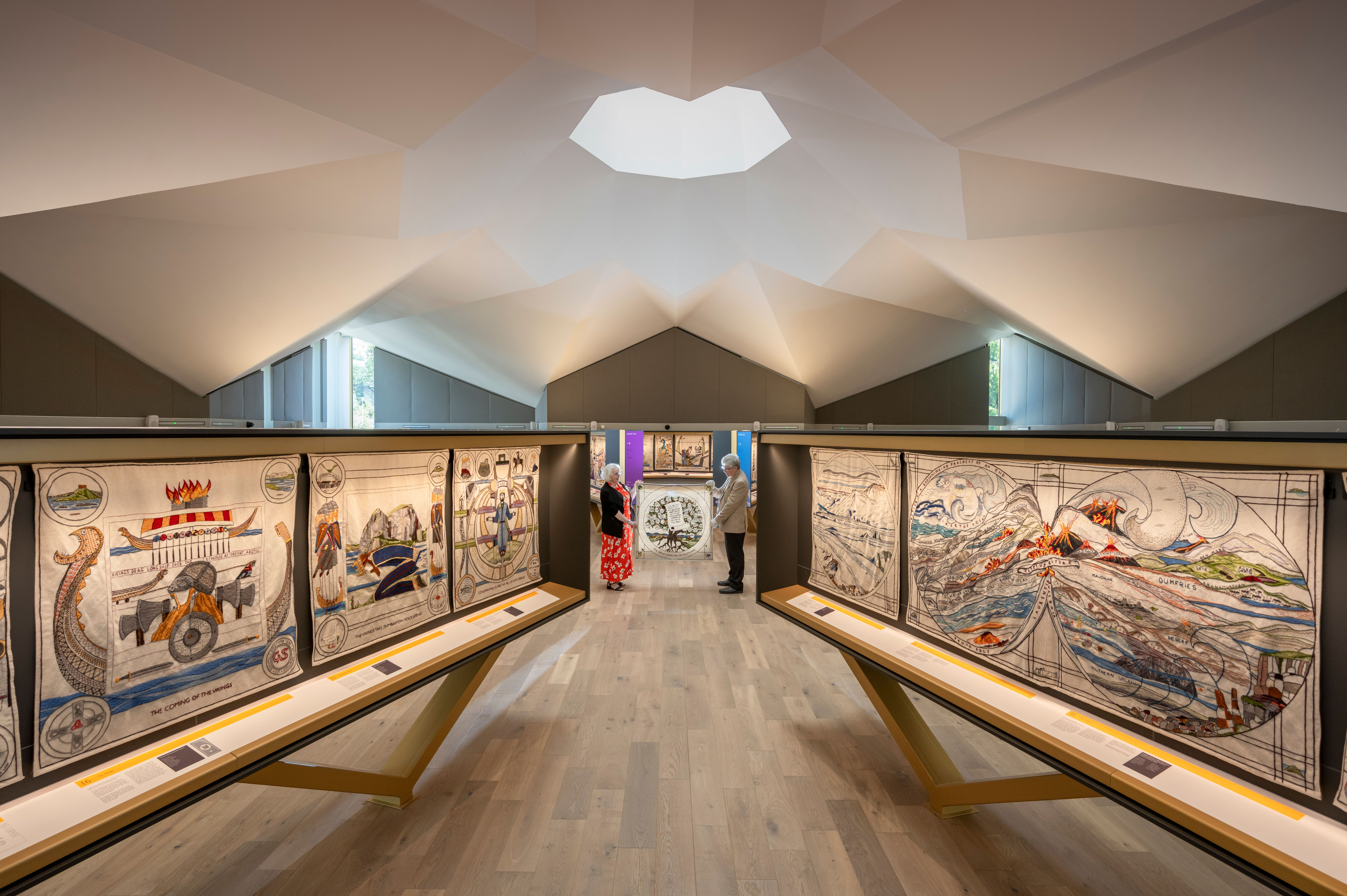

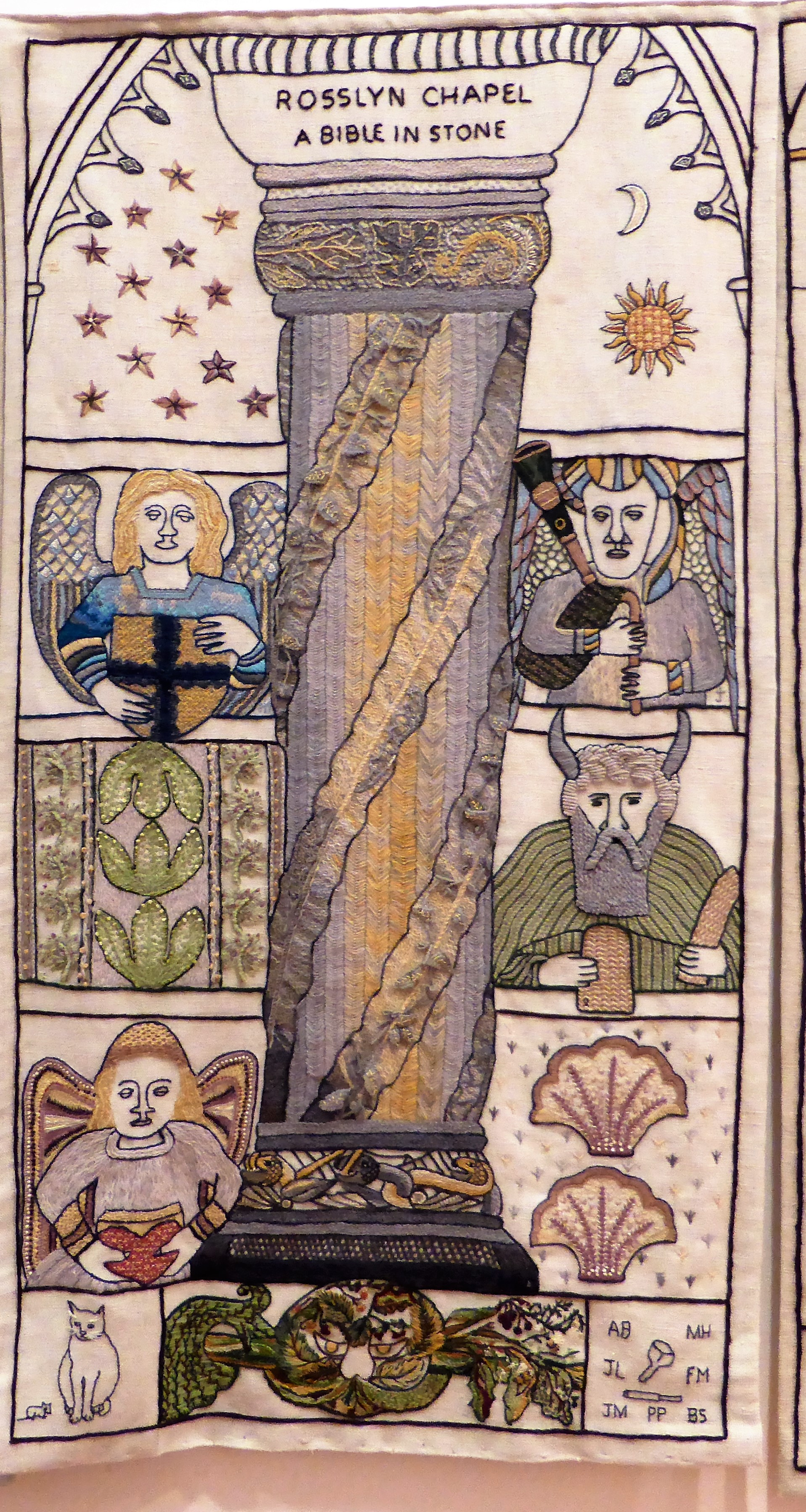
Rosslyn Chapel embroidered panel from the Great Tapestry of Scotland

The Great Tapestry of Scotland is one of the world's largest community arts projects, hand stitched by 1,000 people from across Scotland. It is made up of 160 linen panels and 300 miles of wool – enough to stretch the entire length of Scotland. It is now on permanent display in its own purpose-built gallery and visitor centre in the town of Galashiels in the heartland of the Scottish Borders.

The tapestry itself tells the story of Scotland's history, heritage and culture – from the country's land formation millions of years BC right to 2013 when the last panel was completed. In addition to housing the tapestry itself, the new visitor centre is home to a café, shop, a workshop space and a gallery for additional visiting exhibits.

== Background ==
The tapestry was designed by Andrew Crummy, son of Helen Crummy, who had previously designed the Battle of Prestonpans Tapestry and later the Scottish Diaspora Tapestry. It implements an idea of Scottish author Alexander McCall Smith for a grand tapestry to depict episodes from 12,000 years of the history of Scotland, after he had seen the Prestonpans Tapestry. Historical writer Alistair Moffat was involved in the selection of which people to depict. Presiding Officer of the Scottish Parliament Tricia Marwick was invited to sew the first stitch and did so with McCall Smith in March 2012.

Each of the panels took around 500 hours to sew, involving over a thousand volunteers from existing or newly formed sewing groups across Scotland working between Spring 2012 and September 2013. Members of a studio group based at Eskbank, Dalkeith prepared the panels for display by stretching and backing them, and the completed tapestry was unveiled on 3 September 2013 in the Main Hall of the Scottish Parliament building.

Referred to as the 'People's Story of Scotland', the Tapestry is believed to be one of Scotland's most significant examples of documentary heritage, charting the collective memories of a nation. The stitchers involved in each panel researched each story and added details which convey sometimes first hand accounts, as well as hidden details which tell the stitchers own stories. For example, in telling the story of the D-day piper Bill Millin, stitchers met with and befriended his son, John Millin. . Another stitcher added a hidden embroidered helicopter floating in the sea to the panel telling the history of Fair Isle knitting. It marks the spot where her husband, a subsea engineer, survived a Super Puma crash in October 2012.

== Dimensions ==
The tapestry measures 143 metres (469 ft) long, each panel being displayed individually in approximately chronological order. In comparison, the Keiskamma tapestry in South Africa is 120 metres (390 ft) long, and the Bayeux Tapestry is nearly 70 metres (230 ft) long. Most of the panels are approximately 1 metre (3 ft 3 in) square, with only a few measuring 1/2 metre wide.

== Materials ==
The linen–cotton union fabric used is made by Peter Greig and Company (based at Victoria Linen Works, Kirkcaldy, Scotland), and the 2-ply crewel wool is dyed and spun by Appletons, of Buckinghamshire, England.

== Content ==
The panels include illustrations of the end of the most recent ice age in 8,500 BC, the circumnavigation by Pytheas in c. 320 BC, Viking invasions in the 9th century, Duns Scotus in c. 1300, the Battle of Bannockburn in 1314, the Black Death in the 1350s, the foundation of the University of St Andrews in 1413, the Battle of Flodden in 1513, Mary, Queen of Scots in the 16th century, the publication of the King James Bible in 1611, the Act of Union 1707, the Jacobite rising of 1715 and of 1745, James Watt, Adam Smith, David Hume, James Boswell, Walter Scott, James Clerk Maxwell, Highland Games, the First and Second World Wars, the first-ever international rugby match (between Scotland and England in 1871), North Sea oil from the 1990s, Dolly the Sheep born 1996, and the re-creation of the Scottish Parliament in 1999. A late detail was added to commemorate Andy Murray's victory at Wimbledon in 2013.

== People's Panel ==
For its second visit to the Scottish Parliament from 1 July – 13 September 2014 a new panel was created: the People's Panel. Visitors to the exhibition were encouraged to add stitches to it. It travelled with the tapestry until completed and was then presented to the Scottish Parliament where it now hangs.

== Exhibitions ==
The tapestry has been exhibited, in part or whole, throughout Scotland, visiting New Lanark, Ayr Town Hall, Cockenzie House East Lothian, Stirling Castle, Aberdeen Art Gallery, Kirkcaldy Art Gallery, Anchor Mill Paisley, Sgoil Lionacleit on Benbecula, Inverness Museum and Art Gallery, and Verdant Works Dundee, amongst others. A selection of panels was also exhibited at the Cheltenham Literature Festival in 2013.

Since August 2021, the Tapestry is now on permanent display in a new gallery and visitor centre in Galashiels in the Scottish Borders, designed by Glasgow-based architects Page/Park.

== Theft of Rosslyn Chapel Panel ==
During the exhibition at Kirkcaldy Galleries in the summer of 2015, the Rosslyn Chapel panel was stolen. It is one of the half-width panels. It has not yet been recovered.

In 2016, the original stitchers began making a replacement, which was finished in 2017 and has joined the rest of the tapestry at the permanent exhibition in Galashiels. The recreated panel closely resembles the stolen panel but several differences were added to differentiate it from the original.

== Bayeux Tapestry connection ==
The Bayeux Tapestry was the inspiration behind artist Andrew Crummy’s vision for The Great Tapestry of Scotland. The Great Tapestry of Scotland also includes a panel dedicated to the story of St Margaret of Scotland - the English princess who sought refuge in Scotland following the Norman Conquest of 1066, providing a direct connection to the period depicted in Bayeux.

In 2026, The Great Tapestry of Scotland visitor centre was revealed as one of only three Scottish cultural venues to feature in The British Museum's Bayeux Around Britain Programme. The centre will host a range of events and exhibitions, while the Bayeux Tapestry is on display at The British Museum in London during 2026/27.

== Outlander connection ==
The Outlander star Sam Heughan supported the opening Iconic Scotland exhibit for The Great Tapestry of Scotland by contributing his reflections, photo, a signed copy of his Clanlands book and a bottle of his own Sassenach whisky. Speaking of his involvement Sam tweeted: "Please check out the wonderful Great Tapestry Of Scotland – honoured to feature alongside so many great Scottish personalities that have influenced Scotland...It’s a country and culture I’m proud of and continue to promote in everything I do."

The visitor centre marked the final season of Outlander in 2026, with an Ode to the Jacobites exhibit.

== Sources ==
- Moffat, Alistair (2013). The Great Tapestry of Scotland: The Making of a Masterpiece. Edinburgh: Birlinn. ISBN 978-1-78027-160-6.
