= The White House, Edinburgh =

Cafe and community hub in Scotland

The White House
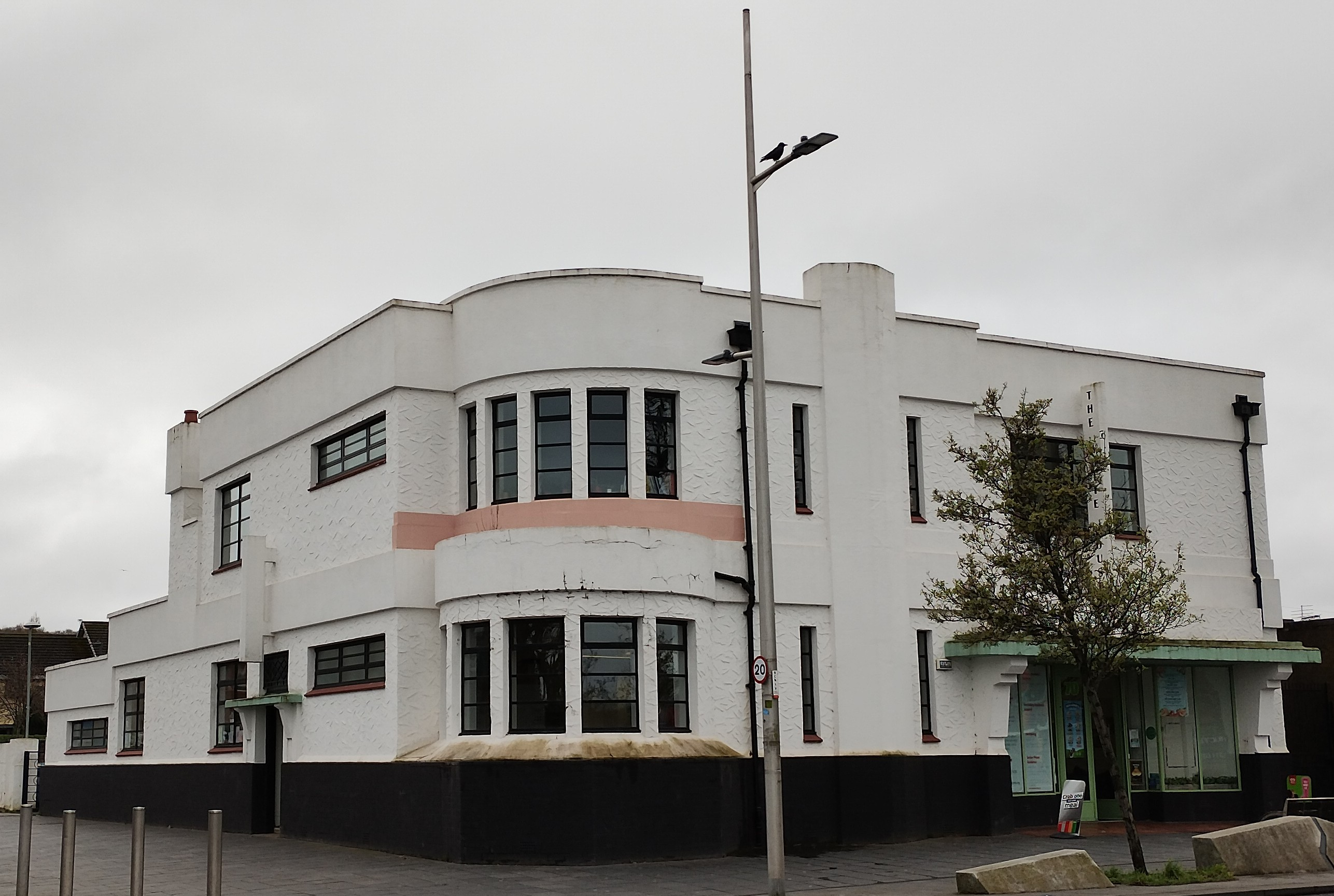
- The White House in 2024
- Interactive map of the The White House area
- Alternative names: The Whitehouse

General information
- Type: Roadhouse
- Architectural style: International Style, Modern, Moderne, Art Deco
- Location: 70 Niddrie Mains Road, Edinburgh, Scotland
- Coordinates: 55.932554°N 3.138479°W
- Grid reference: NT 28984 71640
- Current tenants: Community Alliance Trust
- Opened: 1936
- Renovated: 2010
- Renovation cost: c.£1.85 million (equivalent to £3.38 million in 2025)
- Client: Jemima Hood Gair
- Owner: PARC Craigmillar

Technical details
- Material: Brick
- Floor count: 2

Design and construction
- Architect: William Innes Thomson
- Architecture firm: W N Thomson and Co

Renovating team
- Architect: Smith Scott Mullan
- Structural engineer: Curtins Consulting Engineers
- Services engineer: TPS
- Quantity surveyor: Gleeds Cost Management
- Main contractor: Thomas Johnstone

Listed Building – Category B
- Official name: Niddrie Mains Road and Craigmillar Castle Loan, The Whitehouse
- Designated: 7 December 1995
- Reference no.: LB30325

The White House (sometimes written The Whitehouse) is a former roadhouse on Niddrie Mains Road (at its junction with Craigmillar Castle Loan) in Edinburgh, Scotland, now used as a community café and volunteering centre.

== History ==
The White House was one of a number of roadhouses developed in Edinburgh in response to the growth of the motor car. It was designed by architect William Innes Thomson of the firm W N Thomson and Co for Jemima Hood Gair. Gair's fifteen year old daughter convinced her to request a Moderne design. The White House opened on 18 October 1936. It is a two-storey irregular-plan International Style and Modern building with Art Deco detailing; its lounge bar bay window has been compared to that of the card room of the RMS Queen Mary. The ground floor of the building featured a public bar, saloon bar, tea room, and skittle alley, while the first floor featured a billiard room and lounge bar.

The White House was popular due to the shortage of public houses in the Craigmillar and Niddrie neighbourhoods of Edinburgh. It later evolved from a roadhouse into a public house owned by Tennent Caledonian Breweries. By the 1970s, it was known for its "happy-go-lucky" clientele. In 1995, The White House was granted category 'B' listed status by Historic Scotland.

The White House fell into decline in the late 20th century, eventually closing in 2000. It was added to the Buildings at Risk Register for Scotland in 2004. In 2005, the building was the subject of a major fire which destroyed its skittle alley.

In 2007, The White House was acquired from receivers by PARC Craigmillar, an arm's length company of the City of Edinburgh Council. After grants were awarded from Historic Scotland and the Scottish Government's Town Centre Regeneration Fund, a c.£1.85 million (equivalent to £3.12 million in 2025) restoration of The White House began in April 2010 and completed in March 2011. The works saw the building envelope restored, improvements made to the roof and windows, and repairs to internal elements such as the cornices and staircase, while art deco elements of the interior were restored utilising the original linen blueprints. The architect for the renovation was Smith Scott Mullan and the principal contractor was Thomas Johnstone. On 18 September 2013, The White House was formally reopened as a community café, art space, and volunteering centre by Cabinet Secretary for Justice Kenny MacAskill MSP. It is operated by the Community Alliance Trust - a local charity - under a lease from PARC Craigmillar.

In December 2024, the National Transport Trust inaugurated a "Red Wheel" plaque on the building.
