= Andrew Crummy =

Scottish artist (born 1959)

Andrew Crummy MBE
- Born: 14 November 1959 (age 66); Craigmillar, Edinburgh, Scotland
- Education: Glasgow School of Art (MA Design), Duncan of Jordanstone College of Art and Design (BA Illustration and Printmaking)
- Known for: Tapestry, murals, illustration
- Notable work: Scottish Diaspora Tapestry (2012), Great Tapestry of Scotland (2013)
- Website: andrewcrummy.com

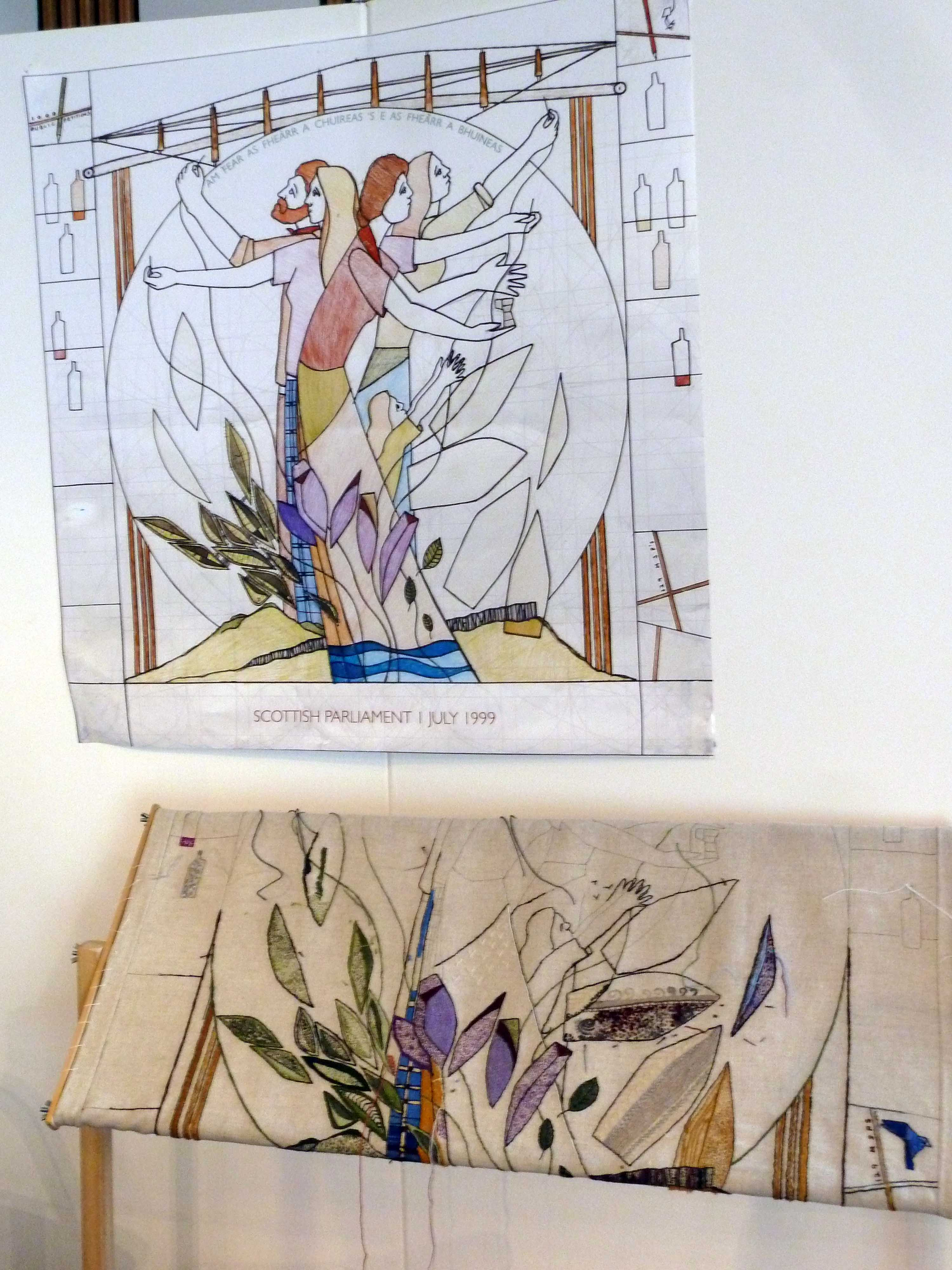
The "People's Panel" of the Great Tapestry of Scotland: design and work in progress

Andrew Thomas Crummy (born 14 November 1959) is a Scottish artist, who has designed several major works such as the Great Tapestry of Scotland (2013).

== Early life and education ==
Crummy was born in Craigmillar, Edinburgh, where his mother Helen Crummy was a community activist and founder of the Craigmillar Festival Society. He attended Portobello High School and then gained a B.A. (Hons) in Illustration and Printmaking, at Duncan of Jordanstone College of Art (1983) and an M.A. in design at Glasgow School of Art (1984). He attributes his artistic nature to his culturally rich childhood, and his immersion in the community arts scene and the Craigmillar Festival. His work includes tapestry, murals, illustration, sculpture and painting.

== Major works and art style ==
- Tapestry of Renfrewshire
- Prestonpans Tapestry (2010)
- Great Tapestry of Scotland (2013)
- Scottish Diaspora Tapestry (2014)
- Gordon Highlanders WW1 Tapestry (2015)
- Mount Felix Tapestry (2017)
- Declaration of Arbroath Tapestry (2020)
- Clackmannanshire Tapestry (2022)
- Dundee Tapestry (2024)

== Honours ==
Andrew Crummy was appointed as a Member of the Order of the British Empire (MBE) in the 2023 New Year Honours for services to art and to cultural heritage in Scotland.

Crummy was awarded an honorary degree by the University of Dundee on 22 June 2023, in recognition of "his outstanding work in illustrating Scotland’s history, culture and heritage through magnificent community art works such as the Great Tapestry of Scotland and the Scottish Diaspora Tapestry". In the same year, he was awarded the Saltire Society's Fletcher of Saltoun Award, given to "innovators and entrepreneurs who shape the cultural landscape of Scotland" in the field of "Public Life".
