= Greendykes =

Neighbourhood of Edinburgh, Scotland

Coordinates: 55°55′39″N 3°07′34″W

Greendykes: Scots: Greendykes
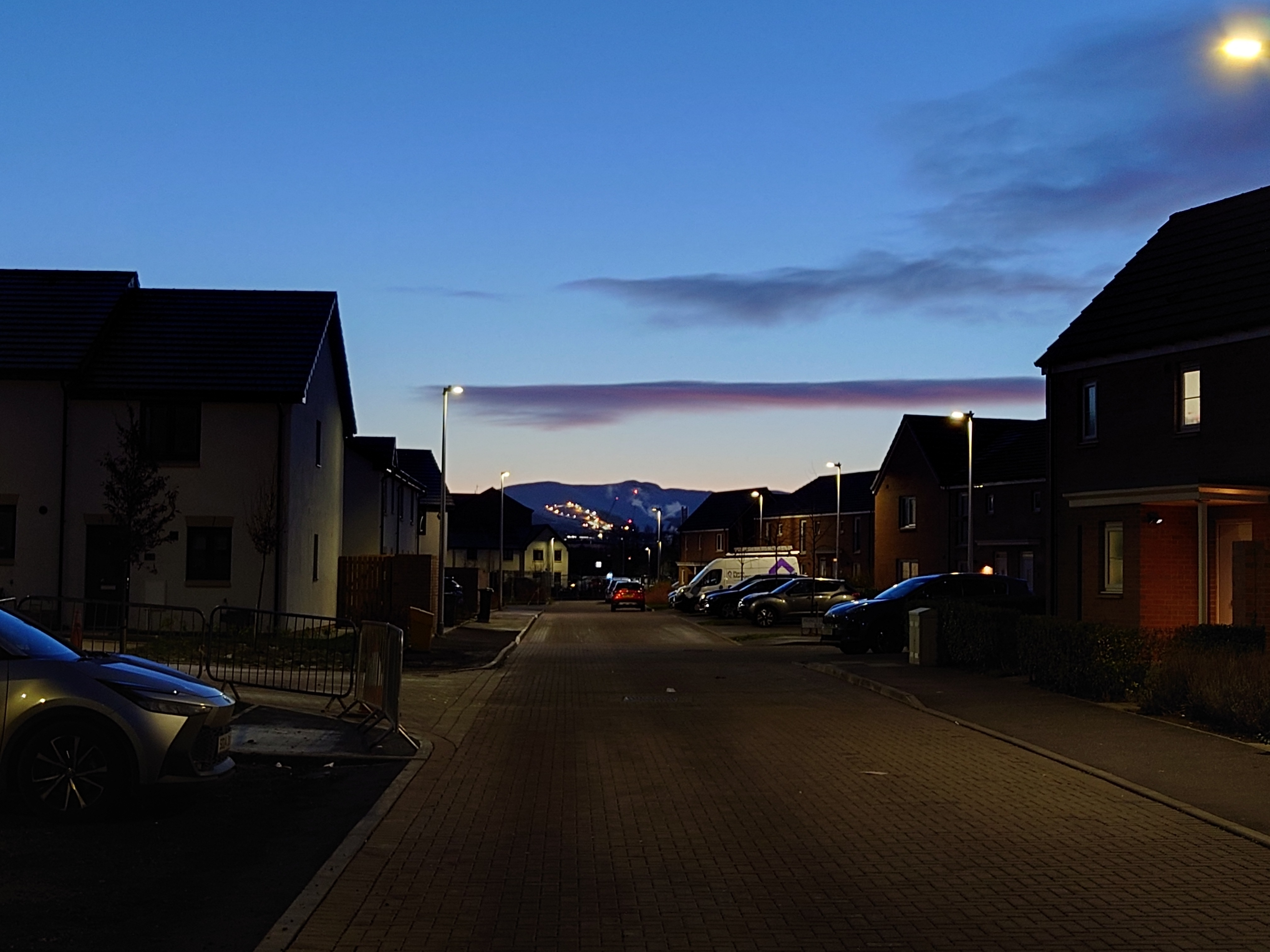
- Egan Terrace, Greendykes, at sunset

- Location within the City of Edinburgh council area Location within Scotland
- OS grid reference: NT297710
- Community council: Craigmillar
- Council area: City of Edinburgh
- Country: Scotland
- Sovereign state: United Kingdom
- Post town: EDINBURGH
- Postcode district: EH16
- Dialling code: 0131
- Police: Scotland
- Fire: Scottish
- Ambulance: Scottish
- UK Parliament: Edinburgh East and Musselburgh
- Scottish Parliament: Edinburgh Eastern

Greendykes is a neighbourhood of Edinburgh, the capital of Scotland. It was originally a council scheme, consisting mostly of low-rise flats but also two 15-storey tower blocks (Greendykes House and Wauchope House). It is sometimes considered to be part of Craigmillar; areas such as Niddrie, Niddrie Mains and Newcraighall are also situated nearby.

Greendykes was ranked as the 4th most deprived area in Scotland in the Scottish Index of Multiple Deprivation 2006, but it is now much less deprived. The low-rise flats were demolished between 2004 and 2010, and were replaced by new detached, semi-detached and terraced houses and small blocks of flats, partly social housing and partly private housing. Affordable housing is being provided through a joint venture known as PARClife between the city council and EDI, a private company 100% owned by the Council. Some of the new housing in the area is built to the south of the original Greendykes housing, on the opposite side of the Niddrie Burn (itself landscaped as a southern extension of Hunter's Hall Public Park).

Castlebrae Community High School was located at the western edge of the neighbourhood, adjacent to Castleview Primary School, but has now moved to a new site north of Niddrie Mains Road.

== Sources ==
(Google Maps)
