= The Great Tapestry of Scotland Visitor Centre =

Coordinates: 55.6174°N 2.8095°W

The Great Tapestry of Scotland, visitor centre
- Established: 2021
- Visitors: 20,962 (2025/26)
- Architect: Page\Park Architects
- Website: https://www.greattapestryofscotland.com

The Great Tapestry of Scotland Visitor Centre is a visitor centre in Galashiels operated by the charity Live Borders. Designed by Page\Park Architects and opened in 2021, it is the permanent home of the Great Tapestry of Scotland, displaying the 160 tapestry panels that tell the story of Scotland through embroidery. In addition to the tapestry gallery, the centre also hosts Gallery 1420, a shop, café and an education space.

== Development and construction ==
Originally the visitor centre was intended to be built in Tweedbank. Scottish Borders Council stated that the proposed site's proximity to the Borders Railway made it a desirable and accessible location for the centre, but a petition arguing against this decision was signed by thousands. Plans were subsequently moved to Galashiels.

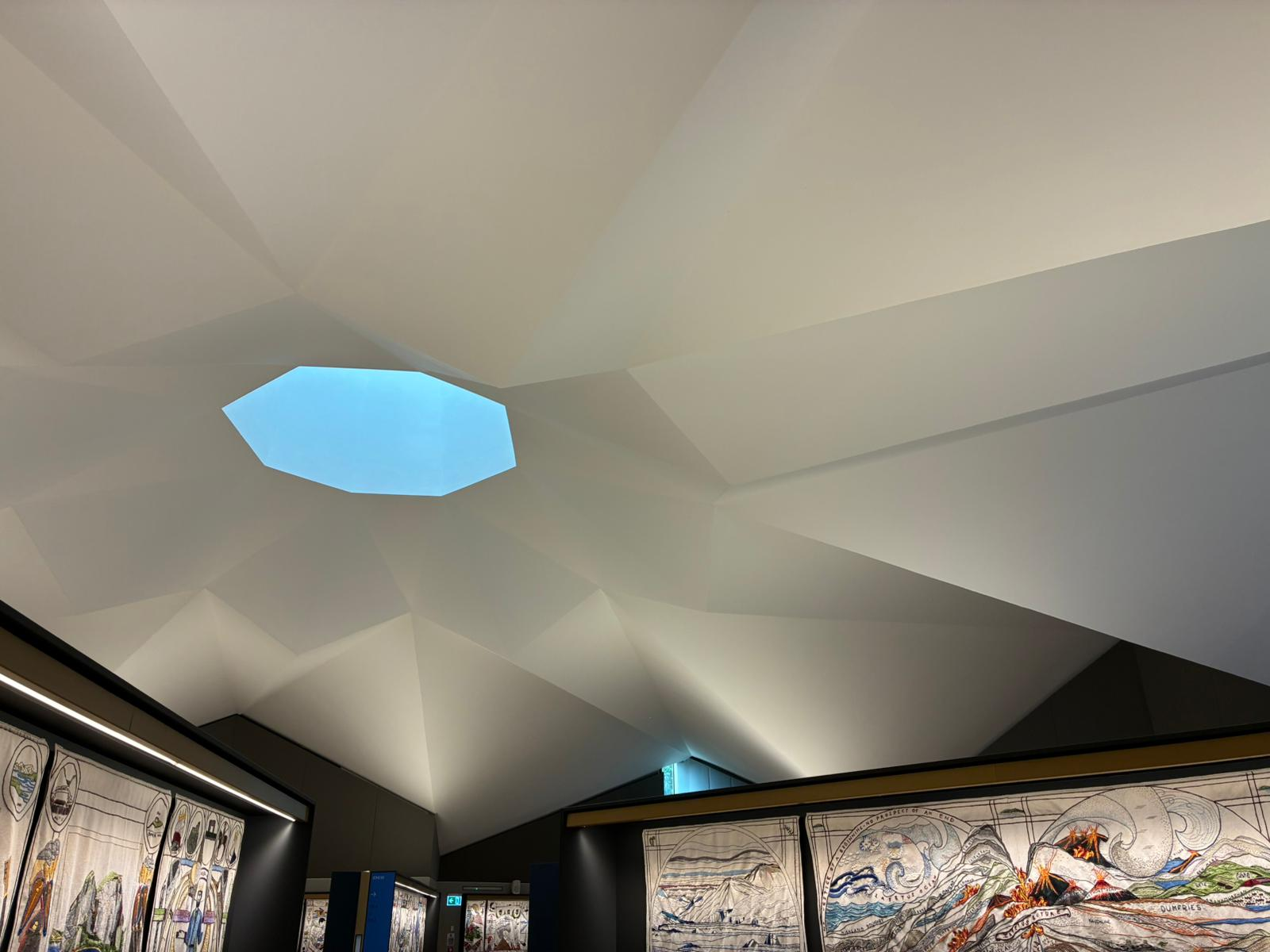
The ceiling of the gallery.

The building was designed by Page\Park Architects to reflect the architectural design seen in Galashiels, such as incorporating the pitched roofs of the nearby Victorian buildings through its geometric ceiling design. Inside, the gallery walls are mounted with fabric woven on the Isle of Bute, and the tapestry gallery uses specialist lighting and temperature controls. The development of the building reportedly cost £6.8 million, which was publicly funded, and a Poundstretcher shop was demolished to make way for the building. After delays related to the COVID-19 pandemic, the visitor centre opened in 2021. It was hoped that it would create 16 new jobs and contribute to the regeneration of Galashiels. Jura Consultants predicted that the centre would draw more than 50,000 visitors a year.

== Displays ==
In addition to the Great Tapestry of Scotland, the visitor centre also houses Gallery 1420. Its opening exhibit was named Iconic Scotland and featured items that celebrated Doddie Weir, Sam Heughan, Grant O'Rourke, Scott Hutchison, Sir Geoff Palmer, Joanna Lumley, Drew McIntyre and Sir Walter Scott. In 2022, it displayed textile designs made by students from Heriot-Watt University's School of Textiles and Design in an exhibit called A Yarn Worth Spinning. In the same year, it also displayed The Essex House Tapestries: Life of Julie Cope by Grayson Perry and items loaned from the Scottish Mask and Puppet Centre.

In 2026, the visitor centre unveiled a display named Ode to Jacobites, which included a signed copy of Sam Heughan's book Clanlands and a bottle of Sassenach Whisky.

In advance of the Bayeux Tapestry's transfer to the British Museum in London, it was announced in June 2026 that the Great Tapestry of Scotland visitor centre will be one of three Scottish venues to host Bayeux Around Britain, an interactive programme of events (including talks and workshops) that celebrate the Bayeux Tapestry. Sandy Maxwell-Forbes of Live Borders said, "As the home of one the world's longest tapestries, which was inspired by the Bayeux Tapestry, we were uniquely placed to help visitors explore the remarkable connections between these two extraordinary works." Furthermore, in September 2026, a year-long exhibition named Two Tapestries, Two Nations will be opened at the visitor centre.

== Reviews and attendance ==
Brian Ferguson for The Scotsman described the Great Tapestry of Scotland visitor centre "one of the best places to learn about Scottish history under the one roof." It has won Tripadvisor's Travellers' Choice Award three years in a row, and it received the South of Scotland Thistle Award for Inclusion. The CEO of Euan's Guide, Antonia Lee-Bapty, praised the centre for its accessibility.

In the first two years of its opening, the centre reported less than half of its predicted visitor numbers. It experiences its lowest visitor attendance in the 2025/26 period. Financial difficulties have also been reported. A Scottish Borders Council spokesperson stated that the operational deficit reported in the 2022/23 and 2023/2024 financial periods were related to COVID-19. In July 2024, it was reported that the centre had lost £500,000 since its opening.

Annual visitors to the Great Tapestry of Scotland visitor centre
Year	Annual visitors
2021/22	12,386(partial opening)
2022/23	22,303
2023/24	22,115
2024/25	22,413
2025/26	20,962
Figures sourced from BBC News
