= Great Tapestry of Scotland: People's Panel =

Public panel for Scotland's tapestry project.

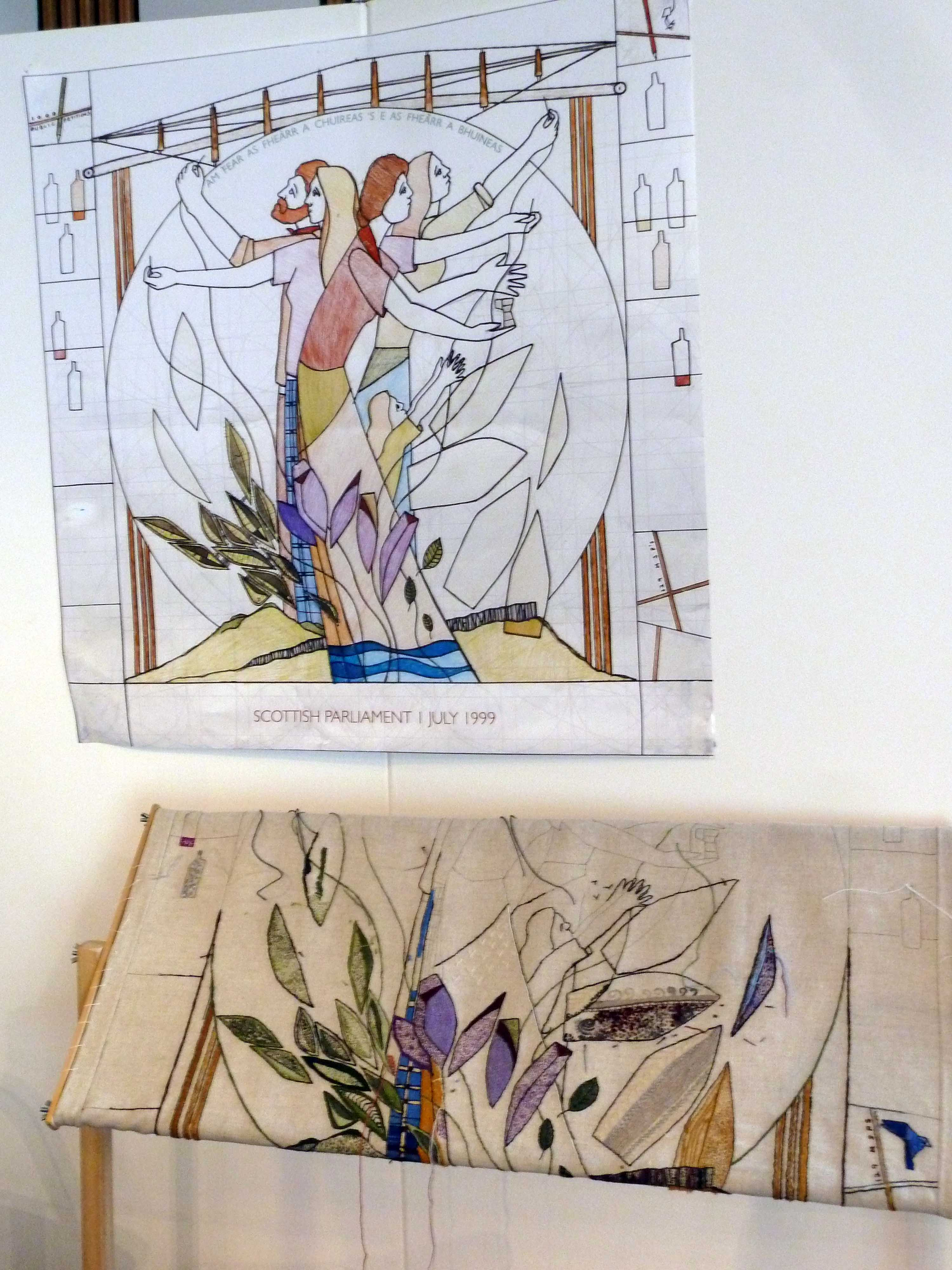
The Great Tapestry of Scotland: People's Panel designed by Andrew Crummy, during creation by exhibition visitors.

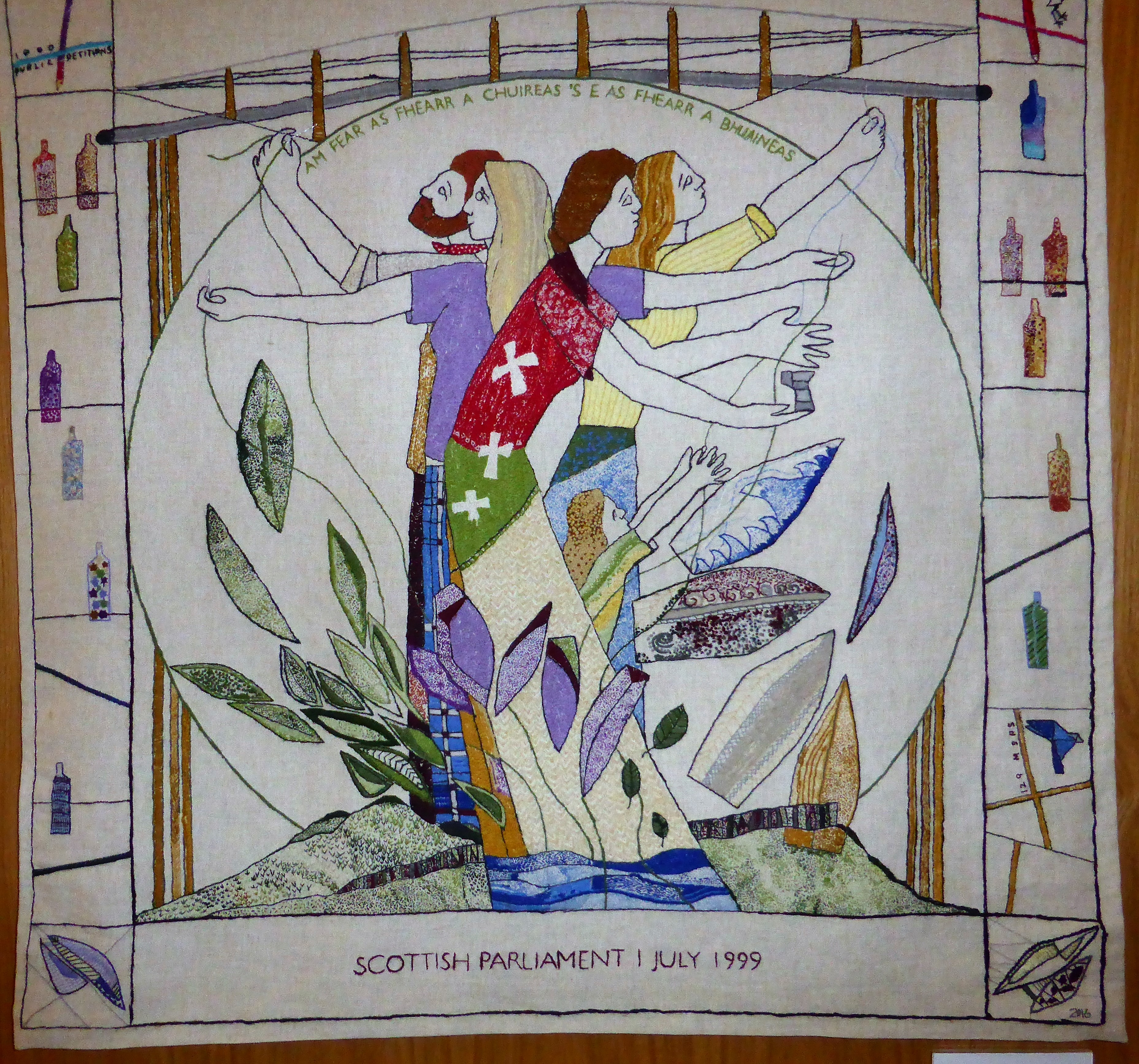
The completed People's Panel hanging in the Scottish Parliament.

The Great Tapestry of Scotland: People's Panel is a special panel designed by Andrew Crummy, started off by visitors to the Great Tapestry of Scotland Exhibition at the Scottish Parliament in the summer of 2014 (1 July – 13 September), each making a few stitches. It travelled with the tapestry until it was completed, when it was estimated that around 10,000 people had added stitches.

== Symbolism ==
The People's Panel represents the Scottish Parliament Building, the surrounding environment, and the people. It includes images of Arthur's Seat, Salisbury Crags, and the water of the lochs within nearby Holyrood Park; the upturned boat shapes from the roof of the Tower Building; the leaf shaped rooflights from the Garden Lobby; the people shapes from the Debating Chamber; the St Andrew's cross shapes of the Scottish flag from the vaulted ceiling of the Main Hall; The Skating Minister shapes of the office windows of the MSPs. The oak poles which feature on the exterior of the building (and are also represented in concrete and in metal railings) also appear. The figures represent the stitchers of the Great Tapestry of Scotland, launched in the Parliament in September 2013.

== Text ==
The text at the top of the panel, "Am fear as fheàrr a chuireas 's e as fheàrr a bhuineas" means "He who sowest best reapest best". It represents the quotations to be seen on the Canongate Wall at the foot of the Royal Mile (this one in Torridonian Sandstone – Ullapool, Highlands; there are other quotations carved into rock from other parts of Scotland).

== Materials ==
The linen-cotton union fabric is made by Peter Greig and Company (Scottish Linen), Victoria Linen Works, Kirkcaldy, Scotland and the two ply crewel wool is dyed and spun by Appletons, Buckinghamshire, England.

== Launch ==
The panel was launched at the Scottish Parliament on 9 March 2016, unveiled by Presiding Officer Tricia Marwick MSP. It can be seen in the Parliament's Main Hall, accessible to all visitors free of charge.
