= Scottish Diaspora Tapestry =

Large embroidery completed in 2015

The "Welcome Panel", used as a logo on the tapestry's official website

The Scottish Diaspora Tapestry (Scottish Gaelic: Grèis-bhrat Diaspora na h-Alba) is a large embroidery, 153 metres (502 ft) in length, crafted from 305 panels that were embroidered in 34 countries. It was the second major tapestry project to have originated from the Prestoungrange Arts Festival in Prestonpans, East Lothian, Scotland. Work on the panels began in 2012. A version of the tapestry was exhibited across Scotland in 2014 for the Homecoming. The tapestry was displayed in locations around Western Europe the following year. November 2015 was the first time that all 305 panels were shown together. In 2016 and 2017 the tapestry toured across Australia and Canada and returned to Edinburgh to go on display in May 2017.

== Design ==
The original plan was for a tapestry consisting of 150–160 panels, each measuring 500mm x 500mm in size. Research was conducted across the globe by Gillian Hart and Yvonne Murphy; panel were then designed and drawn by artist Andrew Crummy, who had previously designed and drawn the 104 metre Prestonpans Tapestry and the Great Tapestry of Scotland. Arran Johnston is a historian who was involved with the project and the tapestry tour director. The panels were planned to come together to form a work 90 metres in length.

== The stitchers ==
Initially, communities were identified in 25 countries to which Scots had emigrated. Groups of volunteers were approached to hand-stitch panels that documented their Scottish connections. By the end of the project panels were stitched by communities in 34 countries: Argentina, Australia, Antarctica, Brazil, Canada, Chile, China, Ethiopia, England, France, Germany, India, Italy, Ireland, Jamaica, Lithuania, Malawi, Netherlands, New Zealand, Northern Ireland, Norway, Pakistan, Palestine/Israel, Poland, Portugal, Russia, Sri Lanka, South Africa, Sweden, Taiwan, Tristan da Cunha, the United States of America and Zimbabwe. There was also a reverse diaspora, created to recognise the Italian and Asian communities who have settled in Scotland. Although people with a range of skills took part, it was estimated that it took at least 200 hours to stitch each panel.

A range of historical events are represented in the tapestry, many showing Scotland from the perspective of explorers and emigrants. Thirty-five panels were given to Canadian volunteers, with Prince Edward Island having five of these. Four panels were stitched in Victoria, British Columbia.

The project was supported by £120,000 from Prestoungrange Arts Festival, £80,000 from Creative Scotland, £44,000 from Homecoming 2014, £25,000 from Bòrd na Gàidhlig and £102,000 from the Scottish Government. The great majority of this project's £1 million costs including the global tour has, however, been met by committed volunteers and in kind donations.

== Exhibitions ==
In June 2013, the first completed panels were unveiled as part of the annual Three Harbours Arts Festival in Prestonpans. The tapestry first went on display in Prestonpans on 31 May 2014, then in Stirling. By August 2014 there were 200 completed panels which went on display in Edinburgh. It then was taken around Scotland to Paisley, Helmsdale, the Royal National Mòd in Inverness, Wick. It then was exhibited in Doncaster and Corby in England.

The tapestry began a global tour in May 2015 in Bergen, Norway. In June it was exhibited in Veere in the Netherlands. It then was shown in Barga and Picinisco, Italy and in Boussy and Paris, France. In November 2015 all 305 panels were exhibited together for the first time in Goolwa, South Australia. The tapestry went on to Adelaide, Hobart Tasmania, Albury, Wangaratta and Sydney before going to Otago/ Dunedin in New Zealand in April 2016. The tapestry has been shown in North America throughout 2016 arriving first in Victoria BC, then Winnipeg, Montello Wisconsin, Scarborough/ Toronto, Charlottetown PEI, New Glasgow, Montreal for St Andrew's Day and Ottawa for Hogmanay and all January 2017 before returning via Iceland to Prestonpans. The Global Tour from October 2015 until February 2017 has been led by volunteer Jenny Bruce with stitching communities at each location hosting the exhibitions attracting more than 100,000 visitors. Its return exhibition in the UK, with all 305 panels for the first time, ran from March 20 to 29 April 2017 in Westminster Hall, Palace of Westminster. On 4 May it went back on display in Edinburgh. It is due to finally back to back to Prestonpans Community Centre June 3/ 11 during the 3Harbours Festival before display in Edinburgh and Crieff later in the year.

== Educational guides ==
Images of the entire tapestry are available to view gratis together with accompanying descriptions in English, Gaelic, French and Italian on the official website at the App Store (iOS) and Android App stores under the title Scottish Diaspora Tapestry. An Official Guide was produced in softback and hardback editions, available for purchase at the official website.

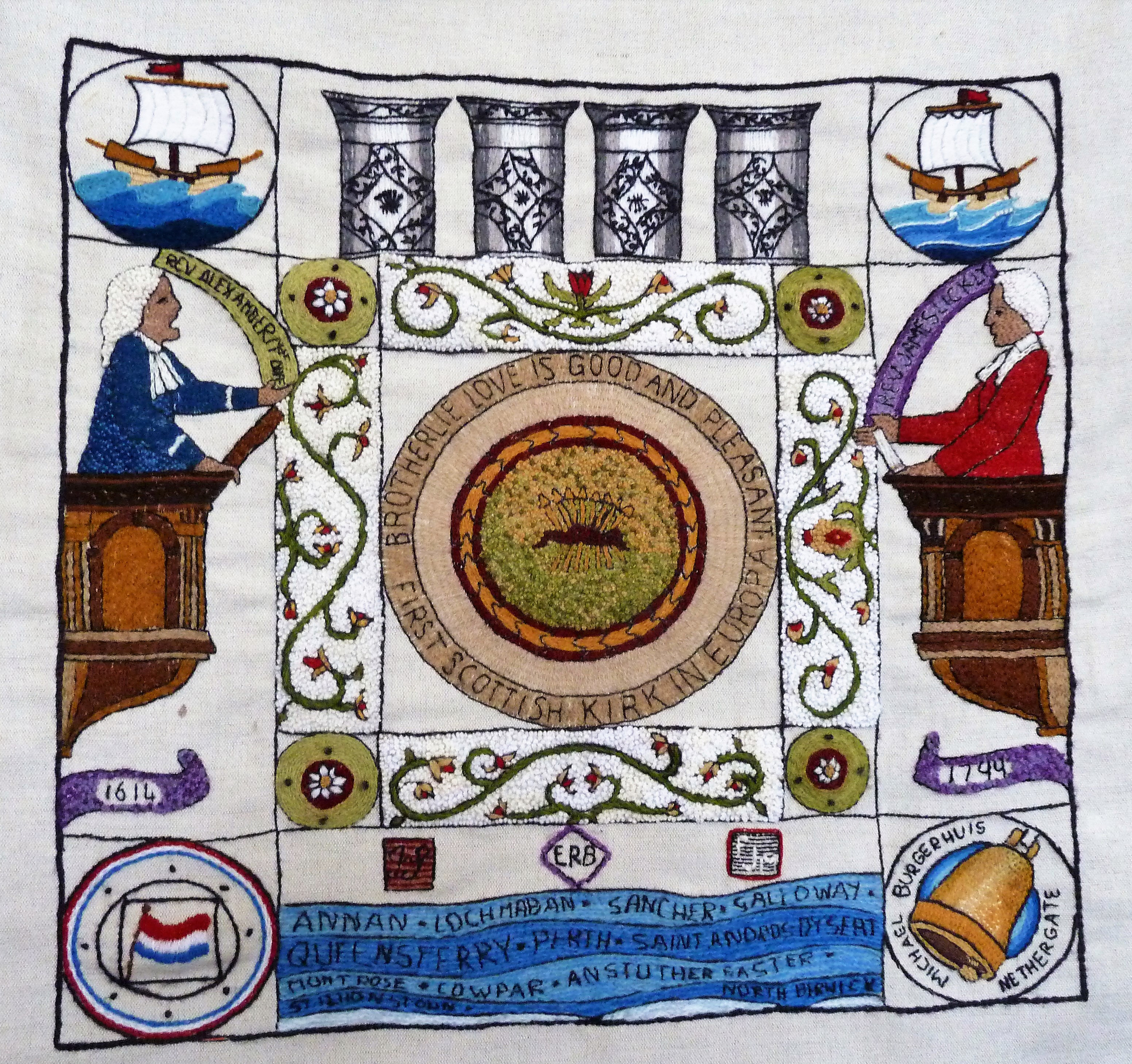
The Kirk panel (NL05) from the Scottish Diaspora Tapestry, stitched in the Netherlands

The first edition had only the initial 167 panels, the second edition was available from 31 May 2015 with all 305 panels. A Double CD of Diaspora Music to accompany the project was produced by Greentrax Recordings. A fascinating spin out book has now appeared from Rosemary Farmer & Maggie Ferguson, "The Art of Narrative Embroidery", which explores the many ways in which particular images have been stitched taking examples for both the Scottish Diaspora and the original Battle of Prestonpans tapestries.

== The Kirk panel theft ==
On the afternoon of Sunday 7 May 2017 The Kirk (NL05) panel was stolen from St Giles' Kirk on the High Street in Edinburgh where the tapestry was being exhibited. A man removed the panel and made off with it. Appeals were made for information about the thief and for its return. The panel was stitched by Ilse Loos-Simpelaar, Patricia Quist, Ellen Rijkse-Bliek, Ineke van der Gruiter, Elisabeth Dolleman, Dorothée Sybenga in the Netherlands.

On 24 May 2017 the panel was returned to the police by the unknown thief. Included was a letter of apology for stealing it.
