= Prestonpans Tapestry =

Scottish embroidery created in 2010

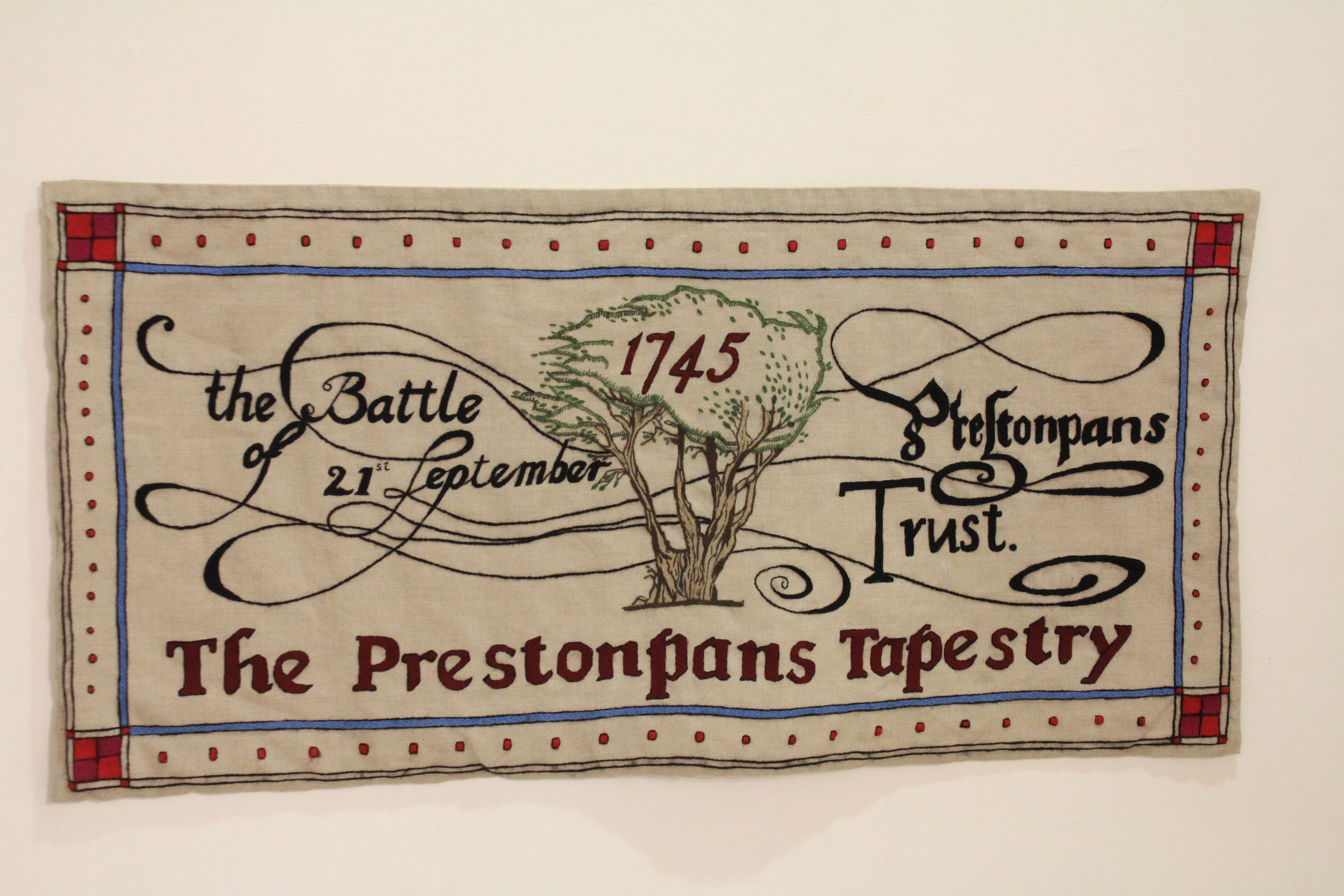
The first embroidery of the Prestonpans Tapestry

The Battle of Prestonpans Tapestry 1745, or simply the Prestonpans Tapestry, is a large embroidery created in 2010 in Prestonpans, East Lothian, Scotland. It depicts the events before, during and after the Battle of Prestonpans on 21 September 1745, when Bonnie Prince Charlie's Jacobite forces triumphed over the Hanoverian Army led by Sir John Cope. The design, size and style were inspired by the Bayeux Tapestry.

== Description ==
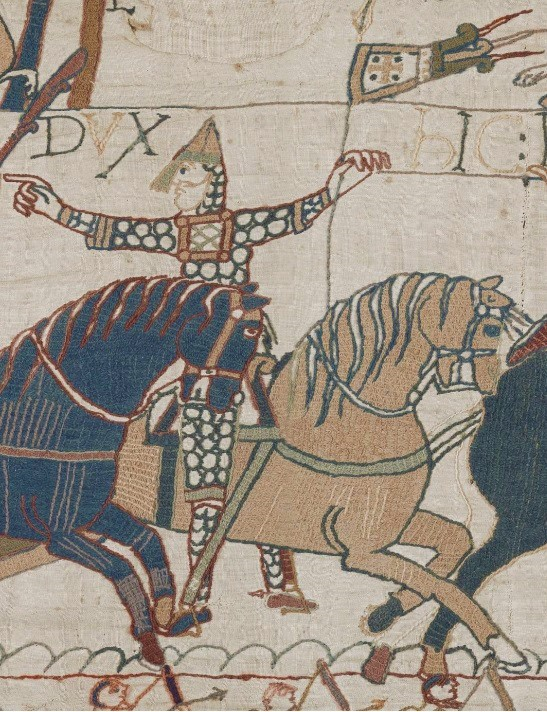
Part of the Bayeux Tapestry

The Tapestry is, like the Bayeux Tapestry, an embroidered cloth, rather than a true woven tapestry. It is annotated in English but an animated DVD is also available in French and text materials in French and Gaelic. More than two hundred embroiderers created the work over a two-year period; more than half these reside in Scotland from the places where Bonnie Prince Charlie marched to his victory. Other embroiderers with family links come from as far as the US, Australia and New Zealand. The complete artwork measures 104 metres (341 ft), and consists of 103 panels, each one metre long and 500mm high. It is about 30 metres (98 ft) longer than the Bayeux Tapestry.

== Design and execution ==
The tapestry was the brainchild of the Prestoungrange Arts Festival, the Battle of Prestonpans 1745 Heritage Trust, the Founding Chairman of the Trust (Dr Gordon Prestoungrange, Baron of Prestoungrange), and the designer Dr Andrew Crummy. Historical and architectural advice was obtained from Professor Martin Margulies, Arran Johnston and Gareth Bryn-Jones. The embroiderers were led by Dorie Wilkie.

The completed work was unveiled to a private gathering of 500 of the embroiderers and their friends on 26 July 2010, at The Greenhills near Cockenzie Power Station, which is on the edge of the Prestonpans battlefield itself.

== Exhibition ==
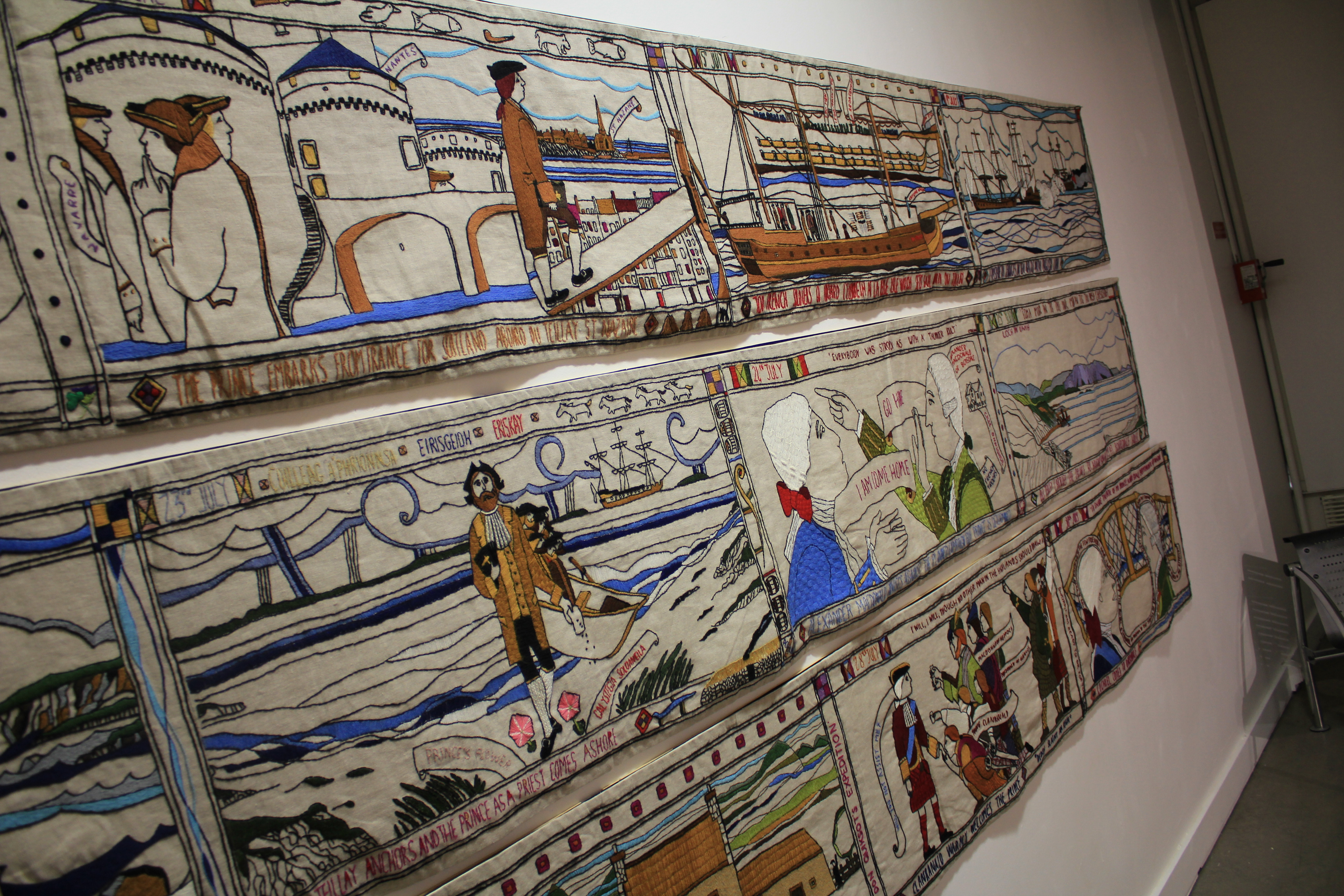
Exhibition at the Festival Interceltique in Lorient in Brittany in France in 2017.

Since its creation, the Tapestry has travelled around the Highlands and Lowlands, and to England and France, attracting over 150,000 visitors in its first two years.

Exhibitions have included the Scottish Parliament and the Scottish Storytelling Centre, St. Mary's Cathedral, Edinburgh, to coincide with the Edinburgh Festival in 2011 and 2012, Alexandra Palace in London and Pornichet, St Nazaire, in France (from where the Prince embarked to launch his campaign in 1745). In September and October 2013 it was exhibited in Bayeux by invitation of the museum holding the tapestry that was its inspiration.

Exhibitions have continued across Scotland and in June/July 2017, after more than 500,000 had seen the artwork, it was displayed in the Scottish Parliament followed in August by exhibition at the Festival Interceltique in Lorient in Brittany.

The Battle of Prestonpans [1745] Heritage Trust expects to be able to find a permanent home within the next five years that will also be a "living history centre" for all other aspects of the battle and a hub for a nationwide and international Jacobite Trail.

== Successor works ==
After seeing the Prestonpans Tapestry, Alexander McCall Smith commissioned the Great Tapestry of Scotland. Designed by historian and co-chairman Alistair Moffat and artist Andrew Crummy, with contributions from approximately 1000 stitchers from across Scotland, it depicts the history of Scotland from prehistoric times until the present day. The longest tapestry in the world at that time, it was unveiled at the Scottish Parliament on 3 September 2013 where it hung for 3 weeks.

More recently, the Scottish Diaspora Tapestry has been developed by the Prestoungrange Arts Festival, with support from the Scottish Government, Bord na Gaidhlig, Creative Scotland and Homecoming 2014. Dr Gordon Prestoungrange led a team across the globe to embroider the tapestry, telling stories from 34 countries where Scots have settled. Andrew Crummy was again the designer. It was exhibited throughout the 2014 Year of Homecoming in Scotland, at locations in Scotland, England, Norway, the Netherlands, Italy, and France. In 2016–17 it toured in Australia, New Zealand, Canada, the US and Iceland, before returning to be shown in London, Edinburgh and Prestonpans. It is intended that it will find a permanent home in Prestonpans alongside the Prestonpans Tapestry.
