= Niddrie, Edinburgh =

Suburb of Edinburgh, Scotland

Coordinates: 55°55′55″N 3°6′52″W

Niddrie
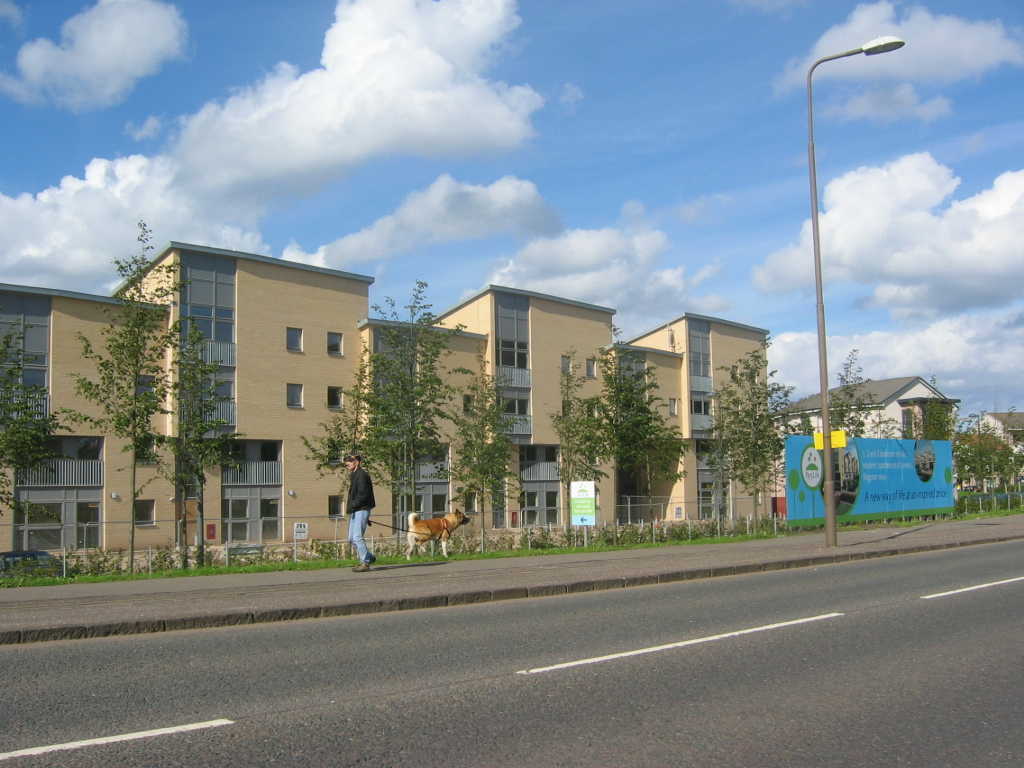

- Location within the City of Edinburgh council area Location within Scotland
- OS grid reference: NT296716
- Community council: Craigmillar
- Council area: City of Edinburgh
- Country: Scotland
- Sovereign state: United Kingdom
- Post town: EDINBURGH
- Postcode district: EH16
- Postcode district: EH15
- Dialling code: 0131
- Police: Scotland
- Fire: Scottish
- Ambulance: Scottish
- UK Parliament: Edinburgh East and Musselburgh
- Scottish Parliament: Edinburgh Eastern

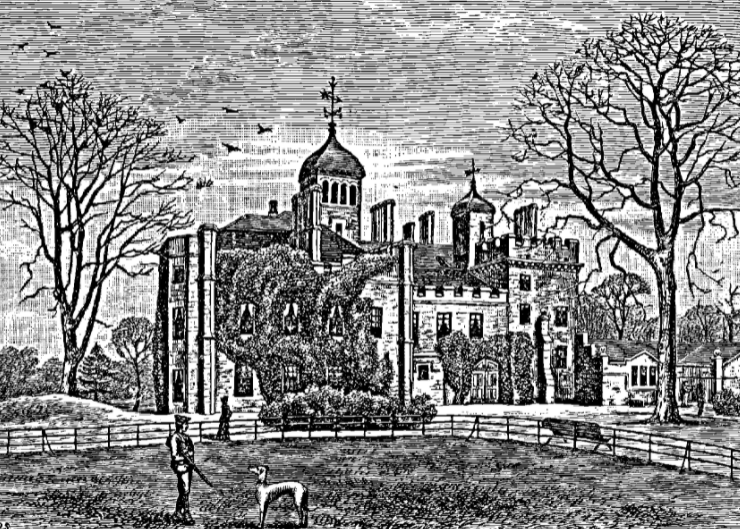
Niddrie House south of Edinburgh c. 1800

Niddrie (/ˈnɪdri/) is a residential suburb in Edinburgh, Scotland. It is situated in the south-east of the city, south-west of the seaside area of Portobello, and west of Musselburgh in East Lothian near Fort Kinnaird retail park. The western section of Niddrie is also known by the alternative name of Craigmillar.

== History ==
The place name is believed to be of Brythonic origin, *nowid treb meaning "new settlement". It was known historically as Niddry Marischal to distinguish it from several other nearby localities: Longniddry and Niddry Bents.

The Wauchope family owned the majority of the area up to the 1930s. Robert Wauchope, Archbishop of Armagh and Primate of Ireland, was born in Niddrie Marischal around 1500. In the 1590s Archibald Wauchope of Niddrie was a supporter of the rebel Earl of Bothwell. The family home Niddrie Marischal House was immediately west of the present-day Jack Kane Centre sports complex in Hunters Hall Park. The Wauchopes eventually donated their lands to the city.

In 1839 John Henderson designed the lodge and gates to the Mansion. The House was demolished although the vaulted tomb-house, which adjoined the western extension, remains as a listed building.

From the mid-19th century the area was developed by the family for coal-mining purposes with several pits being built and a great number of miners cottages were erected.

Social housing was built in Niddrie Mains by Edinburgh Corporation from 1927 until the mid-1930s, under the designs of City Architect, Ebenezer James MacRae. The new housing was linked to a major slum clearance scheme in the St. Leonard's Ward of Edinburgh. Families from these cleared areas were housed together with local coal mining families from Niddrie.

The Niddrie Mains council housing estate is now almost completely demolished, with very few of the buildings surviving. The land has been mostly redesignated for private rather than social housing.

The site is currently being developed by PARC, an ALMO or arms-length management organisation, fully owned by the City of Edinburgh Council. The development includes a new primary school for the surrounding area, with the old Niddrie Mill Primary School and St Francis Primary School being put on a joint campus. The first, though unassociated, phase of redevelopment in the Niddrie Mains area was the Hays area, constructed around 2001 and consisting of two-storey blocks with gardens and pedestrianised streets.

== Crime ==
Between the 1980s and 2000s, Niddrie suffered from a high crime rate. Antisocial behaviour is fairly common, though gang fights and knife crime are of a lesser degree today compared to the levels recorded between the 1980s and 2000s. During the 1980s, Niddrie was one of the most drug-riddled communities in Scotland, and still has problems with class A drug use today. For a number of years, the area has had problems with joyriding and youngsters stealing cars and motorbikes.

Episodes of public disorder have seen police and fire service personnel subject to attack.

During the bonfire night period in 2023, a police vehicle was struck by a Molotov cocktail in the area with gangs on motorcycles racing through the area "while fireworks were lobbed at the ground". Young people in masks were reported to be filming themselves using a "rocket launcher to shoot fireworks at police". In an effort to control the disorder several roads in the area were closed in the Hay Avenue area of the suburb and police became involved in a stand-off with around 100 youths on the Sunday night. On 5 November 2023 the BBC reported that "about 50 young people have clashed with riot police in Edinburgh with fireworks and petrol bombs being thrown directly at officers".

Similar events were repeated on the 31st of October in Niddrie and other neighbourhoods the following year, with buses and police vehicles targeted with bricks and fireworks, leaving a police officer injured. The first Scottish Firework Control Zones were enforced from November 1st-10th in Niddrie, Balerno, Calton Hill and Seafield, banning unlicensed use of fireworks in these areas. Officers were once again targeted on bonfire night, with one person later convicted under the Fireworks and Pyrotechnic Articles (Scotland) Act of 2022.

== Demographics ==
Ethnicity	Portobello/Craigmillar Ward	Edinburgh
White	85.0%	84.9%
Asian	7.5%	8.6%
Black	3.0%	2.1%
Mixed	2.2%	2.5%
Other	2.2%	1.9%

== Transport ==
Niddrie once had its own railway station, on the Edinburgh and Dalkeith Railway. Today the nearest stations are at Brunstane and Newcraighall, both located on Edinburgh Crossrail and Borders Railway.

Lothian Buses provide 8 buses to the area:

2 Hermiston Gait - Broomhouse - Saughton - Gorgie - Haymarket - Grassmarket - Southside - Prestonfield - Niddrie - Asda

- Evening Buses terminate at Broomhouse Roundabout

14 Muirhouse - Granton - Pilton - Ferry Road - Leith - Elm Row - North Bridge - Southside - Prestonfield - Niddrie - Greendykes

21 Royal Infirmary - Niddrie - Portobello - Leith - Ferry Road - Silverknowes - Davidsons Mains - Clermiston - Sighthill - Gyle Centre/Clovenstone

30 Queen Margaret University - Fort Kinnaird - Niddrie - Prestonfield - Southside - Princes Street - Longstone - Wester Hailes - Clovenstone

46 Rosewell - Bonnyrigg - Dalkieth - Danderhall - Royal Infirmary - Niddrie - Fort Kinnaird - Stoneybank - Musselburgh

48 Gorebridge - Mayfield - Dalkieth - Danderhall - Royal Infirmary - Niddrie - Fort Kinnaird - Stoneybank - Musselburgh

400 Edinburgh Airport - Gyle Centre - Wetser Hailes - Colinton - Oxgangs - Kaimes - Royal Infirmary - Niddrie - Fort Kinnaird

N30 Westside Plaza - Baberton - Clovenstone - Longstone - Princes Street - Niddrie - Queen Margaret University - Stoneybank - Musselburgh

== Community Arts ==
Immediately adjacent to Craigmillar, and part of Edinburgh City's political ward Craigmillar/Portobello, it was also the home of the Craigmillar Festival Society, a community arts organisation, founded by local mother and "Woman Of Achievement" Helen Crummy.

== See also ==
- Baron of Niddrie Marischal
