= Castlebrae Community High School =

Castlebrae Community Campus

Location
- 99 Niddrie Mains Rd; Edinburgh, EH16 4DT; Scotland
- 55.93350987617405°N 3.1363691006613568°W

Information
- Religious affiliation: Non-denominational
- Local authority: City of Edinburgh Council
- Headteacher: Rob Greenaway
- Gender: Mixed
- Age: 11 to 18
- Houses: Blackford, Calton, Pentland
- Colours: Black, red and white
- Website: castlebraechs.wordpress.com

Castlebrae Community Campus is a secondary school located in Craigmillar, Edinburgh, Scotland. It was opened in 1976 and was later closed and relocated in 2022 next to Craigmillar Library.

== Feeder schools ==
Castlebrae is a part of feeder primaries, which are schools that help primary school students transition from primary to secondary schools. The nearest feeder primaries are Castleview, Niddrie Mill and Newcraighall.

== School houses ==
In Castlebrae, pupils are divided into three house groups, Blackford, Calton and Pentland. These are named after the hills in and around Edinburgh, and for the first few years of high school are placed together in mandatory classes.

== School opening ==
In 1976, Castlebrae was opened for the first time with the former Prime Minister James Callaghan attending. During the opening there was a protest against the tax cuts in education and the rise of unemployment.

In April 2022, the new proposed school was opened. Over £28 million had been spent on the construction. This school building was to have a school roll of 700, but can be expanded to over 1,200 students.

== Protests ==
In 1976, there were protests concerning the tax cuts on education and the rise of unemployment. The protest was held at the school due to the former Prime Minister James Callaghan attending its opening.

In September 2012, it was announced that City of Edinburgh Council proposed to close the school in June 2013 because of falling rolls (fewer than 200 pupils) and poor exam results. A group of local parents and pupils contested the closure. In February 2013, a report recommended closure, with a new school to be built in the next ten years as the area regenerates and demand builds. In March, the council voted to give the school a "reprieve".

== Controversy ==
In June 2014, the previous head teacher was suspended while allegations against him were investigated. Norma Prentice took over for 2014-15 as the investigation continued. In 2015, it was confirmed that Prentice would continue permanently, and that Curran had been dismissed.
