= Craigmillar Festival Society =

Former organisation from Edinburgh, Scotland

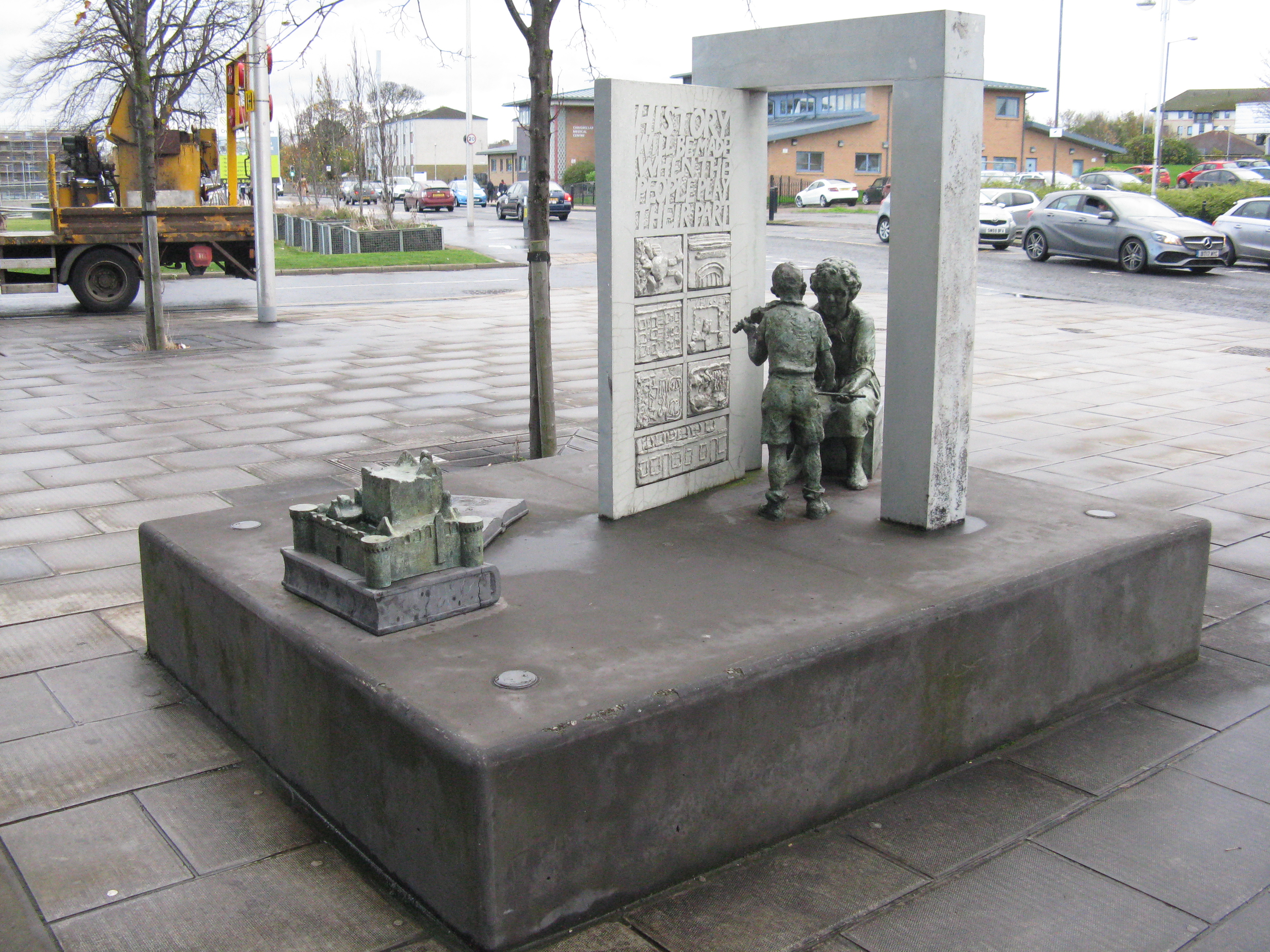
Helen Crummy memorial statue depicting the story that began the Craigmillar Festival Society.

The Craigmillar Festival Society (CFS) was a community arts organisation in the Craigmillar area of Edinburgh, Scotland, that ran from 1962 to 2002. It is regarded as an important contributor to the Community Arts Movement. Many of its productions from 1967 onwards involved Craigmillar Castle.

== Inception ==
The Craigmillar Festival Committee was established in 1962 by a mothers group at Peffermill Primary School, on the south-east side of Edinburgh. The Festival celebrated local talent with the support of local councillor Jack Kane. Kane became councillor of Craigmillar in 1949 and he served as the first chairman of the Craigmillar Festival Society, remaining its honorary president until his death in 1999.

In the 1960s, Craigmillar was one of the most socioeconomically deprived public housing estates in the East of Edinburgh. Helen Crummy, a local mother, asked the headteacher of Peffermill Primary School if her son could have lessons to learn to play the violin. Reportedly, the school replied, "It takes us all our time to teach these children the 3Rs, far less music." Crummy joined the Peffermill School Mothers Club and she wanted to showcase that the Craigmillar children had talent to develop and decided to put on a festival. Peffermill School Mothers Club responded by knocking on doors, pulling out local talent, and staging a People's Festival of music, drama, and the arts. Crummy explained that "the headmaster said 'sure, it's a good idea, I will show you how to do it. I will not do it for you.' And I think that has been the key, showing us how to do it but we did it ourselves and we've done it since."

One of the first events organised by Crummy and other mothers in the group was a Craigmillar Pageant, which focused on Craigmillar Castle. As a result of this success, the annual Craigmillar Festival was created and it was central to transforming the area's local art and music scene.

== Growth and development of the Craigmillar Festival Society ==
In 1969, following the introduction of the Urban Aid Programme by the British government in 1968, Craigmillar Festival Committee gained official recognition, charitable status, and changed its name to the Craigmillar Festival Society (CFS).

The CFS started with five paid neighbourhood workers, who would be a point of contact for advice and support in the Craigmillar community, and they also made referrals to social services, for example. They initiated different social clubs, for instance, a lunch club and one for those who were housebound and socially isolated. Neighbourhood workers were also involved in activities during the Festival such as the grammar group and pantomimes.

In early 1970 CFS also began publishing a newsletter – Craigmillar Festival News – which, after a somewhat uncertain start, grew into a monthly local newspaper which continued with few interruptions until its final edition cover-dated March 2000, surviving for almost exactly 30 years. Successor publication Craigmillar Chronicle (later The Chronicle) ran from June 2000 to early 2011.

The principles of the CFS were instituted in a Comprehensive Plan for Action in 1976, a document that became a standard guide for social community enterprise; One that placed art and culture at the centre of regeneration. Indeed, by 1976 the CFS had received a major anti-poverty research grant by The European Community.

One example of a popular initiative led by the CFS was the Bingham Belles. In 1970, neighbourhood worker Claire Elder developed the Belles into a drama and music group who would perform at the Festival's Old Tyme Musical Hall. The popularity of this group helped raise awareness about the needs of Bingham, and led to the successful campaign for maintaining local facilities such as a community centre and youth centre for Bingham.

The activities of the CFS continued all-year round but the annual summer Festival was a major cultural event in Craigmillar. The beginning of the annual Festival was marked each year by a political musical theatre performance written by local people about major social issues affecting them.

== Achievements ==
Many artists, politicians, and researchers came to Craigmillar, either to see or become involved in the community activities. The CFS is thought to be an inspiring influence in the creation of similar national and international community initiatives. These include: The Easterhouse Festival Society, Notting Hill Carnival, and also in the work of Neil Cameron and Reg Bolton in Australia. Craigmillar Festival Society helped create many things, amongst them The Mermaid Sculpture by Pedro Silva, The Gentle Giant Sculpture by Jimmy Boyle, The Bill Douglas Trilogy, and in particular "My Childhood" (funded by British Film Institute).

Since its conception, the CFS was involved in government employment training schemes. Speaking in a community-led documentary by the CFS in 1991, training manager Tom Farmer explained "we've always tried, and mostly succeeded, to deliver quality schemes. In the last few years, the funding for these government training schemes has been cut dramatically but even so the Society has still succeeded in placing over 100 people per year into full-time employment. At the moment, the Society runs an innovative 'YtE Unify' scheme, the first of its kind, I believe, in Scotland, where we bring both adult and youth trainees together in workshops and projects. We cover through this Unify scheme, joinery training in our own workplace in Castlebrae business centre."

The Craigmillar Festival Society was the recognised leader in the production of The Community Musical theatre productions, where professional actors worked very closely with local people. In effect, since 1962, local people came together and produced well over 100 productions. From 1973's first Community Musical "The Time Machine", 1974's "Castle, Cooncil & Curse, 1975's "Time and Motion Man", 1976's "Willie Wynn", 1977's Culture Vultures" and 1978's "Oh Gentle Giant", to the 1980s with "Shoo", "For A' That & A' That", "Dampbusters" and "Watch It", the 1990s and "Fit For Heroes", "Kicking Up A Stink" and "In Your Dreams" and the more recent "Grease Niddrie Style". All included songs such as "Craigmillar Now", "When People Play Their Part", "Arled Bairn", "Candy Barrie" and "He Promised Me".

Many local people who began performing in Community productions went on to become successful professional performers, among whom are Alice Henderson and Johnni Stanton, who went on to form their own companies, but most notably, Faye Milligan (The Steamie), and James (Micky) MacPherson, who created the award-winning Edinburgh film company Plum Films .

The Craigmillar Festival (and CFS) were the subject of the documentary Arts: The Catalyst, The Craigmillar Story (2004) produced by Plum Films and directed by Simon Hynd. Commissioned by the Craigmillar Communiversity and funded by the Craigmillar Partnership, the film uses archival footage from the BBC and interviews with local people including Helen Crummy. The documentary developed out of the success of the Arts: The Catalyst, Craigmillar Exhibition at The City Arts Centre in 2004. The documentary was well-received and won The 2005 Saltire Society short documentary competition at the 2005 Edinburgh International Film Festival.

The society also has links with Professor Eric Trist and The Tavistock Institute, Billy Connolly, Richard Demarco, Anne Lorne Gillies, Joan Bakewell, Michael Marra, and Bill Paterson.

== Legacy and Recognition ==
The work of the CFS has been globally recognised, with distinguished commentators making reference to it. These include:

- The Social Impact of Participation in the Arts Seminar, 1997 at The House of the Art Lover, Glasgow, organised by Scottish Arts Council, chaired by Seona Reid, Director.
- Donald Campbell (Cities of the imagination/Edinburgh, 2003, Signal Books)
- Eric Trist (New directions of hope, 1979)
- Eric Trist QWL Quality of Working Life and the 80's (The Closing Address to the International Conference on QWL and the 80's, Harbour Castle Hilton, Toronto, 30 August – 3 September 1981)
- Rafael Ramirez (The Beauty of Social Organization, Accedo, Munich, 1991)
- Alan Barnett (Community Murals, The Peoples Art, 1984, Associated University Press)
- George McRobie (Small Is Possible, London: Jonathan Cape, 1981 — this is part of the E. F. Schumacher Small Is Beautiful trilogy)
- Alison Jeffers and Gerri Moriarty (Culture, Democracy and the Right to Make Art, 2017)
- Kenneth Calman (Arts The Catalyst, Craigmillar Communiversity Press, 2004)
- Charles Landry and Franois Matarasso (Art of Regeneration, Comedia, 1996)
- David Harding, Head of Environmental Art and Sculpture (1985–2001), Glasgow School of Art. (Art with People, AN Publications, 1994.)
- David Harding (Arts The Catalysts, Craigmillar Communiversity Press, 2004)

It has also been compared to The Peckham Experiment and Bromley by Bow Centre and The Healthy Living Centre concept. In recent years, The Bromley by Bow Centre has taken up The Communiversity concept to develop its education programme.

== Disbandment ==
In 2002, the CFS was disbanded and the final annual Craigmillar Festival occurred in the summer of 2002. In 2021 episode for the BBC Scotland show 'Our Story' journalist Mark Stephen speaks with those involved in the CFS and explains that the funding ended and each project was syphoned off into individual programmes, and they each fought for access to the same funding.

== 'Craigmillar Now' ==
The legacy of the CFS lives on in the form of 'Craigmillar Now', an arts and heritage organisation developed in 2020. Founder Rachel Cloughton explained that "the project aims to preserve and celebrate the area's pioneering history and create a resource that is locally led and nationally significant."

The Craigmillar Festival was revived in 2021.

== See also ==
- Community art
- Not-for-profit arts organization
- Niddrie, Edinburgh
