= Craigmillar =

Area of Edinburgh, Scotland

Coordinates: 55°55′54″N 3°08′26″W

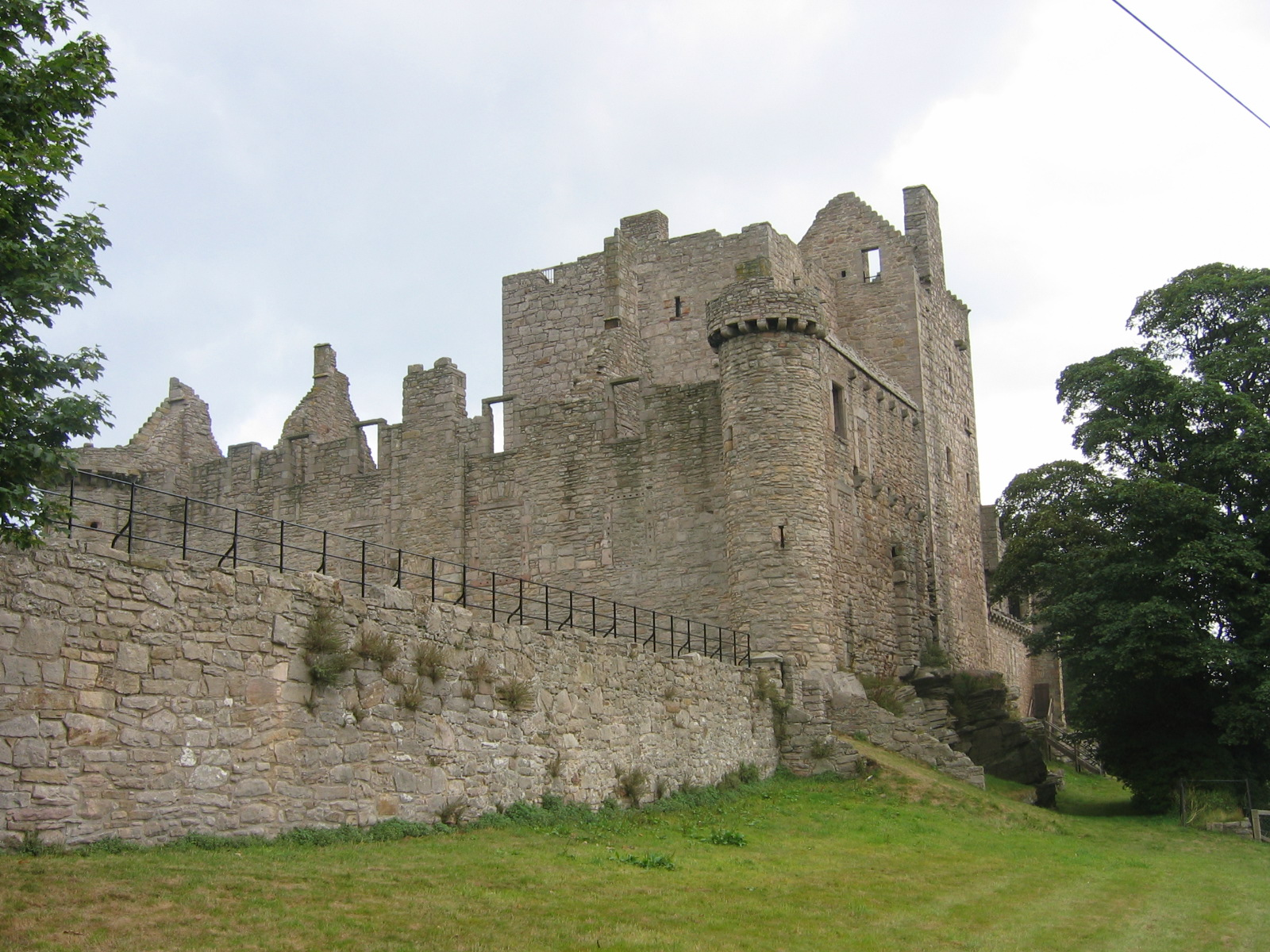
- Craigmillar Castle

- Location within the City of Edinburgh council area Location within Scotland
- OS grid reference: NT288713
- Civil parish: Liberton
- Council area: City of Edinburgh
- Country: Scotland
- Sovereign state: United Kingdom
- Post town: EDINBURGH
- Postcode district: EH16
- Dialling code: 0131
- Police: Scotland
- Fire: Scottish
- Ambulance: Scottish
- UK Parliament: Edinburgh East and Musselburgh
- Scottish Parliament: Edinburgh Eastern, Musselburgh and Tranent

Craigmillar (from Gaelic Creag a' Mhaol Àird, "rock of the bare summit") is an area of Edinburgh, Scotland, about three miles (five kilometres) south east of the city centre, with Duddingston to the north and Newcraighall to the east.

== History ==
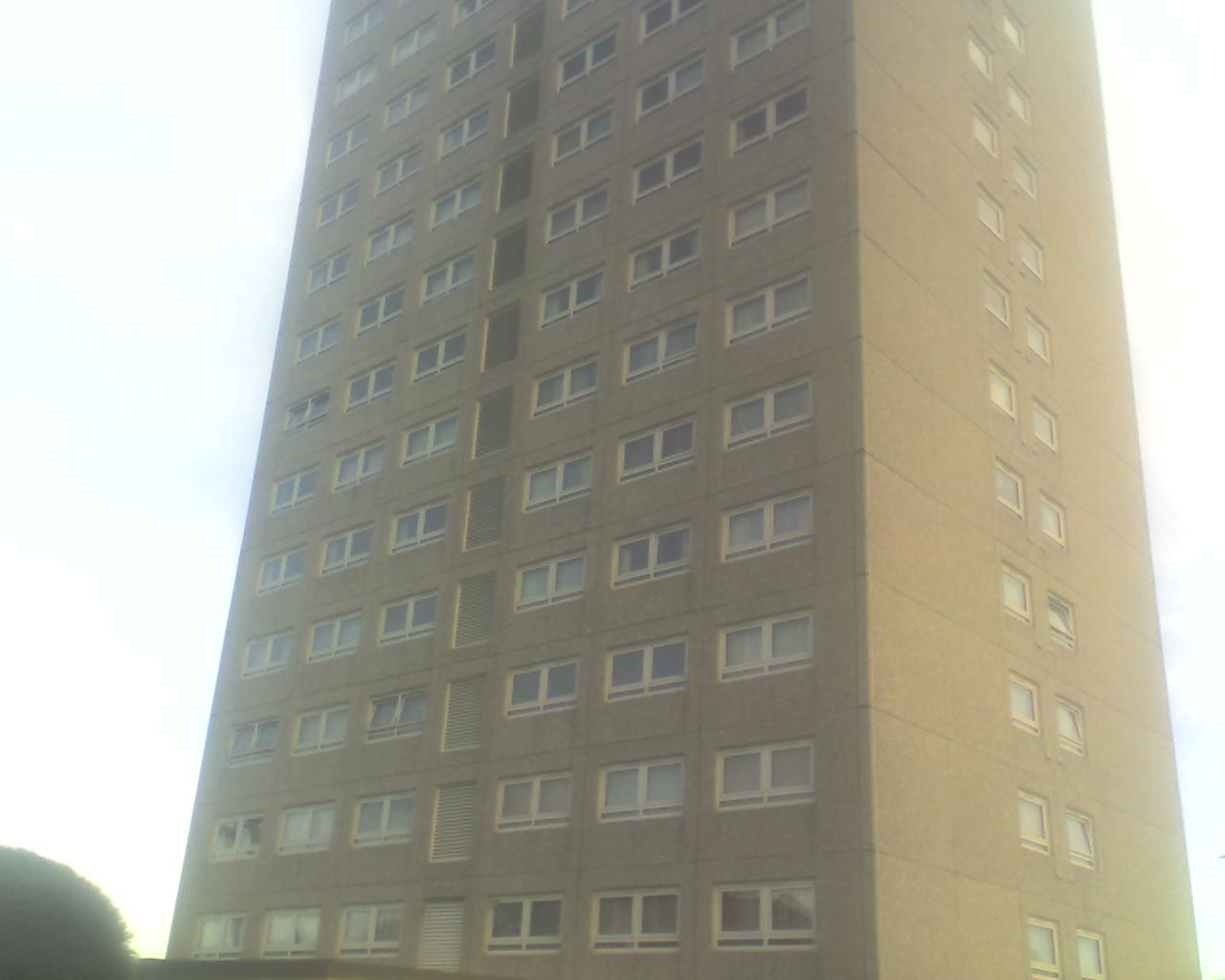
Peffermill Court, one of two 14-storey tower blocks in Craigmillar Castle Gardens

Despite the relative modernity of most of the housing in the area, the settlement of Craigmillar itself is very old, and contains Craigmillar Castle. The castle was begun in the late 14th or early 15th century, and was occupied until the early 18th century. In 1660, the Craigmillar estate was bought by Sir John Gilmour of Craigmillar.

The housing scheme at Niddrie Mains was created through the Housing (Scotland) Act of 1924, with lands bought from the Wauchope Estate. The ancient heart of the estate, Niddrie Marischal House, survived for a few years before being demolished, but an C18th mausoleum formerly attached to the house survives off Niddrie Marischal Terrace. The Niddrie Mains area was designed and laid out by the then City Architect, Ebenezer James MacRae from 1927. The separate Craigmillar estate, immediately below the castle, was planned in 1936, largely by the architect Thomas Smith. By 2000 the area consisted mainly of high-density inter-war and post-war public housing schemes, ranging from 1920s tenements to high-rise tower blocks. After 2000, the City of Edinburgh Council decided to demolish, rather than refurbish, around 2000 homes in Niddrie Mains, with only a handful of dwellings and two interwar listed schools being retained. At the same time much of the interwar Craigmillar estate was either demolished or refurbished.

The late 19th and early 20th centuries saw seven breweries being built in what was open country at Craigmillar/Duddingston, concentrated in a small area beside the railway line and taking advantage of the local aquifers providing excellent water for brewing. The first of these was the Craigmillar Brewery of William Murray & Co. Ltd built in 1886 and followed within a few years by Andrew Drybrough's brewery, also called the Craigmillar Brewery (1892), the Duddingston Brewery built by Pattisons Ltd (1896), bought by Robert Deuchar Ltd in 1899 following Pattisons' liquidation, the North British Brewery (1897) which was taken over by Murray's in 1927 becoming known as Murray's No. 2 Brewery, Maclauchlan's Castle Brewery, Raeburn's New Craigmillar Brewery and Paterson's Pentland Brewery, all opening in 1901. These breweries stopped brewing at various times, mainly in the 1960s, but Drybrough's survived for several years and ceased brewing in January 1987.

Between 1945 and 1950 the Thistle Foundation, a housing complex for disabled ex-servicemen was built, being designed in a traditional style by architects Lorimer & Matthew. Its centrepiece is the A-listed Robin Chapel built between 1949-52 in a Scottish Arts and Crafts style by the architect John F Matthew to commemorate Robin Tudsbury.

== Historical maps ==
In 2009 The National Library of Scotland released maps for the Craigmillar Area

- Ordnance Survey 1:10,560 Sheet IV SW, 1909 Shows detail of Niddrie House, Waterfall, Icehouse, Niddrie Stone 1909.
- Ordnance Survey 1:10,560 Sheet IV SW, 1938 Shows the development of Niddrie Main 1938.
- Ordnance Survey 1:10,560 – Air Photos – Sheet NT 27 SE 1946 and NT 37 SW, 1946 Shows the aerial photos from 1946
- Other georeferenced historical maps of Craigmillar from the mid 18th to the mid 20th centuries

== Present day maps ==
OpenStreetMap volunteers completed OpenStreetMap Craigmillar in January 2009.

== Facilities ==
Craigmillar saw riots in the 1980s, amid complaints about the lack of facilities in the area. Both the library and Arts Centre were won by grassroots-based community action trying to tackle the area's social problems. One such venture was the Craigmillar Festival Society, which was active from 1962 until 2002.

The area also had a large concrete sculpture/play-structure, created by artist Jimmy Boyle called Gulliver, The Gentle Giant that cares and shares. It was built for the Craigmillar Festival Society in 1976, and largely demolished in 2011 when the Niddrie Burn was re-routed through Hunter's Hall Park, the remaining portion being listed in 2023. The University of Edinburgh has playing fields in this area, including one of the oldest modern-style shinty fields in Scotland.

Gulliver was considered a geoglyph.

== Regeneration of Craigmillar ==
The area has benefited from many initiatives aimed at tackling the social deprivation that has characterised the area for many years, and a new 'town centre' is being brought back to the main street, Niddrie Mains Road, with a new library, secondary school and shops. The area occupied by the Council housing in Niddrie Mains is gradually being rebuilt with new housing. An ambitious plan to re-develop parts of Craigmillar is underway. The Scottish Government's "Green Quarter Plan" proposes the creation of several new parks and woodland areas throughout the Craigmillar area. The "Green Quarter Plan" is being undertaken by the Parc life development company. They also propose the development of 3,200 affordable houses to rent and improved learning and leisure facilities for young people.

One of the few retained buildings of significance is "The White House" former public house, an Art Deco listed building which was restored with gallery space inside in 2011.

== Demographics ==
| Ethnicity | Portobello/Craigmillar Ward | Edinburgh |
|---|---|---|
| White | 85.0% | 84.9% |
| Asian | 7.5% | 8.6% |
| Black | 3.0% | 2.1% |
| Mixed | 2.2% | 2.5% |
| Other | 2.2% | 1.9% |

== Transport ==
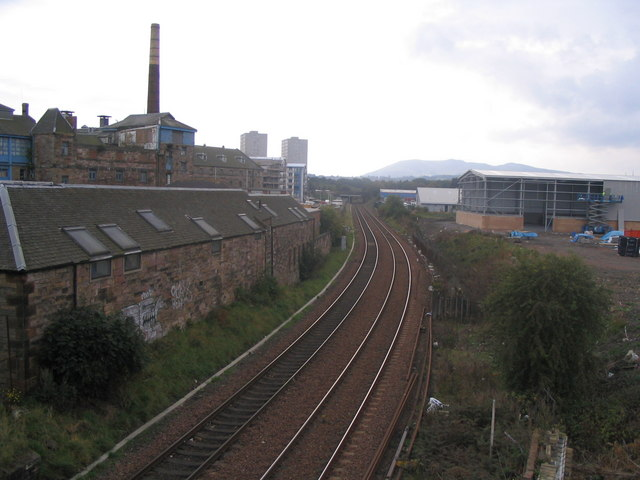
The Edinburgh Suburban railway

Craigmillar is served by Lothian Buses service 12 which runs from Portobello to The Gyle Shopping Centre, service 2 from The Jewel, Asda, to Hermiston Gait Retail Park, service 14 from Greendykes to Muirhouse & Service 30 from Queen Margaret University to Clovenstone, Wester Hailes.

The area was once served by a local railway from Duddingston & Craigmillar railway station on the Edinburgh Suburban and Southside Junction Railway. The station closed in 1962, but local pressure groups are campaigning to have the line re-opened, possibly as an extension of the forthcoming Edinburgh Tram Network. Following a petition submitted to the Scottish Parliament in 2007, the proposal was rejected in 2009 by transport planners due to anticipated cost.

== Notable people ==
- Helen Duncan (1897–1956), the last woman to be imprisoned under the Witchcraft Act 1735, lived in Craigmillar.
- The former Craigmillar Primary School building houses a mural by the painter John Maxwell, who was trained by Fernand Léger and was a fellow student of Marc Chagall in Paris.
- There is a fine example of 20th century stained glass by Sadie Maclellan in Robin Chapel, in the Thistle Foundation, a housing complex for disabled people in the centre of Craigmillar.
- Local mother Helen Crummy was instrumental in the founding of the Craigmillar Festival Society in 1962.
- The noted Conservative politician Sir Ian Gilmour was given a life peerage by John Major in 1992, becoming Baron Gilmour of Craigmillar, of Craigmillar in the District of the City of Edinburgh, of which his family were, for several hundred years, the feudal superiors.
