= Fort Kinnaird =

Retail park in south-east Edinburgh, Scotland

Coordinates: 55°56′6.30″N 3°6′12.46″W

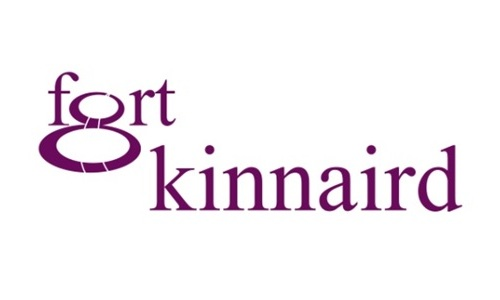
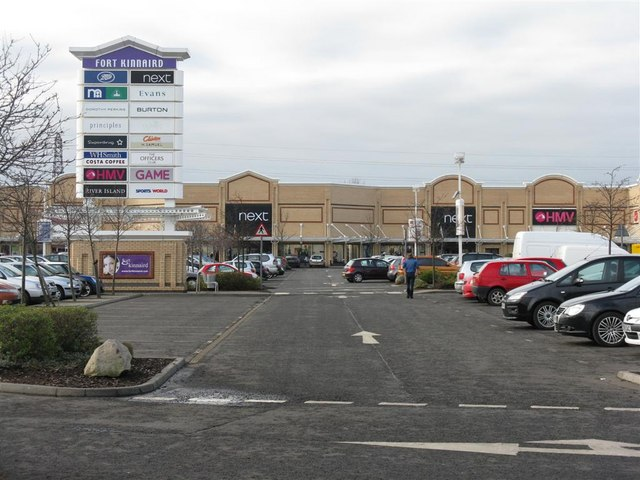
- Logo Entrance to Fort Kinnaird
- Location: Edinburgh, Scotland, UK
- Opened: 1989
- Manager: British Land
- Owner: British Land and M&G Real Estate
- Num. of stores: 70+
- Num. of anchor tenants: 5 (Marks & Spencer, Primark, TK Maxx, HomeSense & Next)
- Floor area: 560,000 sq ft
- Parking: 2,609 spaces
- Website: www.fortkinnaird.com

Fort Kinnaird is a large outdoor retail park in Newcraighall, in the south-east of Edinburgh, Scotland. Often known simply as "the Fort" to locals, it is currently the second largest retail park in the UK with 75 units occupied.

== History ==
Built on the site of the former Newcraighall Colliery, the retail park opened in 1989 as Craig Park. Edinburgh's very first multiplex cinema was opened at the park in 1990 by UCI Cinemas. Its name was later changed to Kinnaird Park.

Over the years, it has expanded into land surrounding the original footprint of the original Kinnaird Park, including the site of the former Niddrie Brickworks, which closed down in 1991. The site was branded separately as Edinburgh Fort. Eventually both sites were renamed under its current name in the late 1990s. In 2008, the cinema, which was now operated by Odeon Cinemas, along with Megabowl, the adjacent bowling alley, was closed down and demolished.

In late-2013 work started on a £24m extension to the park. It included 7 restaurants, a children's play area and a seven-screen cinema, which was built on the same site as the original cinema that had been demolished 5 years earlier. The cinema is once again operated by Odeon. The development was completed in March 2015.

In 2018, M&G Real Estate purchased the Crown Estate's 50% stake in the retail park for £167.25 million, forming a joint venture with The Hercules Unit Trust, the existing owners of the other 50%. The retail park has many high street brands such as Marks & Spencer, River Island, Primark, Next, Fatface, H&M, Mountain Warehouse and New Look.
