= Helen Crummy =

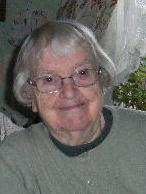
Crummy in 2010

Helen Crummy MBE (10 May 1920 – 11 July 2011) was a founder of the Craigmillar Festival Society, and served as the Organising Secretary for the group until 1985.

== Biography ==
Helen Crummy was born in Leith, Helen Murray Prentice. She became one of the first residents in a new council housing estate at Craigmillar in 1931 when her family moved to the estate which became one of the poorest areas of Edinburgh. Her family were also neighbours of the family of Jack Kane, the first Labour Lord Provost of Edinburgh.

== Craigmillar Festival Society ==
The Craigmillar Festival Society started in 1962, after she asked the headmaster of the local primary school if her son, Philip (who would later become Director of Archaeology at Colchester Archaeological Trust and also a recipient of an MBE), could be taught to play the violin. He replied by telling her that it took the school all its time to teach these children "all three R's". Helen with the local mothers group decided to show how talented their children were and started The Craigmillar Festival which grew to gain international acclaim.

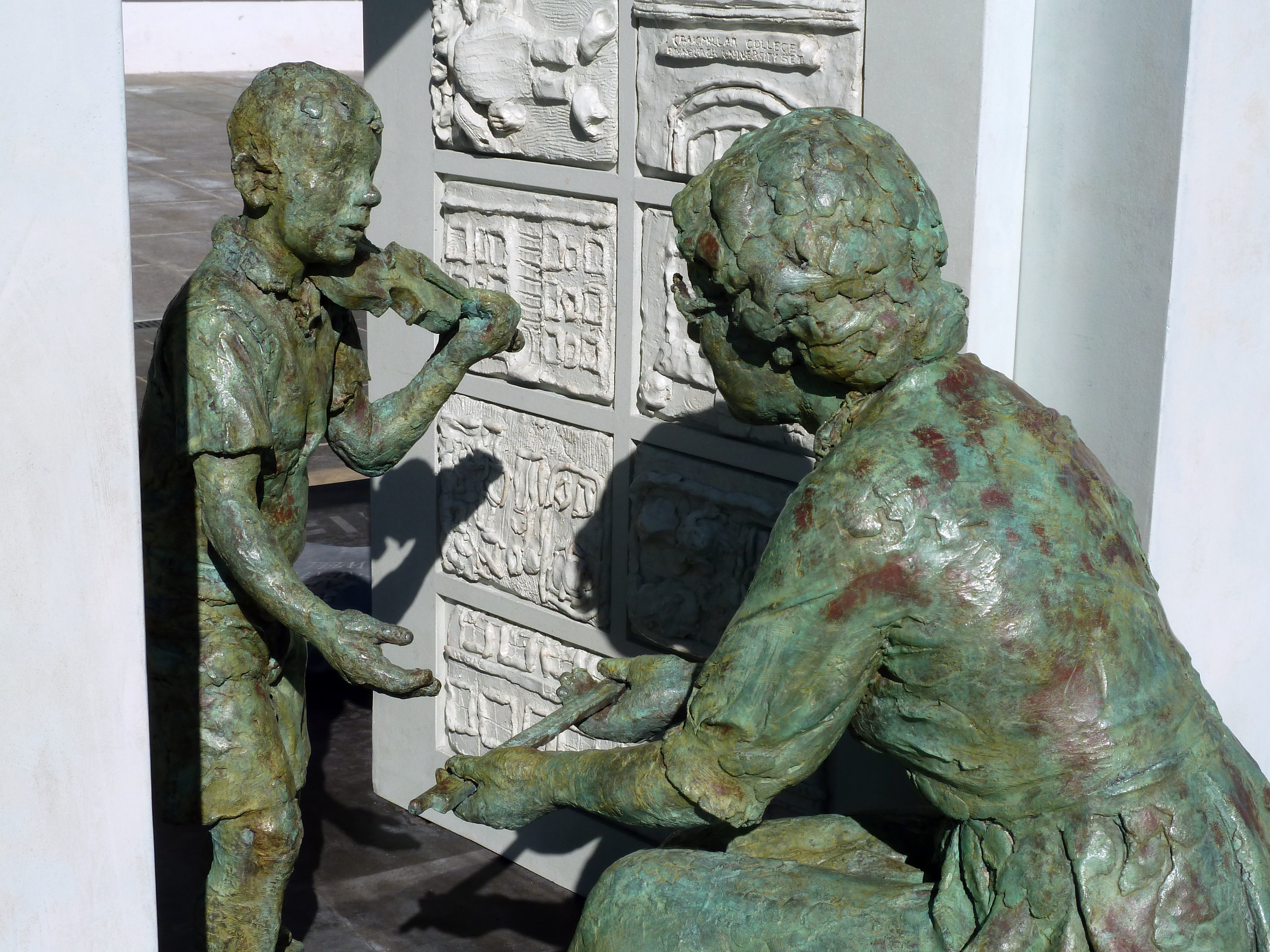
Statue in memory of Helen Crummy at Niddrie Mains Road, Edinburgh

Her youngest son is the artist Andrew Crummy, creator of the Great Tapestry of Scotland and her niece is the writer Janis Mackay.

== Honours ==
She was awarded an MBE in 1972, and an honorary doctorate by Heriot-Watt University in 1993, and is part of The Edinburgh Women of Achievement trail. She is also in the "Travelling the Distance" sculpture at The Scottish Parliament and mentioned in The Bill Douglas statue at Newcraighall Railway station. On 21 March 2014 a statue, created by Tim Chalk, in her memory was unveiled by Richard Demarco and Ruth Wishart outside the East Neighbourhood Centre on Niddrie Mains Road, Edinburgh.

== Publications ==
Her book Let The People Sing! has been sold in many countries. It tells the story of The Craigmillar Festival Society. Her third book is the novel Whom Dykes Divide, published in 2008. Other publications are "Mine a Rich Vein" 2003; essay and editing: Arts The Catalyst Catalogue, 2004; The Heritage and Arts Trail for Craigmillar, 2009; Edited with Douglas Galbraith: Craigmillar Gold, Community Musical songs, 2004. She was involved in most of the publications that came out of the Craigmillar Festival Society from 1962 to 1985, including "The Comprehensive Plan for Action" (CPA) 1976, which is recognised as a milestone in Community Planning.
