= Transport in Edinburgh =

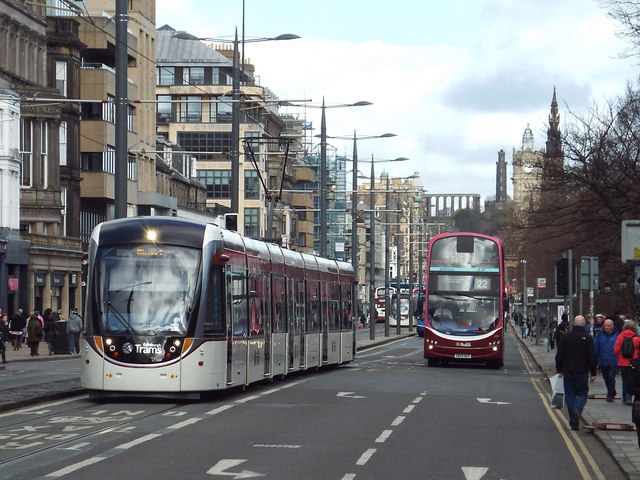
Trams and buses on Princes Street, one of the main thoroughfares in Edinburgh.

Map of tram and commuter rail services in Edinburgh

Edinburgh is a transport hub in east-central Scotland, linking road, rail and air networks within Scotland and to international destinations. The Scottish Parliament and Government have statutory authority to fund, regulate and oversee transport projects of national importance affecting Edinburgh. Transport for Edinburgh, an executive body of the City of Edinburgh Council, coordinates development and delivery of the city’s transport projects in partnership with major providers.

Edinburgh operates public transport services including buses, trams, and rail connections, though traffic congestion and transport project delivery present ongoing challenges.

== Airport ==
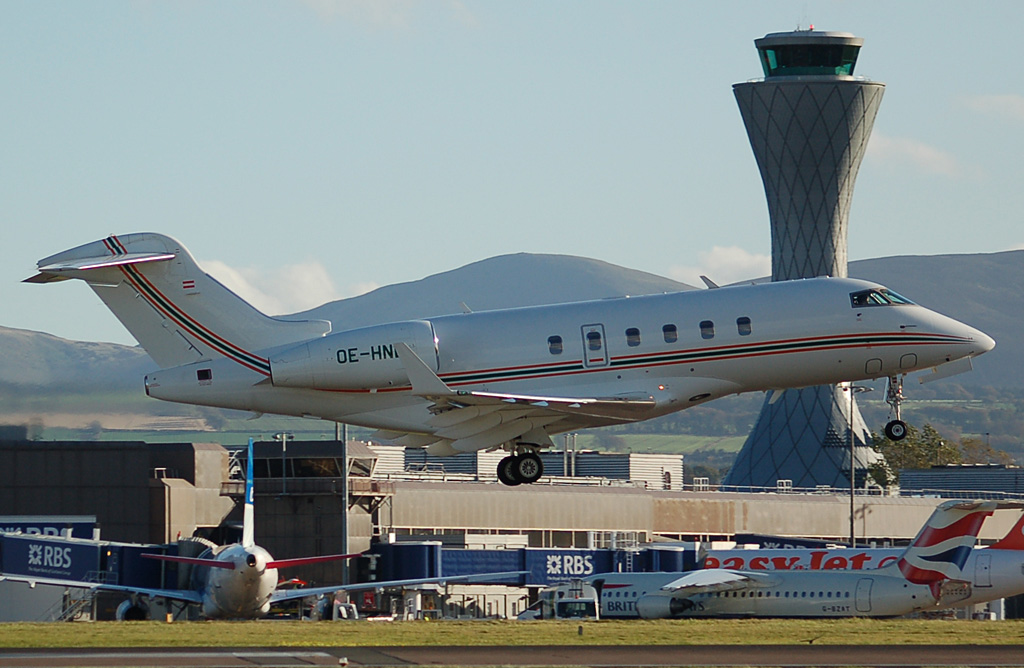
Edinburgh Airport main runway and air traffic control tower.

Edinburgh Airport is located 8 miles (13 km) west of the city centre on the A8 trunk road and serves as the main airport for the city, as well as the busiest airport in Scotland. Since June 2024, Vinci SA and Global Infrastructure Partners have jointly owned and operated the airport. The airport handles over 12 million annual passengers on domestic, European, transatlantic and Middle East routes.

Designed by Robert Matthew and built in 1977, the main terminal was significantly extended and modernized in the late 1990s. A £14 million international pier, completed in 2006, further increased the airport’s capacity.

A master plan for the growth of the airport was published in May 2005 indicating that the main terminal building will need to be increased in size, and that new aircraft hangars, maintenance facilities, and cargo handling facilities will need to be constructed. The possibility of a second runway built on land to the north of the current airfield, has been mooted, to cope with the forecast growth in air traffic. A new air traffic control tower was opened in October 2005.

Since May 2014, a tram link connects the terminal to the city centre; an express bus also runs from the terminal to Waverley Bridge.

== Bus transport ==
=== Bus services ===
Buses are the main means of public transport in Edinburgh. An extensive network covers the city, suburbs and wider Edinburgh region.

Lothian Buses operates the majority of local routes.

Formed in 1986 after deregulation under the Transport Act 1985, Lothian Regional Transport was rebranded as Lothian Buses in 2000. The City of Edinburgh Council owns 91% of Lothian Buses; Midlothian, East Lothian and West Lothian Councils hold the remainder. Lothian Buses operates the Airport Express shuttle and a network of night buses between midnight and 05:00.

Lothian Buses charges a single flat fare and offers day tickets for unlimited daytime travel. Daytime frequencies range from 10 to 30 minutes, with reduced service after 19:00.

Inter-city services are provided by companies such as Scottish Citylink. Scottish Citylink operates routes including Edinburgh–Stirling, Perth and Glasgow (900).

Edinburgh Bus Station is located on St Andrew Square in the city, but is not used by local services.

=== Bus corridors ===
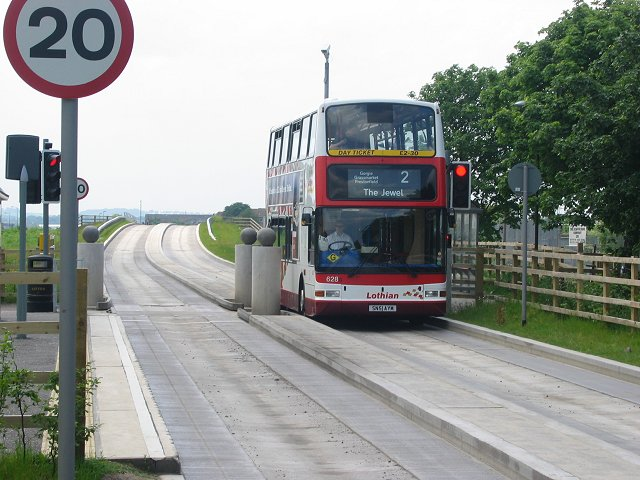
One of Lothian Buses fleet on a former "guided busway" in the west of Edinburgh. This has now been converted to a tram line.

From December 2004 to January 2008, a 1.5 km long guided busway - "Fastlink" - ran between the west Edinburgh suburbs of Stenhouse and South Gyle, parallel to the railway line from Haymarket to South Gyle. There were four passenger halts on the busway at Broomhouse East, Broomhouse West and Saughton East and West. Edinburgh Trams, from the city centre to the Airport, now run on the corridor previously occupied by the Fastlink guideway with stops at Saughton, Bankhead and Edinburgh Park Station.

Priority bus lanes on arterial routes into Edinburgh city centre, known as Greenways, because of the distinctive green tarmac used to surface them - were introduced in 1997. Currently the main Greenways into the city are on the following routes:

A8	Glasgow Road – Maybury to Princes Street
A900	Leith Walk – Leith to Princes Street
A702	Lothian Road – Leven Street to Princes Street
A70	Slateford Road – Inglis Green Road to Haymarket
A71	Calder Road – City Bypass to Ardmillan

A Traffic Regulation order bans general traffic from using these priority lanes during the day, restricting use to buses, taxis and bicycles. Red lines at the side of the road prohibit parking and stopping on Greenways as a measure to reduce the congestion faced by normal bus lanes caused by on-street parking. Most Greenways are operational between 07.30 and 09.30 and 16.00 to 18.30 Monday to Friday and 08.30 to 18.30 on Saturdays, with some exceptions. For example, on Glasgow Road, the Greenway is not operational at all on Saturdays and Sundays. On the main route into Edinburgh city centre from the west - the A8 - 55% of the 6.7 km route is inbound bus lane, whilst 54% is outbound bus lane. Lothian Buses is the main provider of bus services using the greenways scheme, with services every 12 minutes.

== Rail ==
=== Edinburgh Waverley ===
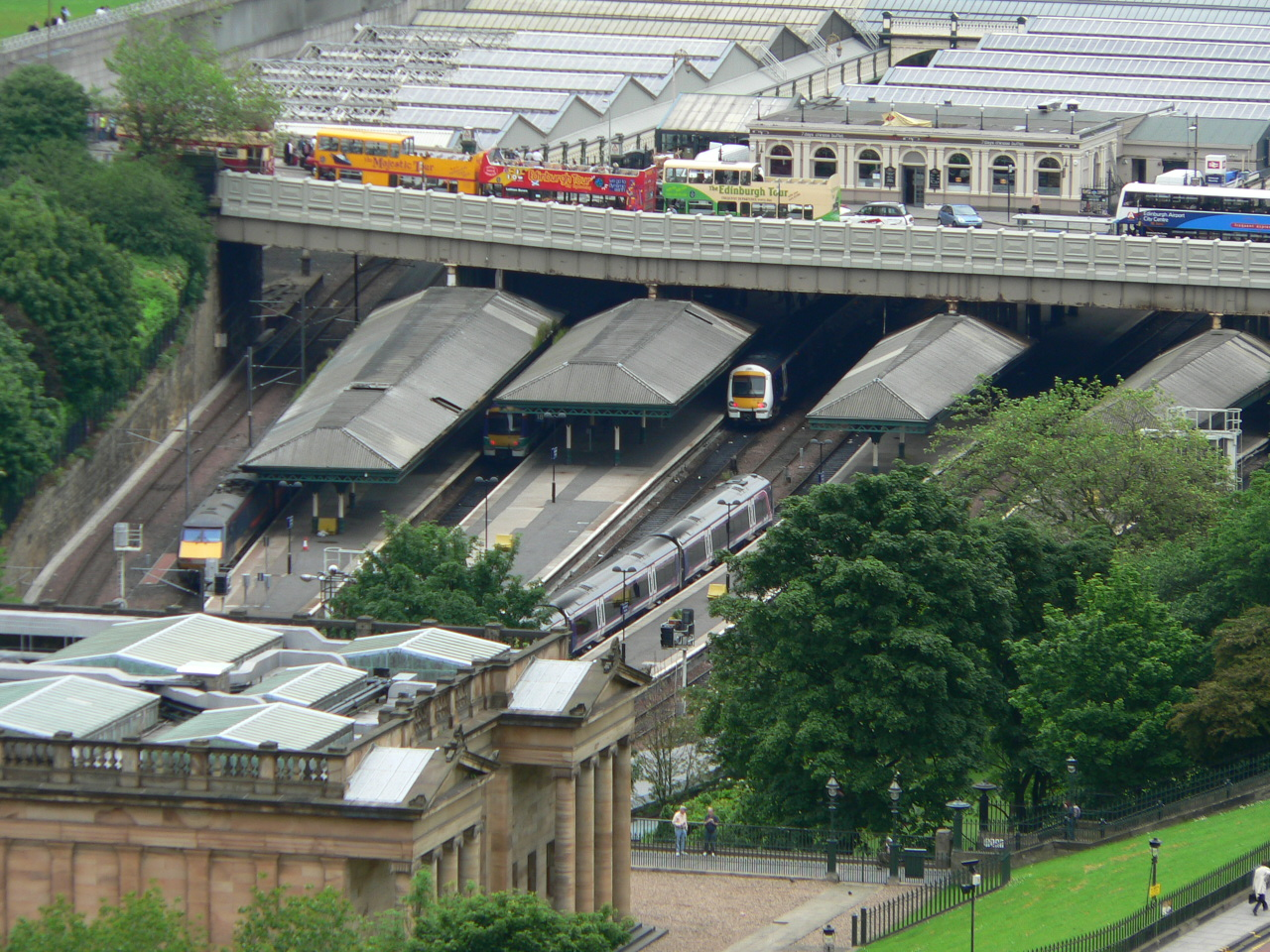
Edinburgh Waverley railway station - the principal mainline station in Edinburgh viewed from Edinburgh Castle.

Edinburgh Waverley is the main railway station serving the city. Located in a ravine in the heart of the city centre close to Princes Street Gardens, it serves over 14 million passenger journeys per year. It is a principal station on the East Coast Main Line between London King's Cross and Aberdeen, and is the terminus for a number of rail services within Scotland. London North Eastern Railway runs the main Edinburgh to London King's Cross route. ScotRail are the operating company for many routes within Scotland. Avanti West Coast, CrossCountry and TransPennine Express provide the remaining services to long distance destinations via the West Coast Main Line.

Trains leave Waverley in two directions:

- Eastward for the suburban services to the North Berwick branch line, and the East Coast Main Line to London King's Cross. The Borders Railway, which follows part of the former Waverley Route, was opened in 2015 and also enters Edinburgh from the east. This connects several towns in the Scottish Borders to the railway network.
- Westward the line runs through a cutting near the cliffs of Edinburgh Castle and through Princes Street Gardens. It then passes through a tunnel before emerging at Haymarket station. From there lines lead north to Fife, Dundee and Aberdeen over the Forth Bridge, west to Glasgow Queen Street railway station (via Falkirk High and Lenzie) or Glasgow Central (via Shotts or Carstairs, Motherwell and Cambuslang), north-west to Stirling, Dunblane and Inverness, and south-west via Carstairs to Carlisle and the West Coast Main Line. Another branch line runs westward from Newbridge Junction to the town of Bathgate. The section beyond Bathgate was reopened in 2011, connecting with the Glasgow suburban network at Airdrie and opening up a fourth railway link to Glasgow.

=== History ===
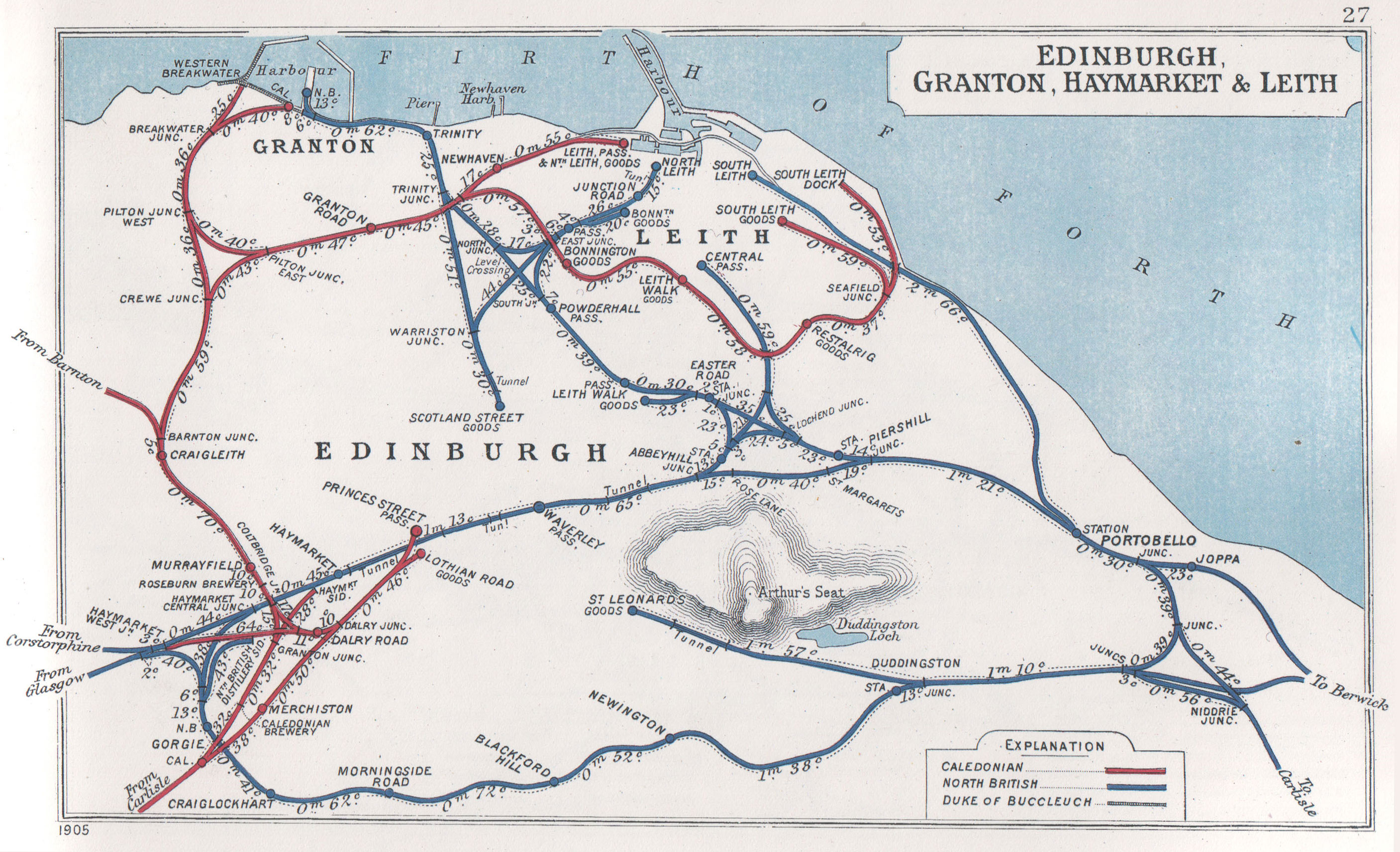
A 1905 Railway Clearing House diagram of Edinburgh railways

Edinburgh once had a well-developed rail network. It started with the Edinburgh and Dalkeith Railway, whose terminus was at St Leonards on the east of the Old Town, and the Edinburgh, Leith and Newhaven Railway (later the Edinburgh, Leith and Granton Railway), whose terminus was at Canal Street (on the site of today's Waverley Station). The Edinburgh and Glasgow Railway opened in 1842. By the mid-20th century, competition between the North British Railway and the Caledonian Railway, together with the conservatism of the city's local government, combined to make the network inefficient, with much duplication of routes. Most stations closed down and, following the Beeching Axe in the late 1960s, the city was left with only three passenger railway stations: Waverley, Haymarket and Slateford. The South Suburban line was left in place, mainly as a bypass for freight services to avoid the city centre.

New stations have since opened since the Beeching Axe: Brunstane, Newcraighall, South Gyle, Edinburgh Gateway station and Edinburgh Park in recent years. There are currently 12 stations within the City of Edinburgh council area.

=== Other stations and services ===
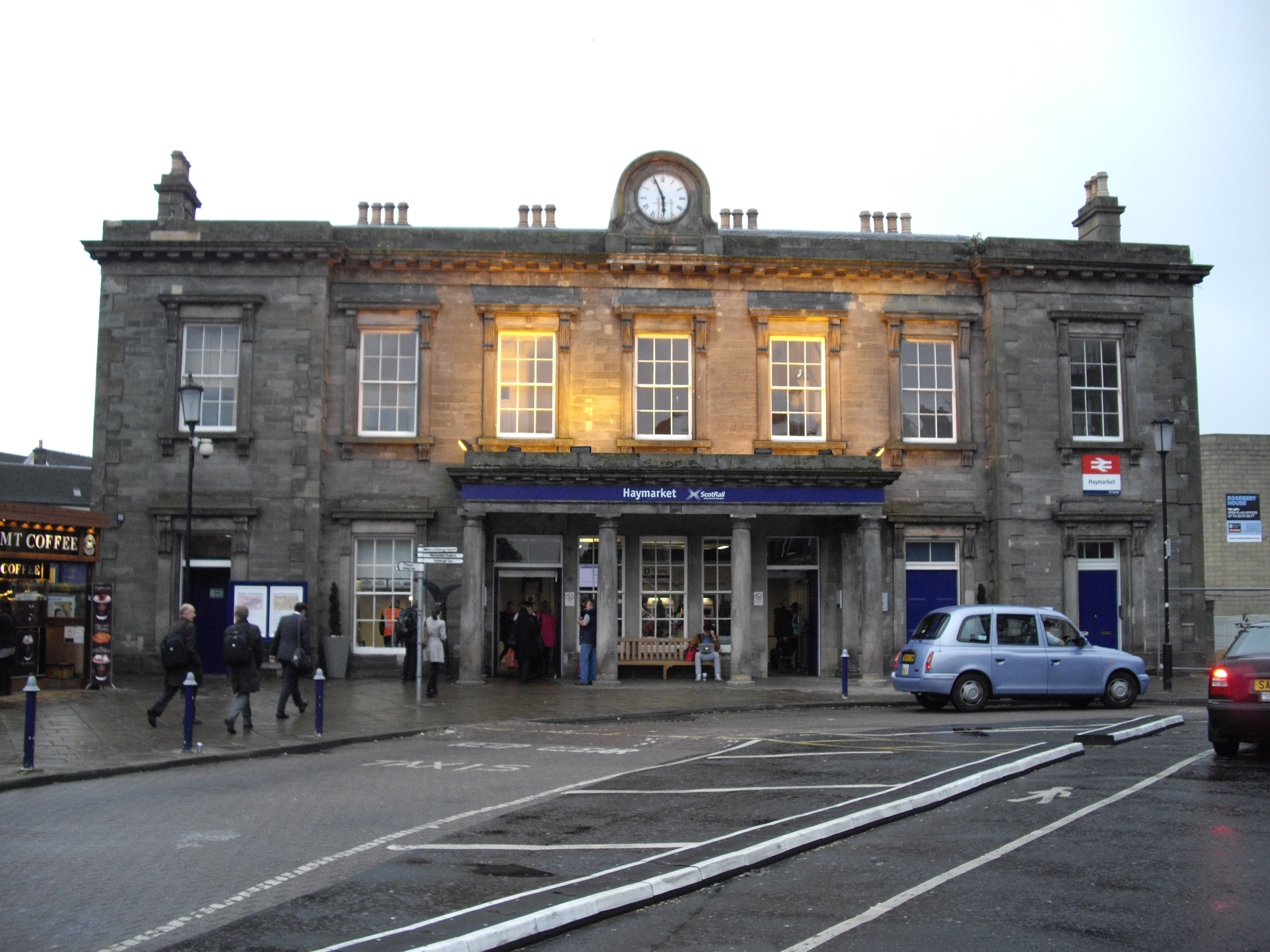
Haymarket railway station exterior

Edinburgh itself has a small suburban rail network. The backbone of the network is Edinburgh Crossrail, which was launched in 2002, It runs in an east-west axis across the city, linking Edinburgh Park in the west with Haymarket and Waverley in the city centre, and Brunstane and Newcraighall in the east. The other stations in the city are South Gyle, Dalmeny (for South Queensferry), Slateford, Edinburgh Gateway, Kingsknowe, Wester Hailes and Curriehill.

Haymarket railway station is the second largest station in Edinburgh. It is located in the west end of the city, an area of offices and businesses with the station being busy with commuters in peak periods. Haymarket was completely redeveloped in 2013, partly to meet the needs of disabled passengers. A new concourse and access bridge to the west of the original entrance was constructed; this has ten times as much public space as before, step-free access to all platforms, and direct access to the adjacent tram stop.

Edinburgh Gateway has an interchange with Edinburgh Trams in Gogar to provide a link to Edinburgh Airport.

=== Trams ===
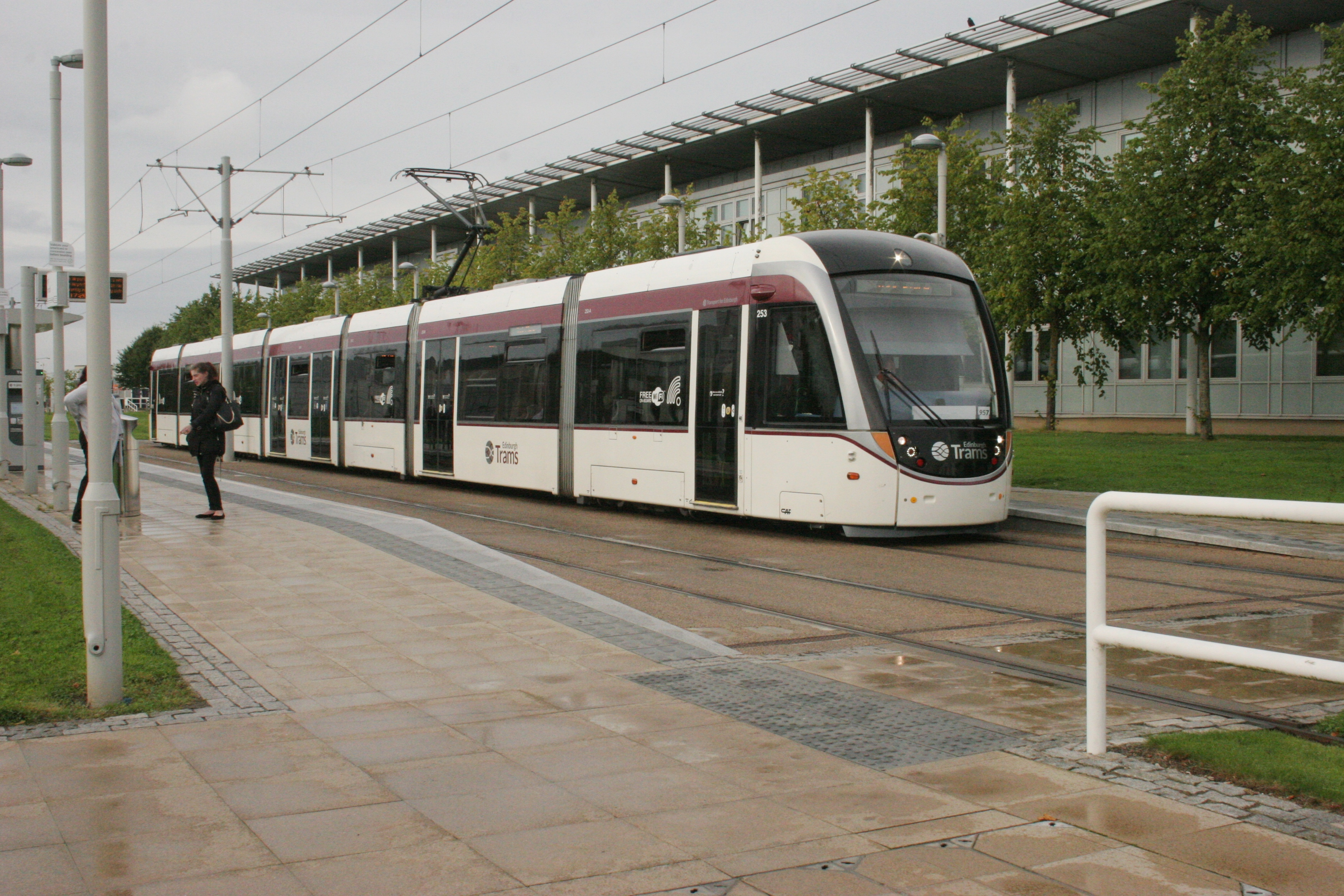
Tram at Edinburgh Park Central

The Edinburgh Trams is a light rail line which opened on 31 May 2014, connecting Edinburgh Airport on the western edge of the city, with Haymarket, Princes Street, St Andrew Square and York Place in the city centre. A further extension to the redeveloped waterfront areas of Leith, Granton and Western Harbour was shelved due to costs in 2011.

A few years after the trams started operation, approval was given for the existing line to be extended north onto Leith and Newhaven. The line opened to passengers in June 2023, adding a further eight stops.

The planning, design and construction of the tram network was originally overseen by the City of Edinburgh Council's wholly owned company Transport Initiatives Edinburgh. The Scottish Parliament gave legislative consent to the parliamentary bills, required for the project to commence, in March 2006. Construction of the network was originally scheduled to start in spring 2007, beginning with the repositioning of the network of gas and water mains that lie under the proposed routes. Work finally started in July 2007.

The scheme had been estimated to cost about £592m, with a contribution of £450m-£500m from the Scottish Executive and £45m from the City of Edinburgh Council.

In 2006, there was a controversy about the construction of the tram network, with worries over escalating costs and disruptions due to construction. Following a vote in the Scottish Parliament on 27 June 2007, it was agreed to continue with the tram project - despite the opposition of the SNP minority government.

== Road network ==
The Edinburgh City Bypass (A720) skirts the southern fringes of the city. The road was constructed between 1981 and 1990 and opened to motorists in sections. The road is one of the main trunk roads in east central Scotland linking vitally important routes such as the M8, the main route west to Glasgow, the A1, one of the two primary routes south from Scotland to England, and the M9 to Stirling. The City Bypass is linked by the A902 to the A90 leading north out of the city.

Edinburgh itself is the hub of the A-road numbering system within Scotland, and multiple radial routes lead into and out of the city. Routes radiating from Edinburgh are as follows (in a clockwise direction):

- A1 - to Berwick-upon-Tweed and over the border into England, continuing all the way to London.
- A68 - to Jedburgh then over the border into England as far as Darlington.
- A7 - to Galashiels and Hawick then on across the border into England as far as Carlisle.
- A701 - to Dumfries.
- A702 - to Carlisle (via A74(M)). The A702 itself continues beyond Abington to St John's Town of Dalry in Dumfries & Galloway.
- A70 - to Lanark and on via Muirkirk to Ayr.
- A71 - to Kilmarnock and Livingston
- A8 - to Glasgow (via M8) and Stirling (via M9). Beyond Glasgow, the A8 continues to Greenock and Gourock.
- A90 - to Queensferry Crossing, for access to Fife, Perth, Dundee and northwards to Aberdeen.

Construction of the Queensferry Crossing, adjacent to the Forth Road Bridge, began in 2011, and the new route was opened in 2017. To reduce traffic congestion, there are park and ride facilities at several points on the periphery of the city.

== Traffic congestion ==
Like many cities, traffic congestion is a significant problem in and around Edinburgh, with 160,000 vehicles entering the city every day which is forecast to rise to 180,000 by 2016. This is especially problematic in the rush hour periods from 07.30 to 09.30 and 16.00 to 18.00. Increasing levels of traffic congestion in Edinburgh are generally attributed to the city's strong population growth as well as an expanding economy. Areas in the future which are expected to suffer acutely from traffic congestion in Edinburgh include the western outskirts of the city, the waterfront, and the residential areas of the South East where there is a large amount of housing development. Notorious traffic hotspots in Edinburgh include the Straiton and Dreghorn junctions on the Edinburgh City Bypass. The Newbridge Roundabout on the A8 western approach to the city and the Gogar Roundabout close to Edinburgh Park are other bottlenecks in the west of the city which suffer from congestion. The office and business developments at Edinburgh Park themselves generate a large amount of traffic in that part of the city, with the new Royal Bank of Scotland headquarters opening at Gogarburn ensuring that upwards of 20,000 people now work in this area. In the city centre itself, narrow, cobbled and winding streets in the Old Town as well as increasing restrictions on vehicles entering the city and strict parking regulations mean that traffic hotspots are common in the city centre itself. Queen Street, Charlotte Square and the western end of Princes Street are areas of significant traffic delay.

=== Solutions ===
==== Park and ride ====
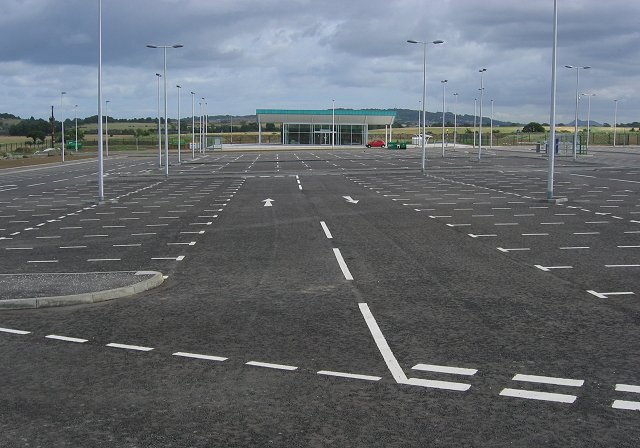
A park and ride facility at Ingliston near Edinburgh Airport, on the western outskirts of Edinburgh.

Park and ride facilities have been provided on the outskirts of the city, such as at Ingliston near Newbridge in the west of Edinburgh with spaces for 535 cars, as well as at Hermiston on the Edinburgh City Bypass, Newcraighall in the east of the city and at Ferrytoll in Fife. The schemes consist of large surface car parks off the main roads into the city where buses take passengers from these peripheral facilities into the city centre via a number dedicated stops, thus cutting down on the number of cars making the journey into the congested city centre. The Park and Ride facilities at Hermiston and Ingliston each serve more than 500 motorists per day, reducing car journeys into the city centre.

==== Edinburgh Congestion Charge ====
Following on from the implementation of the London congestion charge in February 2003, the City of Edinburgh Council announced plans to introduce a road tolls scheme to be put in place on main routes into the city. A postal referendum of Edinburgh residents was held between 7–21 February 2005, with 74.4% of those voting no, announced on 22 February 2005. The system would have operated in a broadly similar fashion to the one in London, with two cordons - an inner cordon and an outer cordon operating from Monday to Friday. A flat charge of £2 would have applied to vehicles entering the city boundary - by passing the outer cordon, or those entering the city centre by passing the inner cordon. This charge would have applied no matter how many times a vehicle crossed both cordons. Cameras with automatic number plate recognition technology would have been placed at the entry to both cordons, which would record the registration numbers of vehicles passing them. At the end of each day numbers would have been recorded against received payments. Paying would have been done electronically via the internet, text message or at specialised payment terminals in shops, where daily, weekly, monthly and yearly passes would have been available.

The proposal faced strong opposition from city centre retailers who were concerned about the impact it would have on their trade as well as a number of political parties. Following the no vote, the City council abandoned plans to introduce road tolls in Edinburgh.

==== Improvements to public transport ====
In an attempt to discourage car use and increase patronage of public transport - Transport for Edinburgh, the integrated transport delivery authority of City of Edinburgh Council, has embarked upon an extensive drive to improve public transport in the city. These include new railway stations, improvements to roads, pavements and footways, easier ticketing arrangements on buses, new bus shelters, pedestrian crossings and refuges, easy access buses, car parking payment by mobile phone and a real time bus tracker service in place at many bus stops and bus interchanges in the city. Recently the city has seen the introduction of the Edinburgh Trams, major improvements to Edinburgh Waverley including new platforms to cope with new routes and increased passenger numbers, a £25 million redevelopment of Haymarket railway station, as well as new railway lines opening to Airdrie and Bathgate, and from 2015 to Tweedbank in the Scottish Borders.

== Other transport ==
=== Cycling ===
As of 2023, 38% of households in Edinburgh own one or more bike (compared to 35% for the whole of Scotland), with 5% of journeys of two miles or less being made by bike (less than 1% for the whole of Scotland).

At present there are around 75 km of off-road cycleways in the Edinburgh area, with a similar length of on-road cycleways in the city. Greenways, which are the car-free bus corridors on the main radial routes into the city centre double up as cycle lanes.

Many improvements in facilities for cyclists in Edinburgh can be attributed to Spokes, the Lothian Cycle Campaign, formed in 1977.

==== Thefts ====
Cycle thefts are common in the city, with an average of five bicycles being stolen every day. Ian Maxwell, a member of Spokes Lothian Cycle Campaign, said: "We've seen a massive increase in cycling in Edinburgh over the last ten years and, unfortunately, with that trend comes an inevitable rise in thefts. Overall, though, with tens of thousands of cyclists, the numbers are still relatively low. The figures underline the problem of lack of secure parking facilities for bikes. They can be difficult to find. Cyclists need to take the appropriate precautions. These are opportunist thieves who move quickly and disappear on their newly acquired getaway vehicle."

==== Safety ====
Lothian's roads are the most dangerous in Scotland for cyclists, with 165 cyclists a year being hospitalised. Problems are reported for cyclists riding in bus lanes in central Edinburgh, such as Princes Street and Lothian Road. A number of cyclists have been killed in Edinburgh in recent years; in September 2004, a 28-year-old man was killed at the junction of Marchmont Road and Melville Drive. In April 2008, an award-winning neuroscientist who worked at the University of Edinburgh, Dr Iain Wilson, was killed in a collision with a truck on the junction between West Richmond Street and Nicolson Street.

==== Disputes ====
Pedicabs are a common form of transport for weekend revellers, with the number operating in Edinburgh growing from only 2 in 2000 to 60 by 2008. This has led to a growing number of complaints from taxi cab drivers, who resent the competition. In one dispute, a pedicab cyclist was reported to have been attacked by a group of three taxi drivers, who kicked and headbutted him. In other cases, taxi drivers have thrown cigarette butts at pedicab cyclists, and in one case, threatened a cyclist with a Taser stun gun (possession of such a device is illegal in Scotland).

Cycling in certain public parks, like walkways across the Meadows, has been legal since the passage of the Land Reform Act in 2003, although signage was not corrected until 2011 in some cases. Portobello promenade has likewise been officially acknowledged as a legal cycle route. Concerns have been expressed that cyclists may run pedestrians over. Peng Lee Yap, chairman of Friends of the Meadows, said "While this is clearly a difficult issue, it was felt that the positive way forward is the approach of Spokes to improve cyclists' behaviour." In late 2007 Spokes Lothian group launched their "Bike Polite" campaign to encourage cyclists to be more considerate.

==== Self-service bicycle hire ====
Between 2018 and 2021, Edinburgh operated a self-service bicycle hire scheme. Branded "Just Eat cycles" and operated by Serco, the scheme cost the city £1.8 million. It was terminated in September 2021 because of vandalism and theft.

In September 2025, a new e-bike hire scheme was launched, with a two-year trial period. It is run by Voi Technology. Unlike the Serco scheme, the new one uses a "dockless" model, where bikes can be picked up and dropped off at designated areas on pavements and roads rather than at docking stations. It originally deployed 50 e-bikes, but this was increased to 480 in December. As of June 2026, there are 800 bikes in 200 locations around the city. The scheme claims to be "the most successful in Europe, in terms of the trips per vehicle per day". It is financed entirely from charges paid by users, with no cost to tax-payers.

=== Waterways ===
The Union Canal was opened in 1822 and provides an inland waterway link from Edinburgh to Falkirk and from there to Glasgow via the Forth and Clyde Canal. It is currently owned by the public corporation Scottish Canals and chiefly used for leisure purposes.

=== Pedestrians ===
Given that Edinburgh is a small, relatively walkable city, travelling by foot is a common means of transport for the majority of citizens who live, work or visit the city. Like most urban zones, pedestrian density is at its highest in the commercial core of the city, where the majority of shops, businesses and offices are located, with pedestrian density tailing off rapidly through the inner city to the suburbs. In Edinburgh, pedestrian density is at its highest around Princes Street, George Street, Rose Street, the Royal Mile, the North and South Bridges as well as George IV Bridge. These are the areas where the majority of city centre shops are located, as well as bars, restaurants, pubs and tourist attractions such as the Scott Monument, Edinburgh Castle and the Holyrood Palace.

Unlike Glasgow, most of the city centre is not pedestrianised, with the exception of Rose Street (parallel to Princes Street), which is pedestrianised along its length. A section of the Royal Mile - one of the main tourist streets in Edinburgh - from the junction of George IV Bridge (Melbourne Place) to the junction with North Bridge, is pedestrianised through the use of automatic bollards which only give access to authorised vehicles. This is an area with pavement cafes and bars with tables outside.

== Proposed plans ==
Following elections to the Scottish Parliament in May 2007, the Scottish National Party formed a new minority government. As of June 2007, both the tram project and rail link to Edinburgh Airport (described below) were scrutinised by the Scottish Executive with a view to possible cancellation, largely on grounds of cost. The Auditor General for Scotland was asked to consider the issue of value for money and gave a favourable response for the tram project.

=== Edinburgh Airport Rail Link (EARL) ===
There is currently no direct rail link to Edinburgh Airport. Until 2016, the nearest railway stations were Edinburgh Park and South Gyle, some distance from the airport.

The former Labour and Liberal Democrat coalition administration in Scotland (1999–2007) proposed a rail link, with plans for completion by 2010. Such a link was viewed as necessary because of the growth of road traffic in the immediate vicinity of the airport, meaning the existing road network in the area is operating at maximum capacity or nearing capacity. Furthermore, in comparison to other BAA plc airports in the UK a relatively low proportion of Edinburgh Airport passengers use public transport (19%) with most journeys being by private car (49%). The rail link would have been connected to the main Edinburgh – Glasgow line by a new railway line via Winchburgh and Edinburgh Park station. A second link would have joined the Fife lines to this route prior to reaching the airport station. The rail link would also pass under the runway and split westward near Kirkliston towards Glasgow and Stirling and eastward to Fife and the North, and would require the construction of a new subsurface railway station in front of the terminal building. A parliamentary bill was submitted to the Scottish Parliament which needed to be considered and approved before construction could take place. The Bill received Royal Assent on 19 April 2007. Initial estimates suggested that the scheme would have cost around £500m.

Following the Scottish Parliament election of 2007, the new SNP minority administration planned to scrap EARL as a manifesto commitment. Following a vote in the Scottish Parliament on 27 June 2007, the EARL project was cancelled. However, as part of the Edinburgh to Glasgow Improvement Programme, Edinburgh Gateway station in Gogar was opened in 2016 on the Fife line as an inter-change station with Edinburgh Trams.

=== Forth hovercraft ===
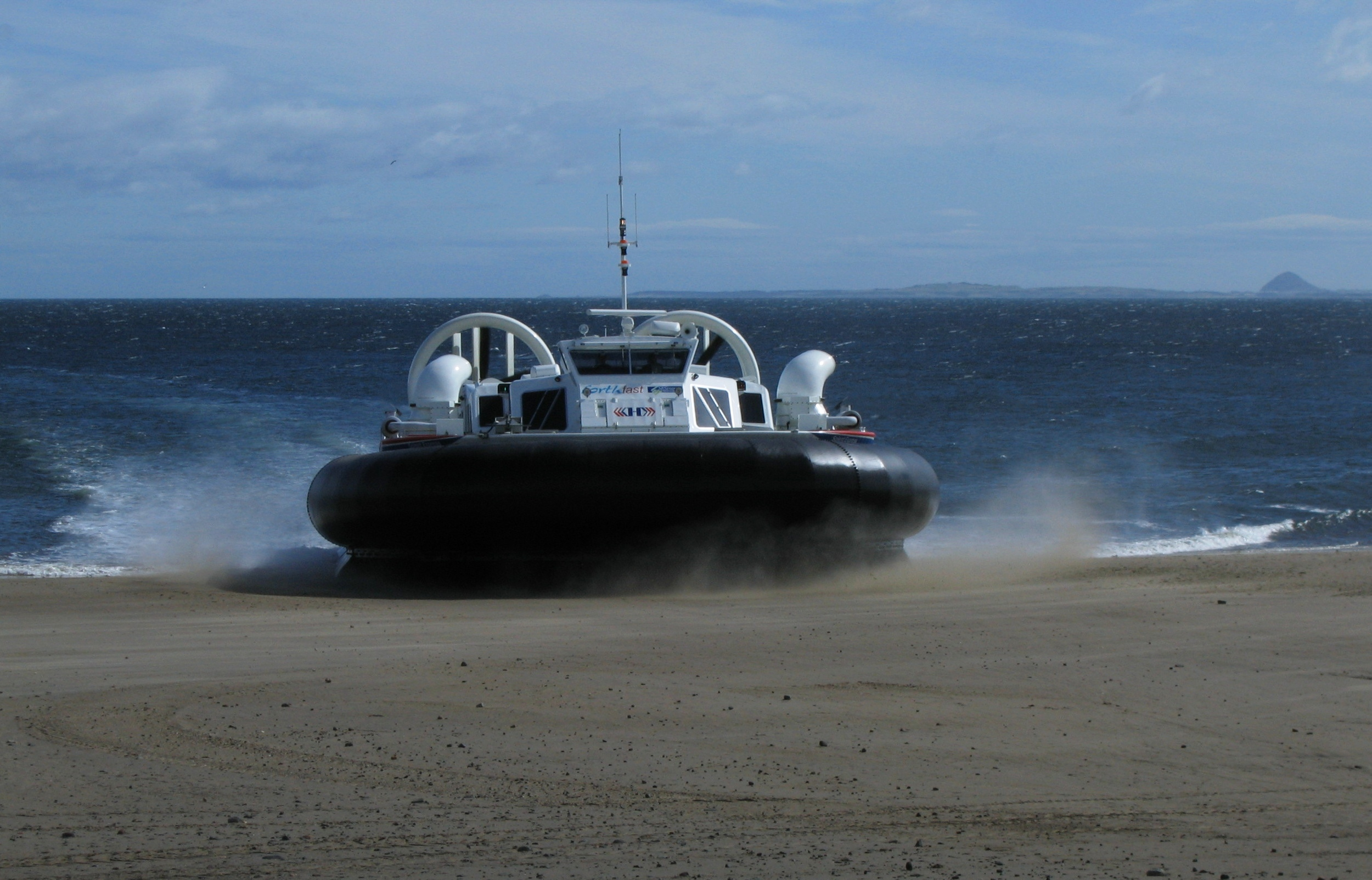
The experimental Forth hovercraft in 2007

Proposals were put forward by Fife Council in 2004 for a passenger ferry service to operate between Kirkcaldy and Leith. The plans envisaged a half-hourly service across the Firth of Forth, operational by 2008, with two vessels capable of carrying up to 150 passengers.

An experimental hovercraft service ran in summer 2007 between Kirkcaldy and Seafield, operated by Stagecoach Group. Journey times were 18 minutes and the service was used by around 32,000 passengers.

Cross-Forth proposals were revived in 2009 when Edinburgh Council began to examine the possibility of beginning either a ferry service between Burntisland and Granton, or the revival of the hovercraft service. In January 2010, Stagecoach set up a joint venture with hovercraft makers the Bland Group to run a hovercraft service, and secured funding of around £14 million. Subject to funding Edinburgh and Fife councils, the companies hoped to construct a dedicated hovercraft terminal near the promenade at Portobello and begin passenger operation by 2012. They estimated 870,000 people would use the hovercraft service each year, and sailings would connect with local bus services into Edinburgh and around Fife. In 2017, the City of Edinburgh Council refused planning permission to construct a hovercraft terminal at Portobello.

=== High-speed rail ===
Community and business leaders in Edinburgh have voiced support for the construction of a high-speed rail link between Glasgow and Edinburgh to reduce current journey times between Scotland's two main cities. Currently ScotRail operate a shuttle service, with two to four trains per hour from 06:00 to 23:45, between the two cities on the Glasgow to Edinburgh (via Falkirk High) line, with journeys taking around 50 minutes. It is estimated that a high-speed maglev system would halve the journey time between the two cities. The UK Government has also conducted a feasibility study into ascertaining whether a high-speed Maglev network between Edinburgh and London would be economically beneficial and thus cutting down on the growth of domestic air traffic between the two cities. Such a system would, however require a complete new infrastructure as it is not compatible with the existing rail infrastructure.

== History ==
Edinburgh formerly had an extensive municipally owned tram system. Edinburgh Corporation Tramways were cabled-hauled until the early 1920s, then converted to electric traction. The last tram on Edinburgh's original system operated in 1956.

== See also ==
- Economy of Edinburgh
- Transport in Scotland
