= The Gyle Shopping Centre =

Shopping centre in Edinburgh, Scotland

Coordinates: 55°56′20″N 3°18′50″W

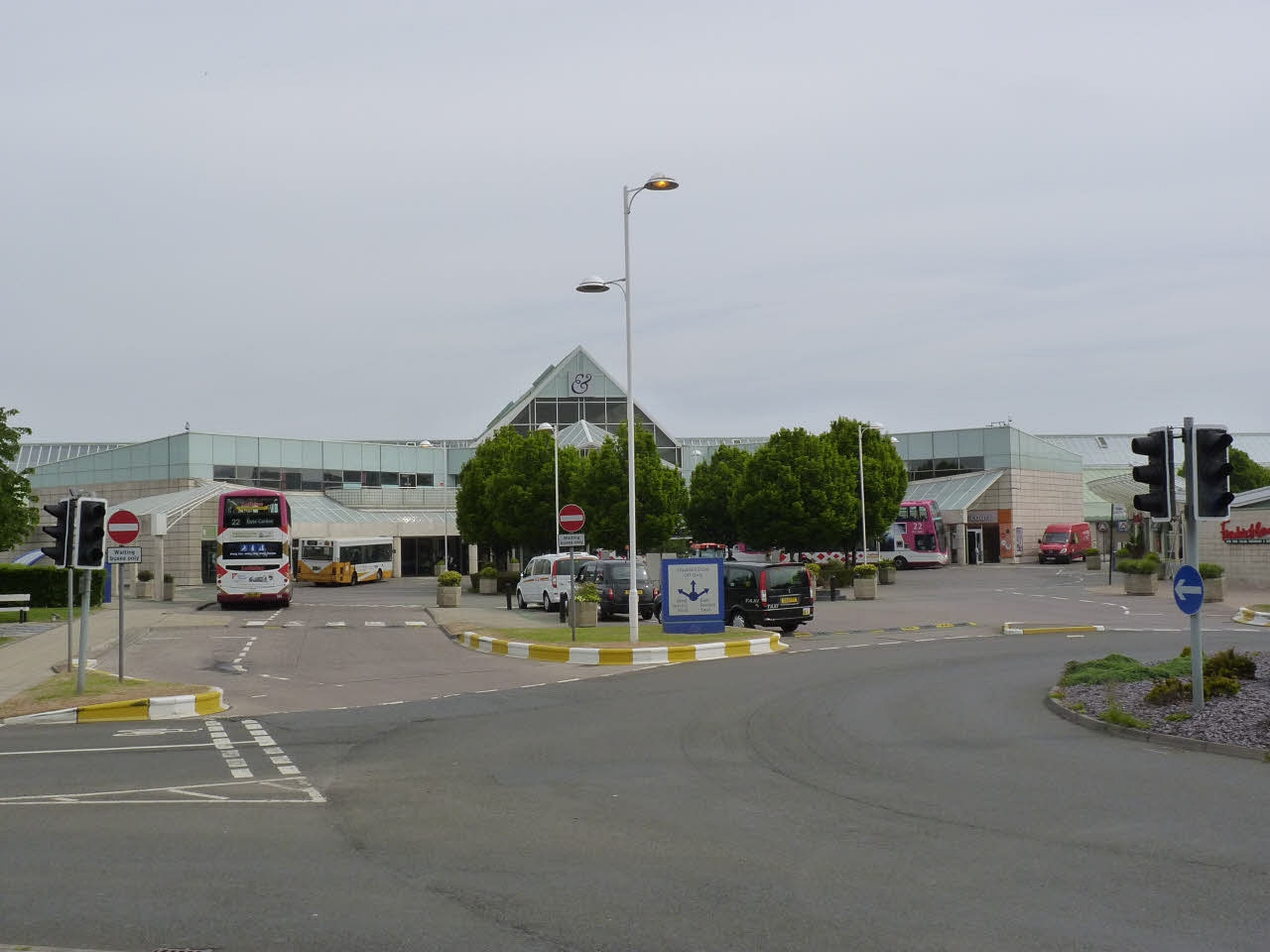
- Location: Edinburgh, Scotland, UK
- Address: Gyle Avenue; Edinburgh; EH12 9JY
- Opened: 1993; 1994 (food court)
- Owner: NewRiver
- Num. of anchor tenants: 2
- Floor area: 9,290 m^{2} (100,000 sq ft)
- Public transit: Edinburgh Gateway; Gyle Centre
- Website: www.gyleshopping.com

The Gyle Shopping Centre is a shopping centre located in the South Gyle area of Edinburgh, Scotland. The main centre has two anchor tenants, Marks & Spencer and Morrisons (formerly Safeway), at opposite ends of the shopping centre.

== Construction ==
A new district shopping centre for West Edinburgh was proposed by a public inquiry in 1987. The findings of the West Edinburgh Inquiry of 1989 were approved by the then-Secretary of State for Scotland, Malcolm Rifkind. The floor space in the shopping centre, which was originally called Maybury Park, was later scaled down to 9,290 m^{2} (100,000 sq ft) to protect nearby retail areas, such as Wester Hailes and Corstorphine.

The management contractor, Wimpey Construction, began work on The Gyle in April 1992, and it opened in October 1993. A food court was later added in the beginning of 1994, by the Catering Development.

== Expansion ==
The food court was added shortly after opening. Marks & Spencer have since extended more retailer space of their own, and took the opportunity to change their floor layout - adding a larger food hall - during the COVID-19 pandemic in 2021.

The centre applied for planning permission to expand the food hall and add a cinema in 2019. The plans would have moved the bus stance away from the front of the centre, and were ultimately rejected by the City of Edinburgh Council's planning committee due to potential issues with public transport and cycling that the changes could cause.

Ownership of the centre then changed and the new owners started looking at grand plans to change the nature of the shopping centre to closer resemble a local town centre rather than an out-of-town shopping centre.

== Ownership ==
Gyle Shopping Centre opened in October 1993. The centre began as a joint development between Edinburgh Council, Marks and Spencer and Asda, although by the time of opening; Asda was replaced by Safeway. In 1997, the Gyle Shopping Centre was purchased outright by Marks and Spencer. In March 2000 Marks and Spencer sold the centre to the Universities Superannuation Scheme (USS) in March 2000.

The centre was purchased by William Ewart Properties in 2006.

Ownership of the centre changed again in late-2020/early-2021. A failed planning application to expand the food court and add a cinema to the centre has hit the complex hard, along with the effects of the COVID-19 pandemic.

In August 2023, the centre was acquired for £40m by Capital & Regional from Gyle Shopping Centre Trustee Limited. At the time, gross rents were £6.8m/year and net rents were £5.77m/year, with 94% occupancy.In 2024, the centre became part of NewRiver, after its acquisition of Capital & Regional.

== Transport ==
The Gyle is accessible from the Gogar Junction (Junction 11) of the A720 Edinburgh City Bypass road, and is also linked by a pedestrian underpass to Edinburgh Gateway station.

=== Buses ===
Bus stops are located at the main mall entrance and are served by Lothian Buses, Scottish Citylink and HcL Transport.

=== Tram ===
Gyle Centre tram stop is located 150m west of the west mall entrance (Morrisons).

| Preceding station | Edinburgh Trams | Following station |
|---|---|---|
| Edinburgh Park Central towards Newhaven | Newhaven - Edinburgh Airport | Edinburgh Gateway station towards Edinburgh Airport |
