= South Gyle =

District of Edinburgh, Scotland

Coordinates: 55°56′5.35″N 3°17′52.11″W

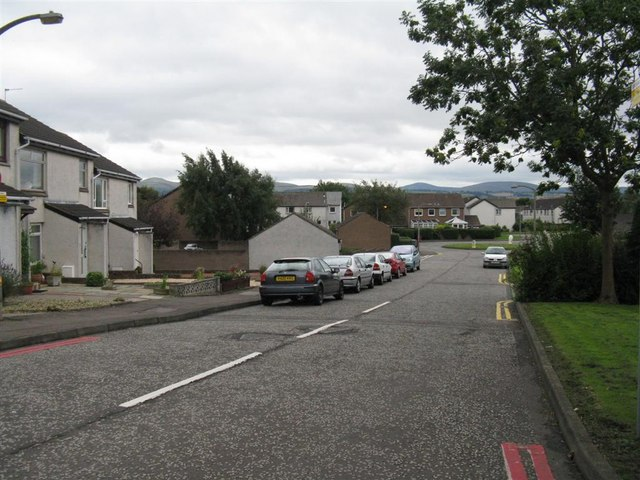
- Housing in Gyle Park

- Location within the City of Edinburgh council area Location within Scotland
- OS grid reference: NT184719
- Council area: City of Edinburgh
- Lieutenancy area: Edinburgh
- Country: Scotland
- Sovereign state: United Kingdom
- Post town: EDINBURGH
- Postcode district: EH12
- Dialling code: 0131
- Police: Scotland
- Fire: Scottish
- Ambulance: Scottish
- UK Parliament: Edinburgh West Edinburgh South West
- Scottish Parliament: Edinburgh Western

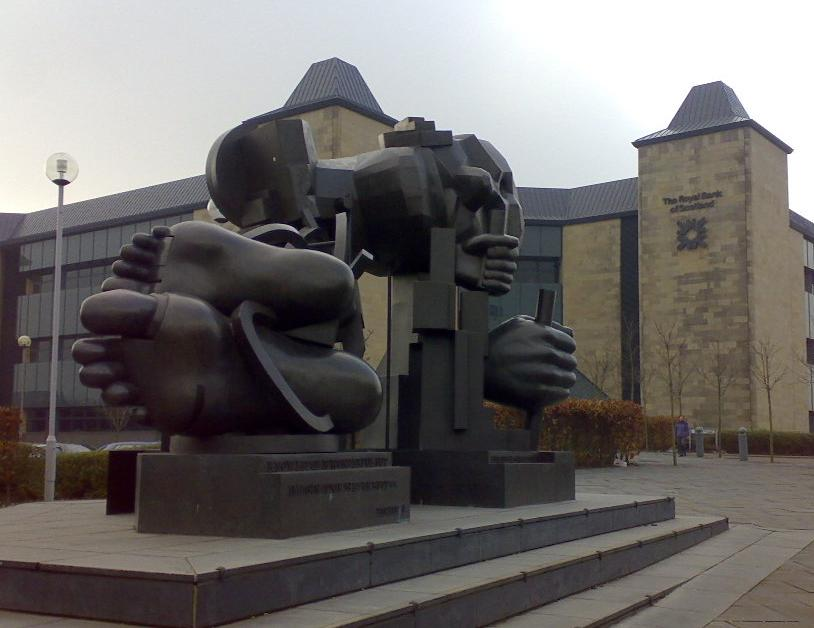
Eduardo Paolozzi's The Wealth of Nations, was located in South Gyle in the sculptor's home town of Edinburgh. The inscription is from Albert Einstein and says, Knowledge is wonderful, but imagination is even better. The sculpture was removed in 2020 when RBS moved out of its office.

South Gyle (pronounced /ɡaɪl/) is an area of Edinburgh, Scotland, lying on the western edge of the city and to the south and west of an area of former marshland once known as the Gogarloch, on the edge of Corstorphine. Most of the buildings in the area are of recent origin, dating from the later 1980s, 1990s, and early 21st century, with the exception of some farm workers' cottages and an early 1970s council estate abutting South Gyle railway station.

South Gyle can be neatly divided into two main zones – a residential one, incorporating Gogarloch and the neighbouring area centred on South Gyle Mains; and a commercial/business one which incorporates the Gyle Shopping Centre, Edinburgh Park, Gyle Park (an actual park, but with some shopping centres near it), and South Gyle Crescent. The Royal Bank of Scotland and sportscotland are all based in this district. The Lochside development also features a number of busts of Scottish poets.

== Etymology ==
"Gyle", which is pronounced with a hard "g", is of uncertain etymology. It has been suggested that it comes from an old Gaelic word "goill" meaning a "bog", which would make sense given the former Gogar Loch in the area.

There is also a North Gyle about one mile (two kilometres) away, which is named after a local farm. This is incorporated in some street names in that area.

== Transport ==
Edinburgh Airport is nearby at Ingliston, and also close is the city bypass (A720), connecting to several major routes into the city.

South Gyle has two railway stations: South Gyle station is on the line between Edinburgh and Fife, and Edinburgh Park station provides services to Edinburgh, Stirling and Dunblane, Bathgate and to Glasgow Queen Street low-level.

Lothian Buses services 2, 12, 18, 21, 22, 22A, 32 and 36 serve the area.

Edinburgh Trams serve the area with stops at Bankhead, Edinburgh Park Station, Edinburgh Park Central (Lochside) and The Gyle Shopping centre.

North of the Gogar Roundabout, the Edinburgh Gateway Interchange opened in December 2016. It connects trains from Fife with the tram to and from the airport. A subway under the busy A8 provides access to the Gyle Shopping Centre.

== Government ==
The Scottish Prison Service has its headquarters in South Gyle.

== Education ==
The area is served by Gylemuir Primary School, on Wester Broom Place. The closest secondary schools are St Augustine's RC High School and Forrester High School.

== Political ward ==
Drum Brae/Gyle is the name of a political ward within the Edinburgh West UK Parliament Constituency and the Edinburgh Western Scottish Parliament constituency.

== Demographics ==
Ethnicity	Drum Brae/Gyle Ward	Edinburgh
White	85.3%	84.9%
Asian	10.1%	8.6%
Black	1.6%	2.1%
Mixed	1.4%	2.5%
Other	1.6%	1.9%

== Notable residents ==
- Andrew & George Combe, 18th Century phrenologists, who lived at Redheughs during childhood.
- William Neill lived here towards the end of the 1960s.
