= Edinburgh Airport Rail Link =

Airport Rail link

Coordinates: 55.948°N 3.353°W

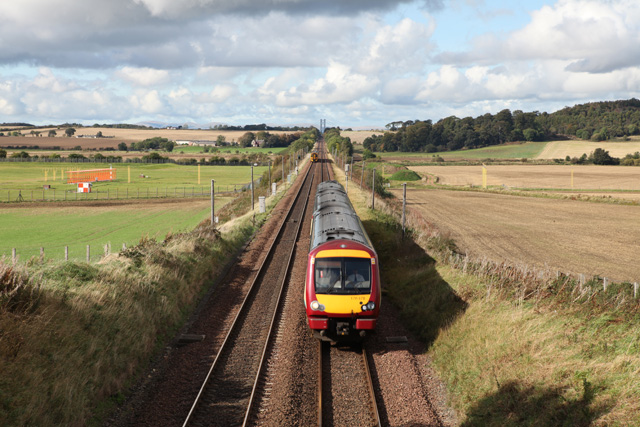
- The Fife Circle Line passing the end of Edinburgh Airport runway

Overview
- Status: Proposal cancelled
- Locale: Edinburgh Airport, Scotland
- Termini: Edinburgh Waverley; Glasgow Queen Street; Fife

Service
- Type: Urban rail / Airport rail link proposal
- System: ScotRail/National Rail

Technical
- Line length: 14 kilometres (8.7 mi)
- Character: Underground spurs linking existing railway lines
- Track gauge: 1,435 mm (4 ft 8 1/2 in) standard gauge

The Edinburgh Airport Rail Link (EARL) was a proposed rail link to Edinburgh Airport, Scotland. The project was passed by the Scottish Parliament in 2007, but following a change of government, was cancelled in September 2007 on the grounds of cost.

The link was planned to open in 2011 and would have included an underground airport station located beneath the terminal building. A tunnel was to have been constructed to take trains underneath the main runway. The Edinburgh Airport Rail Link would have allowed direct rail travel to and from the airport from Scotland's main towns and cities. New rolling stock was to be ordered for the service to compensate for any extra journey time created by the additional stop.

== Background ==
Edinburgh Airport has no long-distance railway station and is served by Edinburgh Trams, but it is close to two major railway lines, the Fife Circle and the Edinburgh-Glasgow railway lines. The EARL project aimed to construct connecting links from these lines, intersecting at a new underground railway station underneath Edinburgh Airport, in order to provide direct rail links to the airport from Edinburgh, Glasgow and other Scottish cities.

The project was proposed by the Labour and Liberal Democrat coalition of the Scottish Government and it was supported by the Scottish Conservatives. The Scottish National Party (SNP) and the Scottish Green Party both opposed the project on grounds of cost and because it duplicated existing bus services.

Edinburgh Airport Rail Link Act 2007
- Act of the Scottish Parliament
- Scottish Parliament
- Long title: An Act of the Scottish Parliament to authorise the construction of new railways to link Edinburgh Airport to the national rail network; to make provision concerning planning agreements and developer contributions relating to the railway; and for connected purposes.
- Citation: 2007 asp 16

Dates
- Royal assent: 19 April 2007

Status: Amended

Text of statute as originally enacted

Text of the Edinburgh Airport Rail Link Act 2007 as in force today (including any amendments) within the United Kingdom, from legislation.gov.uk.

The Edinburgh Airport Rail Link Bill was passed in March 2007 by a vote in the Scottish Parliament of 86 votes to 29. The Edinburgh Airport Rail Link Act 2007 (asp 16) received royal assent on 19 April 2007.

== Proposed services ==
Though the exact timetable had not been finalised, the following service pattern was expected to have been implemented:

- Edinburgh-Glasgow - 2 trains per hour
- Edinburgh-Dunblane - 2 trains per hour
- Fife Circle - 2 trains per hour
- Edinburgh-Aberdeen - 1 train per hour
- Edinburgh-Perth & Inverness - 1 train per hour

== Cancellation ==
Following the Scottish Parliament election, 2007, the newly elected SNP minority government announced their intention to cancel the Edinburgh Airport Rail Link project in September 2007 amid concerns over the need for public spending cuts. Transport commentators criticised the cancellation of the EARL project, claiming that approximately £30 million had been spent on the scheme.

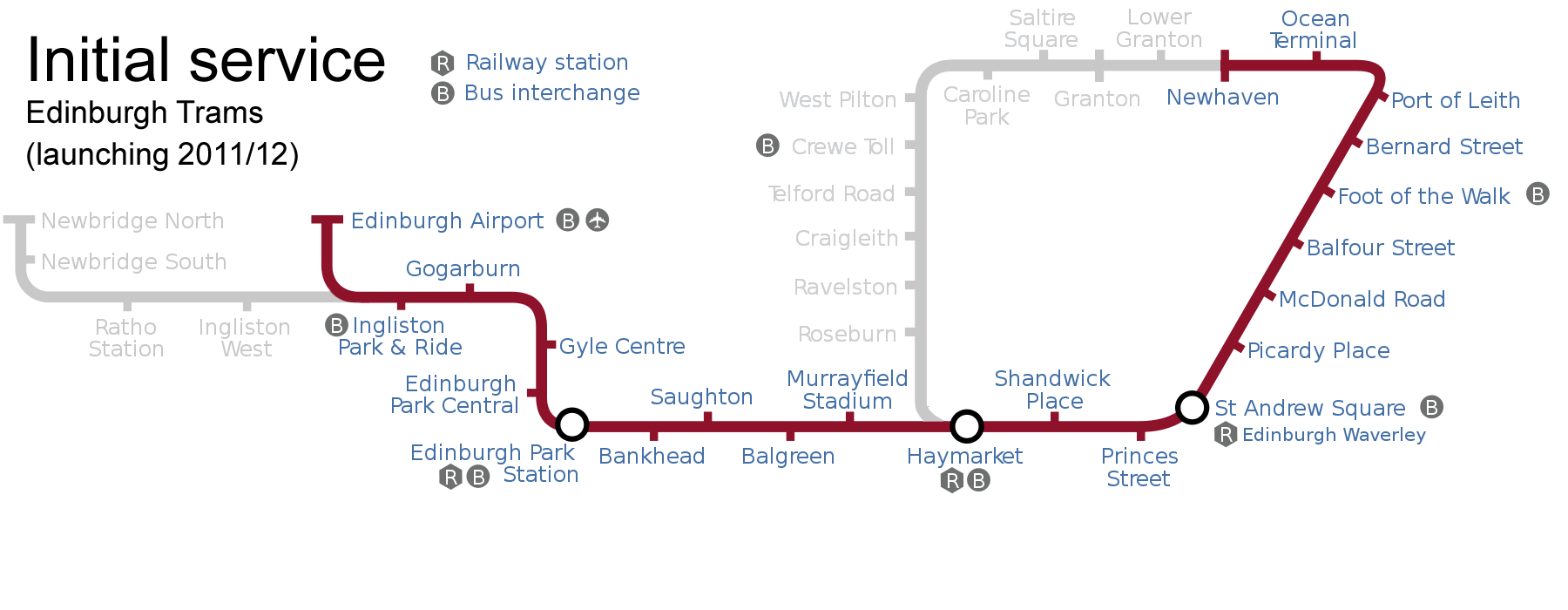
Diagram of the Edinburgh Trams service

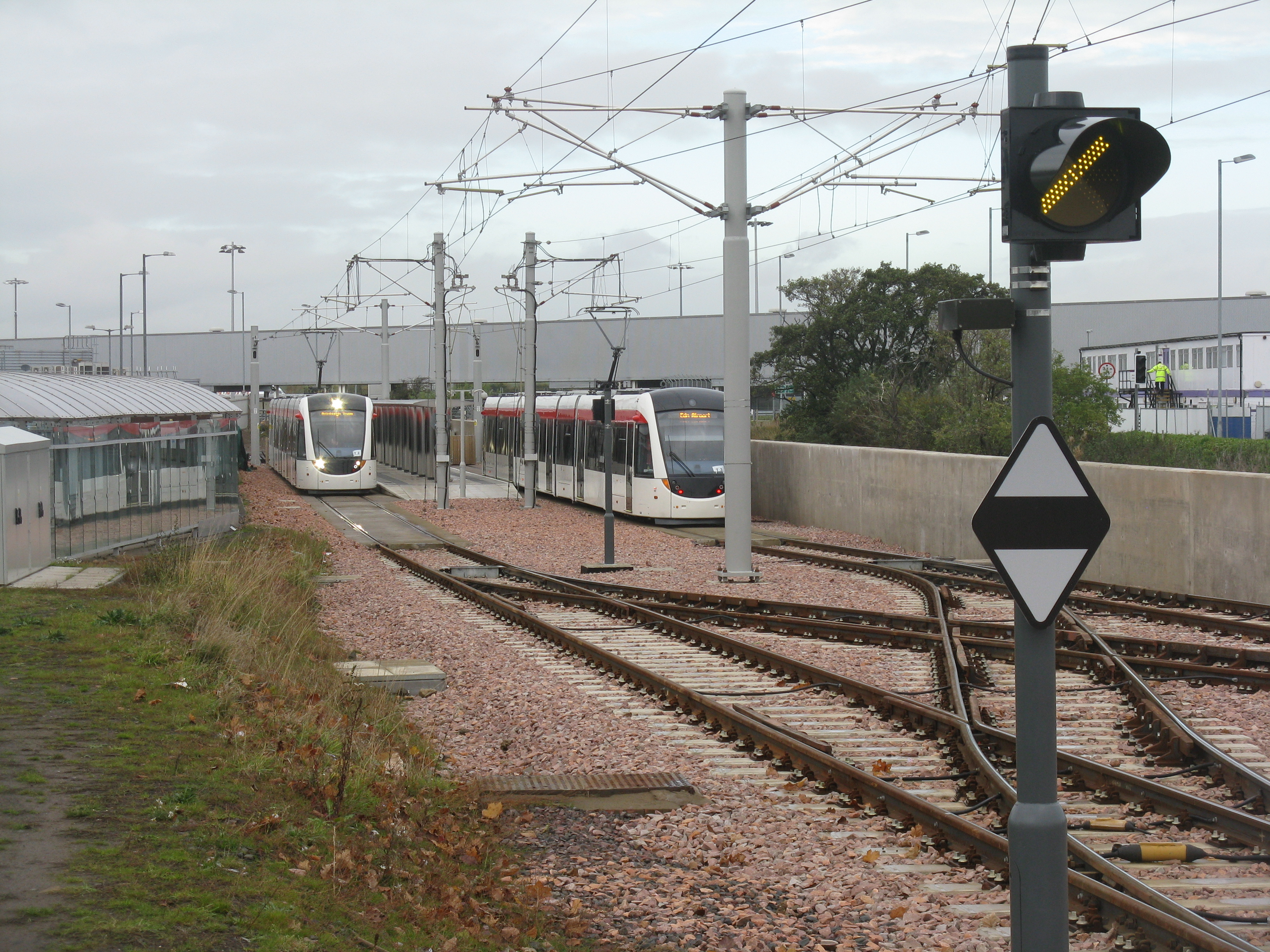
Edinburgh Trams Airport stop, opened in 2014

Following a vote in the Scottish Parliament on 27 June 2007, the Scottish Government agreed to retain the Edinburgh Trams project to construct a light rail line between the airport and Edinburgh city centre. John Swinney MSP, the Cabinet Secretary for Finance in the Scottish Government, warned that the full underground EARL project would probably be scrapped in favour of the electrification of the Glasgow-Edinburgh Main Line. The Edinburgh Trams service was launched, on 31 May 2014, as a single light rail route from central Edinburgh to the airport.

To address the loss of direct mainline rail links from around Scotland to Edinburgh Airport, the Scottish Government instead proposed a cheaper alternative in the form of a new interchange station at Gogar offering interchange between the Fife Circle Line and the Edinburgh to Aberdeen Line and Edinburgh Trams. Construction of the new station, called Edinburgh Gateway started in April 2015 and it was opened in December 2016.

== See also ==
- Transport in Edinburgh
- Edinburgh Trams
- Edinburgh Airport
- Glasgow Airport Rail Link
