= Edinburgh Park =

Business park in Edinburgh, Scotland

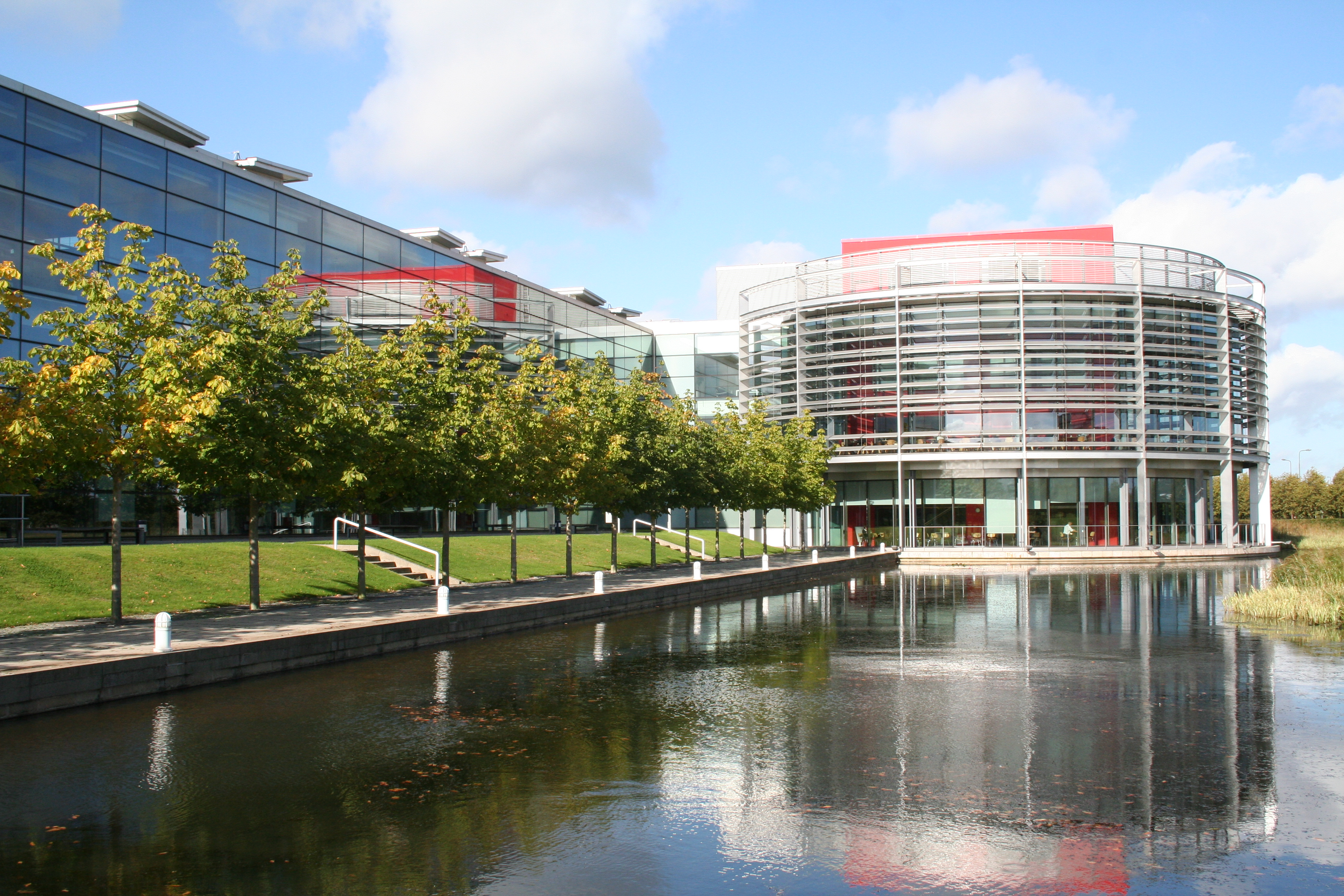
BT building, designed by Bennetts Associates architects

Edinburgh Park is an out-of-town business park in South Gyle, Edinburgh, Scotland. It is west of the city, near Edinburgh Airport and adjacent to the Edinburgh City Bypass. It was opened in 1995. The layout of the park, centered around an artificial loch, was masterplanned by American architect Richard Meier. The development has a bar/grill, nursery, and several sculptures, including busts of famous Scottish poets and a 7 metre tall Paolozzi Vulcan, relocated from Central Square, Newcastle.

Edinburgh Park railway station, which is on the Glasgow to Edinburgh via Falkirk Line, opened in December 2003. Edinburgh Gateway station on the Fife Circle Line is also nearby (15 mins walk). Edinburgh Trams began serving the park on 31 May 2014 with stops at Edinburgh Park Station, Edinburgh Park Central and The Gyle.

In 2022, the owners announce plans to greatly expand the number of sculptures and develop the park as a cultural hub as well as a business district, starting with a movie themed bar and performance venue. A new 8,500 capacity indoor arena on a site within Edinburgh Park is under construction, with completion by 2028.

== Businesses ==
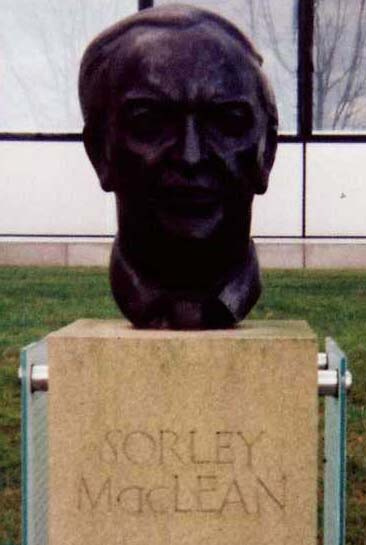
Herm of Sorley MacLean, the Gaelic poet, in the Lochside development

Businesses with a presence in the Edinburgh Park include:

- Aegon UK
- Lloyds Banking Group
- BT
- Diageo
- HSBC
- John Menzies
- JP Morgan
- Fujitsu
- RBS
- Regus
- Sainsbury's Bank
- NetCracker Technology EMEA Ltd
- WSP Group

== Recent developments ==
In October 2019 construction commenced on the next phase of the Edinburgh Park development by Parabola.

The first phase of the Dixon Jones 48 acre mixed use masterplan for Parabola at Edinburgh Park was approved by Edinburgh Council in September 2018. The detailed application included seven office buildings amounting to over one million square feet of grade A commercial space, leisure and sports facilities, a new public square, shops, bars, restaurants, a health centre, two multi-story car parks, an energy centre, and high quality public realm and landscaping. It will be the city's largest development for more than a decade and includes the first new crossing built across the tram line since the network was opened in 2014. The scheme was described by the Planning Chairman as a welcome development to Edinburgh and Edinburgh Park.

The development is significantly denser than the original vision of Richard Meier, with buildings planned closer together. The already congested Gyle and Gogar roundabouts will be negatively affected at rush hour due to the increased traffic, should residents not choose public transport.

== Transport ==
Road

- Edinburgh City Bypass (A720)

Rail

Edinburgh Park station on the Edinburgh-Glasgow railway line serves the development.

Tram

Edinburgh Park is served by three stops on the Edinburgh Trams line between Edinburgh Airport and Newhaven; Edinburgh Park Station, Edinburgh Park Central, and Gyle Centre. Trams operate at all stops every 7-10 minutes.

Buses

The business park is served by Lothian Buses routes 2, 12, 18, 21, 22, 32, and 36, Lothian Country routes 70 and 71, McGill's Bus Services, and Stagecoach East Scotland.
