= Bankhead, Edinburgh =

Area of Edinburgh, Scotland

Coordinates: 55°55′31″N 3°17′52″W

Bankhead: Scottish Gaelic: Ceann na Bruaiche; Scots: Bankheid
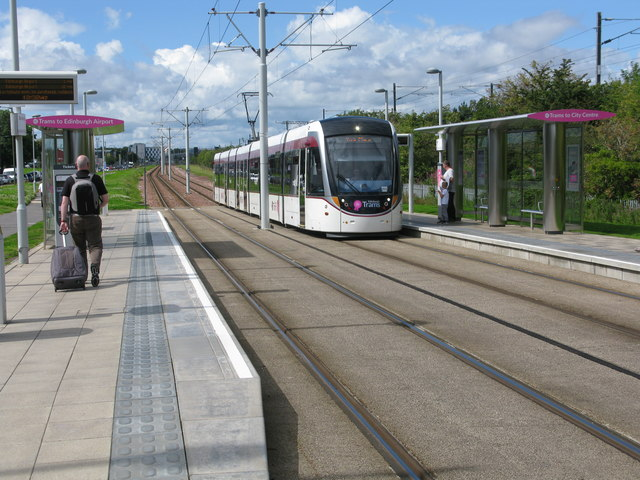

- Location within the City of Edinburgh council area Location within Scotland
- Council area: City of Edinburgh
- Country: Scotland
- Sovereign state: United Kingdom
- Postcode district: EH
- Dialling code: 0131
- Police: Scotland
- Fire: Scottish
- Ambulance: Scottish

Bankhead is a non-residential area of western Edinburgh, Scotland. It borders the Edinburgh City Bypass (A720) and Hermiston Gait (M8 motorway terminus) to the west, the Calders neighbourhood to the south – accessed via a pedestrian underpass, Sighthill to the east, and South Gyle/Edinburgh Park to the north. It is mostly occupied by a large industrial park. Amongst the companies here, Royal Mail and Burtons Biscuits have a large presence. Ethicon also had a plant here, but it has closed, and will reportedly be replaced by a sports facilities. Edinburgh College, the former Stevenson College and the Sighthill campus of Napier University are just to the west.

== Transport ==
=== Road ===
==== City Bypass ====
Junction 9: Calder
The dual-carriage Calder Road (A71) continues over the bypass here by means of a roundabout

Junction 10: Hermiston Gait
The M8 terminates here at a roundabout under the bypass with access to Hermiston Gait retail park.

=== Rail ===
The main Edinburgh-Glasgow railway line passes along the northern boundary and is served by Edinburgh Park station.

=== Tram ===
Bankhead tram stop is adjacently south of the railway line, close to the junction of Bankhead Drive and the South Gyle Access Road.

Preceding station	Edinburgh Trams	Following station
Saughton towards Newhaven	Newhaven - Edinburgh Airport	Edinburgh Park Station towards Airport

=== Buses ===
==== Lothian Buses ====
- 3, 25, 33, 34, 35, X27, X28 (Calder Road)
- 32, 36, 400 (Bankhead Avenue)
- 2 (Bankhead Drive)
- 21 (Broomhouse Road)
