= South Gyle railway station =

Railway station in Edinburgh, Scotland

South Gyle Scottish Gaelic: Gyle a Deas
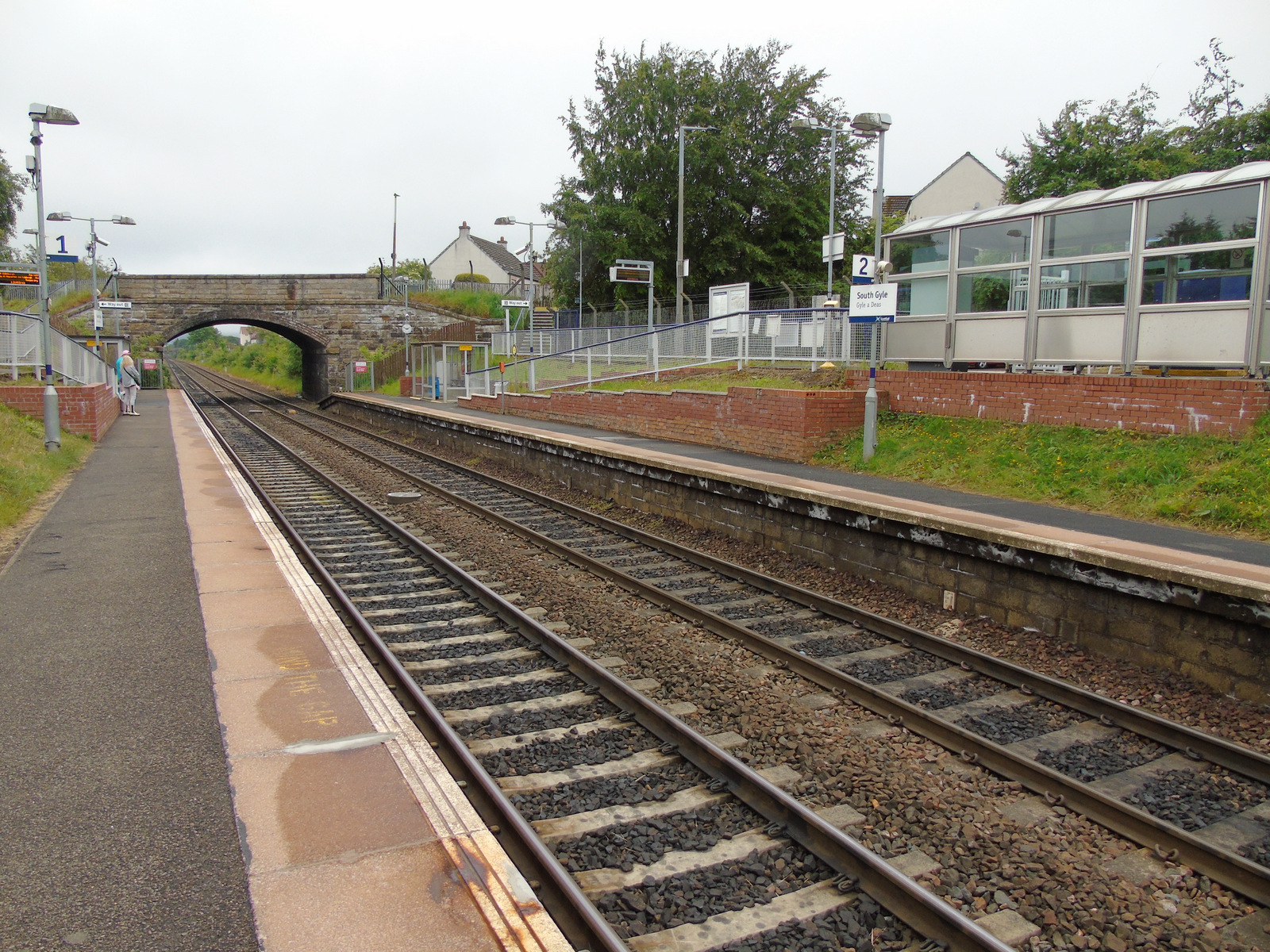

General information
- Location: South Gyle, Edinburgh; Scotland
- Coordinates: 55.9366°N 3.2998°W
- Grid reference: NT189722
- Managed by: ScotRail
- Platforms: 2

Other information
- Station code: SGL

History
- Opened: 9 May 1985; 41 years ago

Passengers
- 2020/21: ▼49,842
- 2021/22: ▲0.121 million
- 2022/23: ▲0.163 million
- 2023/24: ▲0.206 million
- 2024/25: ▲0.221 million
Location
Notes
- Passenger statistics from the Office of Rail and Road

South Gyle railway station is a railway station serving South Gyle in the City of Edinburgh, Scotland. The station was opened on 9 May 1985 by ScotRail alongside new housing in the area, and is located on the Fife Circle Line, 4 1/2 miles (7.2 km) west of Edinburgh Waverley. It has two platforms. There is a ticket machine and a shelter on each platform. The railway line was electrified in 2026.

Edinburgh Park station is also on the edge of South Gyle, which serves the North Clyde Line and the Edinburgh-Dunblane Line. Edinburgh Gateway station is to the north-west of South Gyle.

== Services ==
Monday to Saturday daytimes, two trains per hour go to Edinburgh Waverley eastbound and two trains per hour head towards Inverkeithing and the Fife Circle Line. A few peak hour services extend beyond Waverley to/from Tweedbank.

Evenings and Sundays, two trains per hour go to Edinburgh Waverley and two along the Fife Circle; evening trains via Dunfermline terminate at Glenrothes with Thornton, whilst coast line trains terminate/start at Kirkcaldy. Sundays see one train per hour running both clockwise & anticlockwise around the Circle.

| Preceding station | National Rail | Following station |
|---|---|---|
| Haymarket | ScotRail; Fife Circle Line | Edinburgh Gateway or Dalmeny |
