= Edinburgh Park station =

Railway station in Edinburgh, Scotland

Edinburgh Park Scottish Gaelic: Pàirc Dhùn Èideann
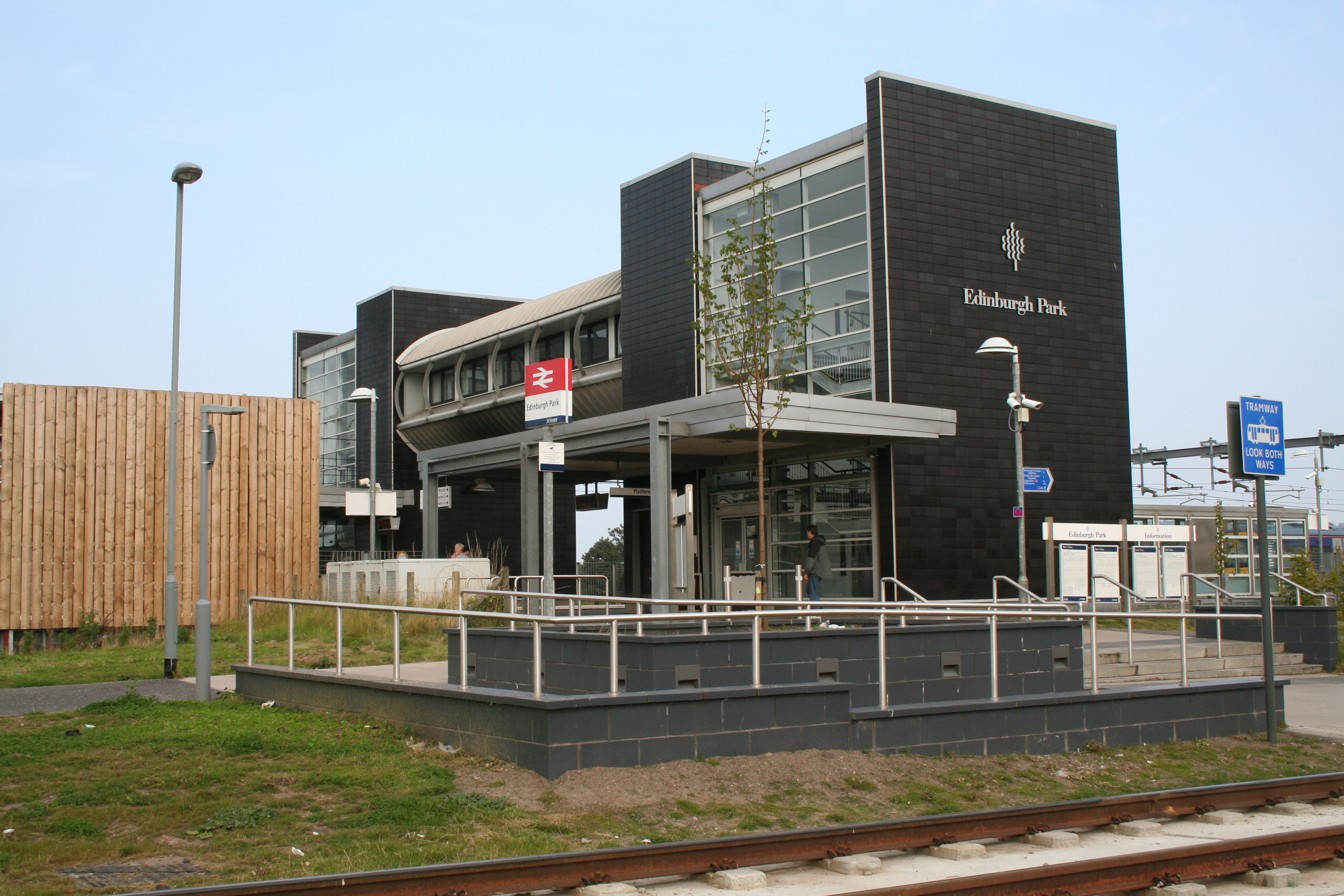
- Entrance to Edinburgh Park railway station

General information
- Location: South Gyle, Edinburgh; Scotland
- Coordinates: 55.9276°N 3.3077°W
- Grid reference: NT184712
- Managed by: ScotRail
- Platforms: 2 National Rail 2 Edinburgh Trams

Other information
- Station code: EDP

Key dates
- 4 December 2003: Opened

Passengers
- 2020/21: ▼0.129 million
- 2021/22: ▲0.290 million
- 2022/23: ▲0.396 million
- 2023/24: ▲0.522 million
- 2024/25: ▲0.559 million
Location
Notes
- Passenger statistics from the Office of Rail and Road

Edinburgh Park railway station is a railway station in the west of Edinburgh, Scotland, serving the Edinburgh Park business park and the Hermiston Gait shopping centre. The new station building was designed by IDP Architects, and it opened on 4 December 2003. It is the first intermediate station between Haymarket and Linlithgow since 1951. Ticket barriers came into use on 25 March 2015.

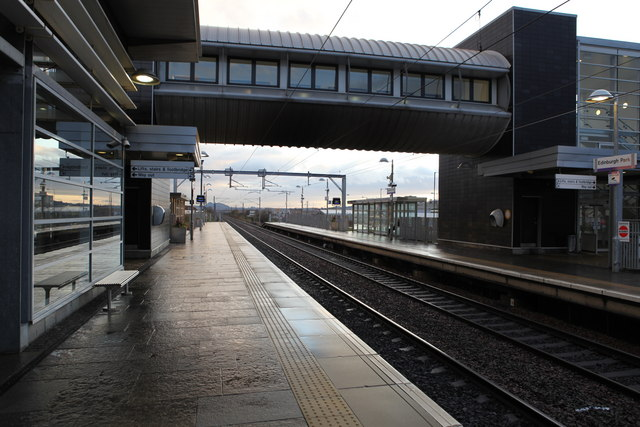
Station platforms

There are two platforms, linked by a covered footbridge, which is accessible by either stairs or a lift. There is also a pedestrian underpass just outside the station, accessible from both platforms. Tickets are available from one of the two ticket machines.

Edinburgh Park station is on the edge of South Gyle, but should not be confused with South Gyle railway station which is 1 mile (1.6 km) away.

The railway through Edinburgh Park station was electrified (using overhead wires at 25 kV AC) in October 2010 as part of the Airdrie-Bathgate Rail Link project.

== Edinburgh Trams ==
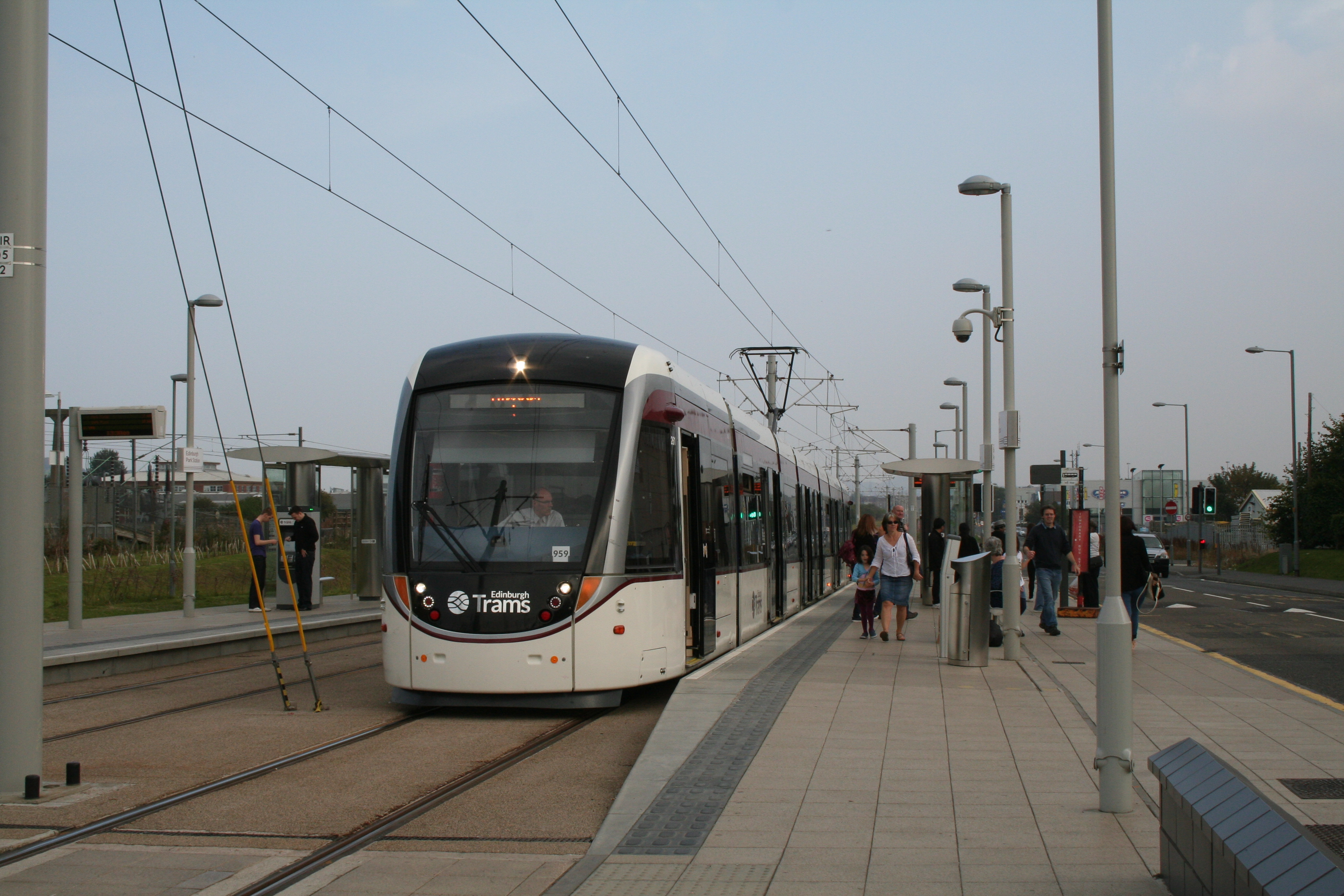
Edinburgh Park station tram stop

The Edinburgh Park tram stop (and the entire tram line) opened on 31 May 2014, the station then becoming a fully staffed rail/tram interchange. The tram stop is adjacent to the southern exit of the railway station.

The first tram (under test and without passengers) called at the stop on 8 October 2013.

Trams run across the city, heading West towards Edinburgh Airport via Gyle Centre, and East towards Newhaven, via the city centre, Leith and Ocean Terminal.

== Services ==
Edinburgh to Dunblane, Glasgow Queen Street, Milngavie and Helensburgh Central services call at the station, providing eight trains an hour to Edinburgh city centre, two to Stirling, two to Glasgow Queen Street High Level via Falkirk Grahamston & Cumbernauld, and four to Glasgow Queen Street Low Level via Bathgate. The Milngavie and Glasgow Queen Street via Falkirk Grahamston do not run in the evenings or on Sundays, while the Dunblane services are hourly on a Sunday.

Trains on the E&GR main line to Queen Street H.L via Falkirk High do not stop here and passengers wishing to travel to stations between Falkirk & Queen St H.L must change at Polmont during evenings and Sundays.

Preceding station	National Rail	Following station
Haymarket	ScotRail; North Clyde Line	Uphall
Haymarket	ScotRail; Edinburgh to Dunblane Line	Linlithgow or Falkirk Grahamston
Haymarket	ScotRail; Glasgow-Edinburgh via Cumbernauld Line	Linlithgow
Preceding station	Edinburgh Trams	Following station
Bankhead towards Newhaven	Newhaven - Edinburgh Airport	Edinburgh Park Central towards Edinburgh Airport
