= Edinburgh Airport =

International airport serving Edinburgh, Scotland

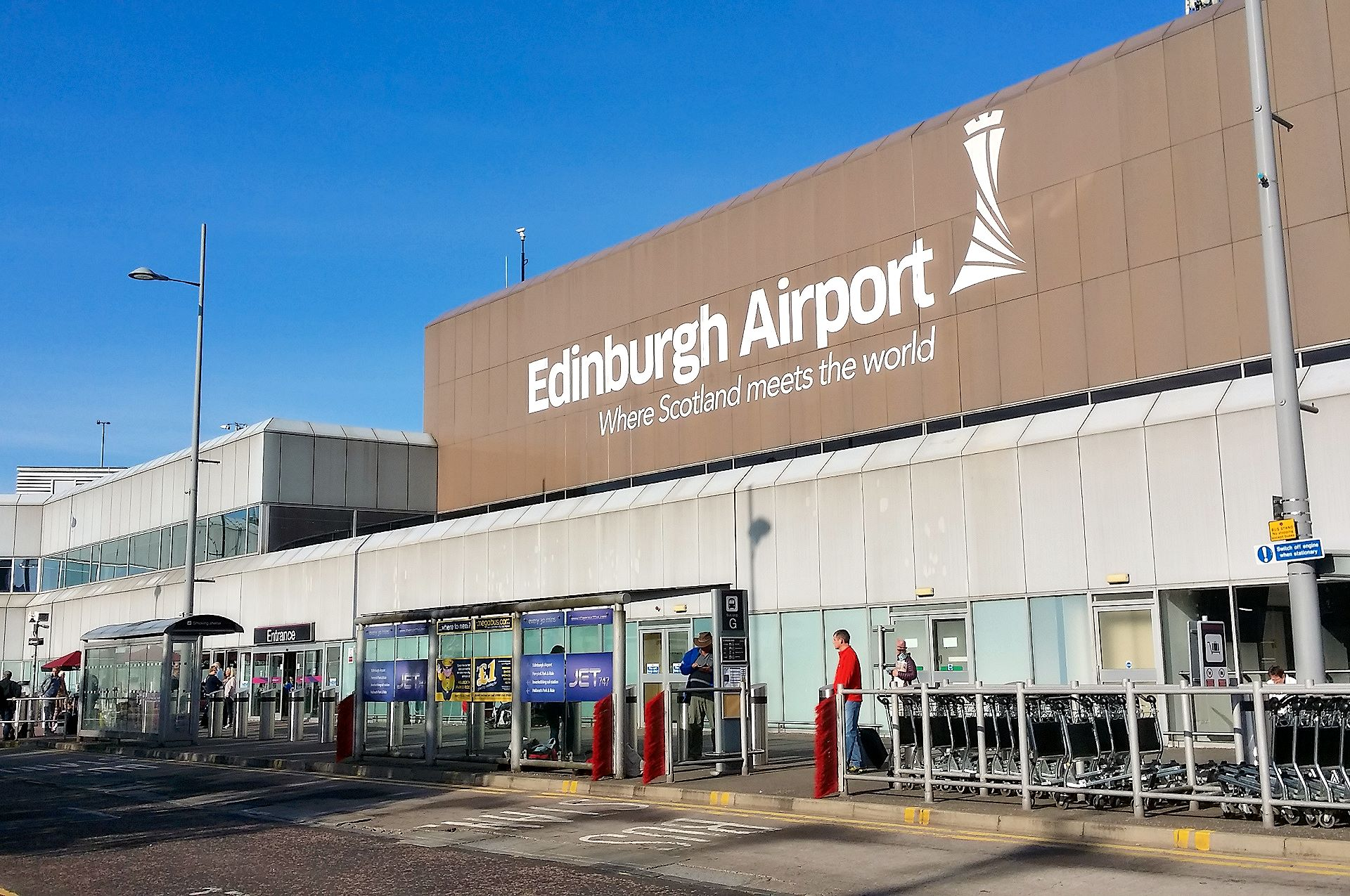
- IATA: EDI; ICAO: EGPH

Summary
- Airport type: Public
- Owner: Vinci SA 50.01% Global Infrastructure Partners 49.99%
- Operator: Edinburgh Airport Limited
- Location: Edinburgh, Scotland
- Opened: 19 May 1947; 79 years ago
- Hub for: Loganair
- Focus city for: easyJet; BA Cityflyer; Jet2.com; Ryanair; Ryanair UK
- Built: 1916; 110 years ago (as RAF Turnhouse)
- Elevation AMSL: 112 ft (34 m)
- Coordinates: 55°57′0″N 3°22′21″W
- Website: www.edinburghairport.com

Map
- Location in Edinburgh EDI/EGPH (Scotland) EDI/EGPH (the United Kingdom)

Runways
Direction	Length		Surface
Direction	m	ft	Surface
06/24	2,558	8,392	Asphalt

Statistics (2025)
- Passengers: 16,970,685
- Passenger change 2024-25: ▲7.5%
- Aircraft movements: 120,927
- Movements change 2024-25: ▲3.6%
- Sources: UK AIP at NATS; Statistics: UK Civil Aviation Authority

Edinburgh Airport (Scottish Gaelic: Port-adhair Dhùn Èideann) (IATA: EDI, ICAO: EGPH) is an international airport located in the Ingliston area of Edinburgh, Scotland. It is located 6 miles (9 km) west of the city centre, just off the M8 and M9 motorways. It is owned and operated by Edinburgh Airport Limited.

The airport is the busiest in Scotland based on passenger numbers, with 15.8 million passengers flying from the airport in 2024, a 10% increase on passenger numbers from 2023. A total of 35 airlines use the airport to fly to over 152 international destinations. As well as being the busiest airport in Scotland, it is the sixth busiest airport in the United Kingdom.

== History ==
=== Early years ===
In 1916, Turnhouse Aerodrome opened as the northernmost British air defence base in World War I used by the Royal Flying Corps.

In 1918, the Royal Air Force was formed and the airfield was named RAF Turnhouse and ownership was transferred to the Air Ministry.

From 1925, the small base was used to house the 603 (City of Edinburgh) Squadron, which consisted of DH 9As, Westland Wapitis, Hawker Harts, and Hawker Hind light bombers. All the aircraft used a grass airstrip.

In 1939, when the Second World War broke out, RAF Fighter Command took control over the airfield and a runway of 3,900 ft (1,189 m) was paved to handle the Supermarine Spitfire. During the Battle of Britain, 3, 65, and 141 Squadrons were present at the airbase.

=== Post-Second World War ===
After 1945, when WW2 ended, the airfield remained under military control. It was officially opened for commercial traffic on 19 May 1947. The first commercial flight to use the airport was a British European Airways service from London (Northolt) to Shetland, with Edinburgh and Aberdeen being intermediate stopping points. The aircraft was an 18-seat Douglas C47.

=== BAA ownership ===
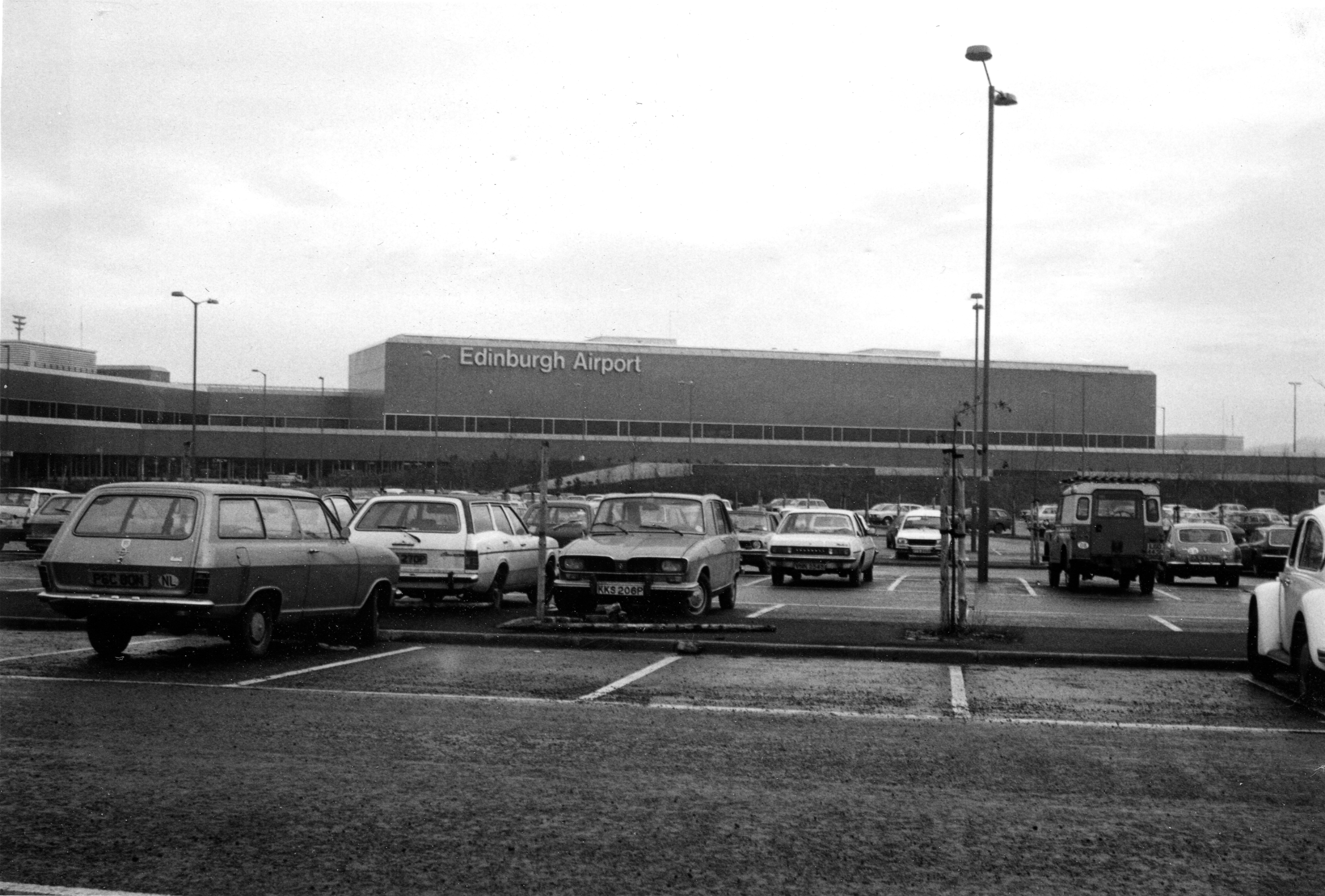
Edinburgh Airport in 1978, under the ownership of BAA.

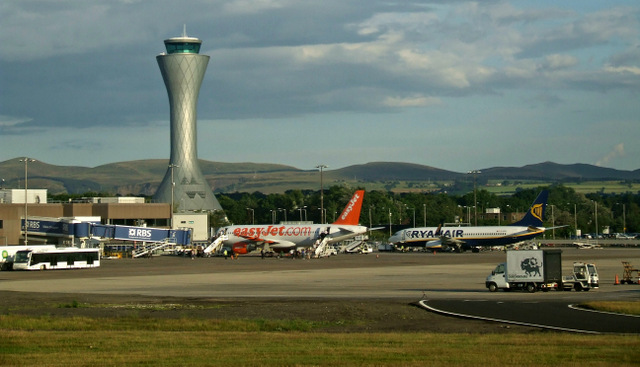
Air traffic control tower and apron (2013).

On 1 April 1971, the British Airports Authority (BAA) took over ownership of the airport, at a time when the original terminal building was running at about eight times its design capacity. Immediate improvements to the terminal were cosmetic, such as extra seating and TV monitors for flight information, and it took two years for plans to be proposed for a completely new terminal and runway redesign. Public consultation on planning started in November 1971 and ended in February 1972. The initial stages of the redevelopment began in June 1973; they included a diversion of the River Almond. Work on the new terminal building, designed by Sir Robert Matthew, started in March 1975, and the building was officially opened by Queen Elizabeth II on 27 May 1977.

International service from Edinburgh began in 1962 with direct service to Dublin, but for many years international flights were charter and private only. This started to change during the late 1970s, with direct services to continental Europe (Amsterdam, 1975). By the mid-1980s, direct routes included Paris, Düsseldorf, Brussels, Frankfurt and Copenhagen, but direct transatlantic flights were not yet possible as Glasgow-Prestwick was the only "designated gateway" in Scotland under the US-UK Bermuda II Agreement. By the time BAA had been privatised in 1987, Edinburgh Airport handled over 1.8 million passengers each year; compared to the 681,000 passengers handled in 1971 when BAA first took control of the airport.

RAF Turnhouse was operational near the passenger terminal of the airport for all of the post-war period but was finally closed in 1997.

On 19 October 2011, BAA Limited announced its intention to sell the airport, following a decision by the UK's Competition Commission requiring BAA to sell either Glasgow Airport or Edinburgh Airport. BAA announced on 23 April 2012 that it had sold Edinburgh Airport to Global Infrastructure Partners (GIP) for a price of £807.2 million, equivalent to £1161 million in 2025.

=== GIP ownership ===
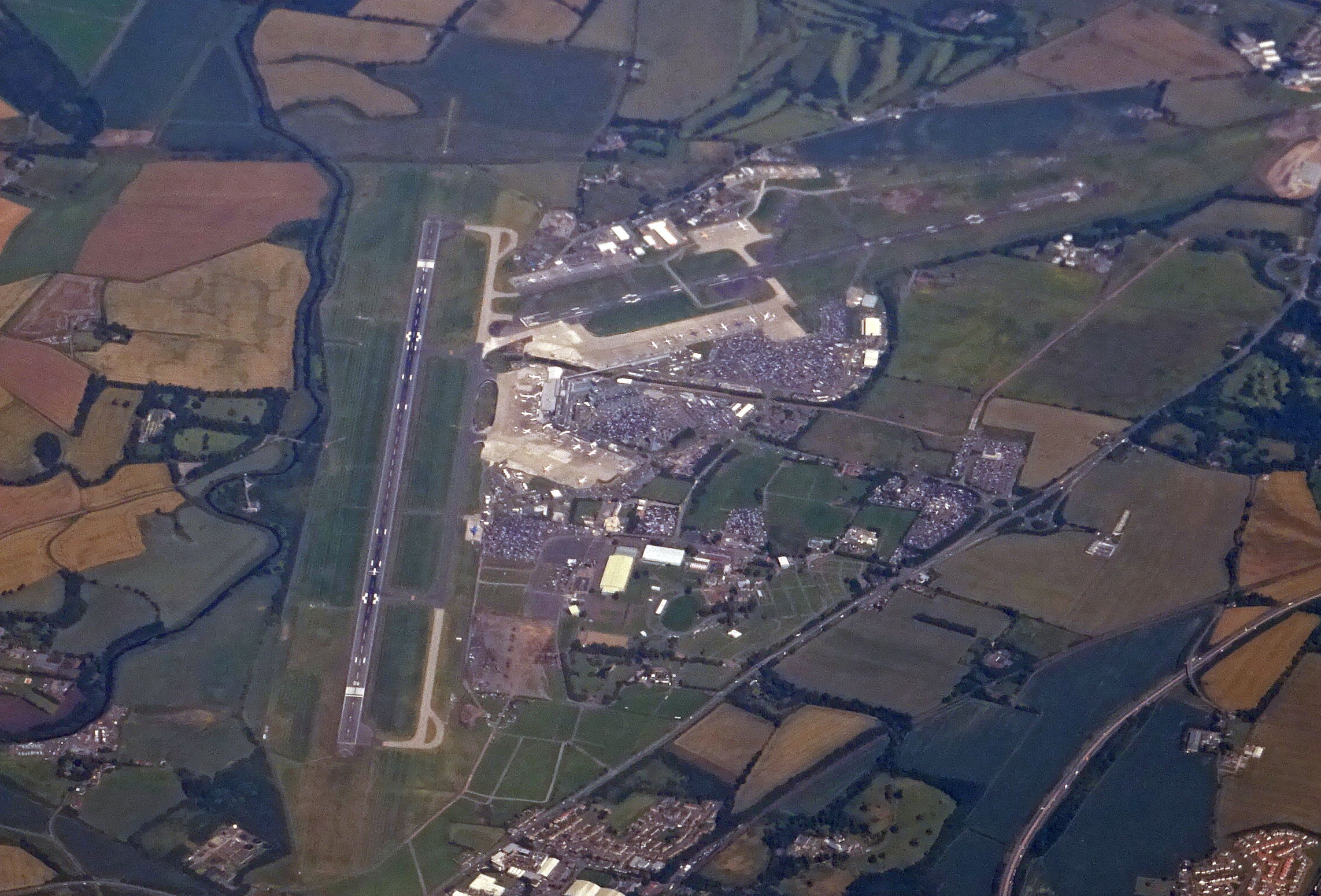
Edinburgh Airport aerial image before the closure of the second runway.

In 2013, a further extension to the passenger terminal was announced, taking the terminal building up to the Edinburgh Airport tram stop. The Edinburgh Trams opening in May 2014 created the first rail connection to Edinburgh Airport. Whilst the number of passengers has increased, the number of flights decreased in 2014 due to planes operating at a higher capacity.

A new £25million expansion project involving the construction of a new 6,000 m^{2} (65,000 sq ft) building, housing a security hall and retail areas, was also completed.

In February 2016, consultancy firm Biggar Economics announced that Edinburgh Airport contributes almost £1 billion annually to the Scottish economy. As part of the expansion works, Runway 12/30 was officially withdrawn from use on 29 March 2018.

=== VINCI ownership ===
On 17 April 2024, Vinci SA announced that it had reached an agreement with GIP to acquire a 50.01% shareholding of the airport for £1.27 billion, with GIP retaining 49.99%. The transaction was concluded on 25 June 2024.

In December 2024, Edinburgh Airport became the first in Scotland to record over 15 million passengers in a calendar year.

On 21 September 2026, Vinci and GIP announced that they would be investing £500 million over the next 5 years to expand the airport. There are plans for an expanded check-in hall, arrival facilities, baggage reclaim area and departure lounge, and new areas for food and drink.

== Airlines and destinations ==
=== Passenger ===
The following airlines operate regular scheduled flights to and from Edinburgh:

Airlines	Destinations
Aegean Airlines	Athens
Aer Lingus	Belfast–City, Dublin
Air Canada	Seasonal: Montréal–Trudeau, Toronto–Pearson
Air France	Paris–Charles de Gaulle
American Airlines	Seasonal: New York–JFK, Philadelphia
Atlantic Airways	Seasonal: Vágar
Aurigny	Guernsey
Austrian Airlines	Seasonal: Vienna
British Airways	London–City, London–Heathrow; Seasonal: Florence, Palma de Mallorca, San Sebastián, Split (begins 15 May 2027)
Brussels Airlines	Brussels
Delta Air Lines	New York–JFK; Seasonal: Atlanta, Boston
easyJet	Agadir, Alicante, Amsterdam, Athens, Barcelona, Basel/Mulhouse, Belfast–International, Berlin, Birmingham, Bristol, Copenhagen, Derry, Düsseldorf, Enfidha, Geneva, Kraków, Lanzarote, Lisbon, Ljubljana, London–Gatwick, London–Luton, London–Southend, London–Stansted, Lyon, Madrid, Málaga, Milan–Linate, Milan–Malpensa, Munich, Naples, Paphos, Paris–Charles de Gaulle, Reykjavik–Keflavik, Sharm El Sheikh, Tenerife–South, Venice, Zurich; Seasonal: Antalya, Belfast–City, Bilbao (resumes 30 March 2027), Bordeaux, Catania, Corfu, Dalaman, Dubrovnik, Fuerteventura, Gran Canaria, Grenoble, Hamburg (resumes 29 March 2027), Heraklion, Hurghada, Innsbruck, Jersey, Marrakesh, Nice, Olbia, Palma de Mallorca, Prague, Rhodes, Rome-Fiumicino (begins 30 March 2027), Rovaniemi, Tivat (begins 29 March 2027), Tromsø (begins 30 November 2026)
Edelweiss Air	Zurich
Emirates	Dubai–International
Eurowings	Cologne/Bonn, Düsseldorf, Stuttgart
Finnair	Helsinki
Hainan Airlines	Beijing–Capital
Iberia Express	Seasonal: Madrid
Icelandair	Reykjavik–Keflavik
Jet2.com	Alicante, Antalya, Fuerteventura,Funchal, Gran Canaria, Lanzarote, Málaga, Rome–Fiumicino, Sharm El Sheikh (begins 16 February 2027), Tenerife–South; Seasonal: Bergen, Bodrum, Burgas, Catania, Chambéry, Chania (begins 5 May 2027), Corfu, Dalaman, Dubrovnik, Faro, Geneva, Girona, Heraklion, Ibiza, Innsbruck, Kalamata, Kefalonia, Kos, Larnaca, Malta, Menorca, Naples, Palma de Mallorca, Paphos, Prague, Preveza/Lefkada, Pula Reus, Rhodes, Salzburg, Santorini, Skiathos (begins 6 May 2027), Split, Thessaloniki, Turin, Verona, Vienna, Zakynthos
JetBlue	Seasonal: Boston, New York–JFK
KLM	Amsterdam
Loganair	Exeter, Isle of Man, Kirkwall, Southampton, Stornoway, Sumburgh
Lufthansa	Frankfurt, Munich
Luxair	Luxembourg
Norwegian Air Shuttle	Copenhagen, Oslo, Stockholm–Arlanda; Seasonal: Bergen, Billund
Pegasus Airlines	Istanbul–Sabiha Gökçen
Qatar Airways	Doha
Ryanair	Agadir, Alicante, Barcelona, Bari, Beauvais, Belfast–International, Bergamo, Berlin, Bologna, Bournemouth, Bratislava, Bucharest–Otopeni, Budapest, Charleroi, Copenhagen, Cork, Dublin, Faro, Fuerteventura, Funchal, Gdańsk, Gran Canaria, Kaunas, Knock, Kraków, Lanzarote, Lisbon, Málaga, London–Stansted, Madrid, Málaga, Malta, Marrakesh, Milan–Malpensa, Nantes, Naples, Palermo, Porto, Poznań, Prague, Riga, Rome–Ciampino, Rzeszów, Santander, Seville, Shannon, Sofia, Tenerife–South, Tirana, Venice, Vienna, Warsaw–Modlin, Weeze, Wroclaw; Seasonal: Bergerac, Béziers, Biarritz, Corfu, Gothenburg, Ibiza, Marseille, Newquay, Palma de Mallorca, Pisa, Poitiers, Rhodes, Toulouse, Valencia, Zadar
Scandinavian Airlines	Stockholm–Arlanda; Seasonal: Copenhagen
SunExpress	Antalya; Seasonal: Dalaman
Transavia	Seasonal: Paris–Orly
TUI Airways	Seasonal: Chambéry, Corfu, Innsbruck, Palma de Mallorca
Turkish Airlines	Istanbul
United Airlines	Newark, Washington–Dulles; Seasonal: Chicago–O'Hare
Vueling	Barcelona, Bilbao
Virgin Atlantic	Seasonal: Orlando
WestJet	Seasonal: Calgary, Halifax, Toronto–Pearson

=== Cargo ===
Airlines	Destinations
ASL Airlines France	Paris–Charles de Gaulle, Teesside
DHL Aviation	Leipzig/Halle
FedEx Express	Paris–Charles de Gaulle, Teesside

== Statistics ==
=== Passenger numbers ===
Year	Passengers (Note: per CAA Table 9; Terminal and Transit Passengers)	Aircraft movements (Note: per CAA Table 4.1 Air Transport Movements by Type and Nationality of Operator)	Notes
1985	1,578,000	36,926	
1986	1,651,000	36,596	
1987	1,852,000	39,603	
1988	2,080,000	40,664	
1989	2,369,000	47,100	
1990	2,495,000	47,900	
1991	2,343,000	49,700	
1992	2,539,000	56,400	
1993	2,721,000	58,800	
1994	3,001,000	61,100	
1995	3,280,000	64,000	
1996	3,810,000	68,800	
1997	4,214,919	99,352	
1998	4,588,507	100,134	
1999	5,119,258	101,226	
2000	5,519,372	102,393	
2001	6,067,333	112,361	
2002	6,930,649	118,416	
2003	7,481,454	118,943	
2004	8,017,547	125,317	
2005	8,456,739	127,122	
2006	8,611,345	126,914	
2007	9,047,558	128,172	
2008	9,006,702	125,550	
2009	9,049,355	115,969	
2010	8,596,715	108,997	
2011	9,385,245	113,357	
2012	9,195,061	110,288	
2013	9,775,443	111,736	
2014	10,160,004	109,545	
2015	11,114,587	115,286	
2016	12,348,425	122,220	
2017	13,410,256	128,675	
2018	14,310,403	130,016	
2019	14,737,497	127,335	
2020	3,474,879	43,634	(Note: Scheduled flights were suspended for periods throughout 2020 due to the COVID-19 pandemic, therefore resulting in significantly reduced passenger numbers for the year.)
2021	3,024,960	39,457	
2022	11,250,211	93,004	
2023	14,396,794	111,335	
2024	15,780,353	116,693	
2025	16,970,685	120,927	
Source: CAA Statistics

=== Busiest routes ===
Busiest international routes to and from Edinburgh (2025)
Rank	Destination	Passengers	Change 2024 to 2025
1	Dublin	788,784	▲7%
2	Amsterdam	751,969	▲10%
3	Paris-Charles de Gaulle	499,517	▲9%
4	Doha-Hamad	373,727	▼2%
5	Tenerife-South	362,386	▲4%
6	Copenhagen	280,574	▲3%
7	Barcelona	268,386	▲27%
8	Frankfurt	257,262	%
9	Alicante	249,926	%
10	Geneva	244,051	▲10%
Source: CAA Statistics

Busiest domestic routes to and from Edinburgh (2025)
Rank	Destination	Passengers	Change 2024 to 2025
1	London Heathrow	1,089,492	▼6%
2	London Stansted	723,196	▲4%
3	Belfast International	517,412	%
4	London Gatwick	451,265	▼5%
5	Bristol	436,664	▼3%
6	London City	333,312	▼1%
7	London Luton	318,694	▼6%
8	Birmingham	300,226	▲10%
9	Belfast City	126,670	▼3%
10	Southampton	82,130	▼1%
Source: CAA Statistics

== Ground transport ==
=== Bus ===
Several operators provide bus services from the airport:

- Ember - provides services to Aberdeen, Dundee, Fife, Fort William and Inverness.
- Lothian Buses - provides services from the airport and Edinburgh.
- Scottish Citylink provides services from the airport to Glasgow, North Lanarkshire, Oban, Stirling & West Lothian.
- Stagecoach South Scotland - provides a service from the airport to Fife.
- Xplore Dundee - provides a service to Dundee.

A coach park also provides services from various operators.

=== Road ===
The airport lies on the A8 road, and can be reached by the M8 motorway and the M9 motorway. The airport can also be reached from the M90 motorway via the Queensferry Crossing.

=== Train ===
The airport has no dedicated railway station. However, it is served by the nearby Edinburgh Gateway station, which serves as an interchange with Edinburgh Trams services to the airport. The tram line also connects the airport to the nearby Edinburgh Park railway station.

A more extensive Edinburgh Airport Rail Link project to provide a direct heavy rail link was cancelled in 2007 due to increasing costs.

=== Tram ===
The airport is served by Edinburgh Trams, a light rail link.

The line from the airport travels eastwards through the western suburbs and the city centre of Edinburgh before heading north to Leith, eventually terminating at Newhaven.

Preceding station	Edinburgh Trams	Following station
Ingliston Park & Ride towards Newhaven	Newhaven - Edinburgh Airport	Terminus

== Accidents and incidents ==
- On 20 July 1970, a Hawker Siddeley HS-125-3B (G-AXPS) operated by the Imperial Tobacco Company crashed on takeoff from Turnhouse on an empty positioning flight to Newcastle. The aircraft was a total loss and whilst the pilot was uninjured, the copilot was declared dead on arrival at the hospital. The probable cause of the crash was thought to be the application of an incorrect rudder following a simulated engine failure on take-off. The reason for this application of an incorrect rudder has not been determined.
- A De Havilland Moth Minor (G-AFOZ) crashed at Turnhouse during a low-level display on 3 May 1975. One of the two occupants died in the hospital the following day.
- On 27 February 2001, Loganair flight 670A, a Shorts 360 (G-BNMT) operating a Royal Mail flight to Belfast, crashed into the Firth of Forth shortly after taking off from Edinburgh at 1730 GMT. Both crew members were killed, but there were no passengers on board. A fatal accident inquiry later blamed a buildup of slush in the aircraft's engines before the crash. A protective covering had not been fitted to the engine intakes while the aircraft was parked at Edinburgh for several hours in heavy snow.
