= Edinburgh Gateway station =

Railway station in Edinburgh, Scotland

Edinburgh Gateway Scottish Gaelic: Slighe Dhùn Èideann
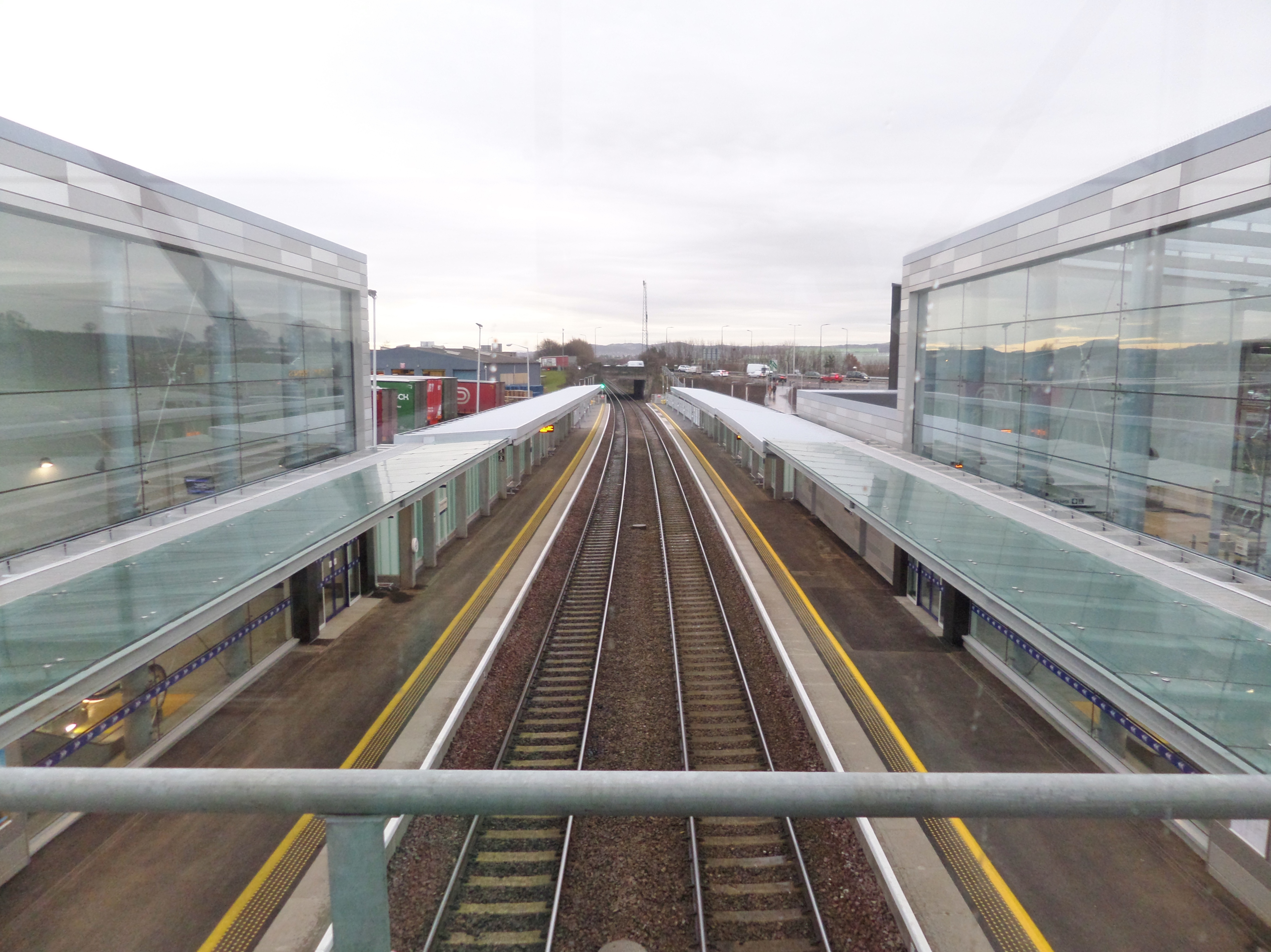
- Edinburgh Gateway station, view south from the pedestrian over-bridge

General information
- Location: Gogar, Edinburgh; Scotland
- Coordinates: 55.941°N 3.320°W
- Grid reference: NT176727
- Owner: Network Rail; Edinburgh Trams
- Manager: ScotRail
- Platforms: 4 (2 National Rail & 2 Edinburgh Trams)

Other information
- Station code: EGY

Key dates
- 11 December 2016: Opened

Passengers
- 2020/21: ▼44,450
- Interchange: ▼304
- 2021/22: ▲0.117 million
- Interchange: ▲1,212
- 2022/23: ▲0.186 million
- Interchange: ▲7,755
- 2023/24: ▲0.225 million
- Interchange: ▲11,765
- 2024/25: ▲0.255 million
- Interchange: ▲16,732
Location
Notes
- Passenger statistics from the Office of Rail and Road

Edinburgh Gateway station is a railway station and interchange at Gogar in Edinburgh, Scotland, which opened on 11 December 2016. It is served by ScotRail and Edinburgh Trams, and serves both Gogar and Edinburgh Airport, to which it is connected by the tram line.

== Background ==
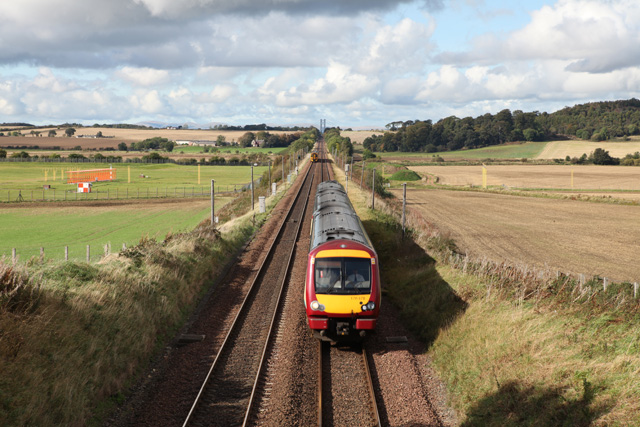
ScotRail trains passing Edinburgh Airport taken from Stenhouse Bridge, around a mile and a half northwest of the site of Edinburgh Gateway.

As part of the Strategic Transports Project Review, which plans what is going to happen with Scotland's transport over the next 20 years, 29 investment priorities were identified in support of the future growth of Scotland's businesses and communities. One of these was the construction of Gogar station for better access to Edinburgh Airport through onward travel on the Edinburgh tram network as well as the rest of the area through the integration with the tram system. This may be to compensate for the scrapping of the Edinburgh Airport Rail Link and the station was part of the original proposal. The station would also thought to be delivered sooner.

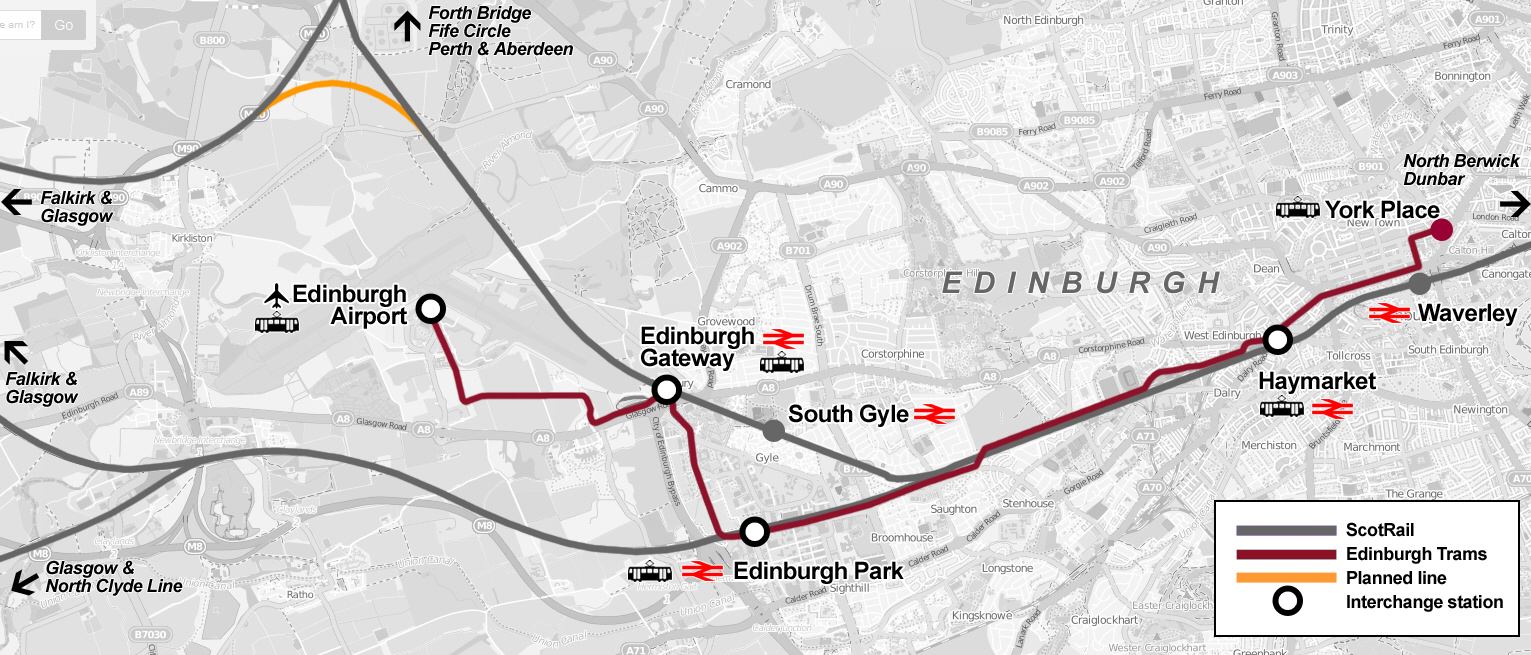
Edinburgh Gateway tram connections map

=== EGIP ===
The railway station is part of the Edinburgh to Glasgow Improvement Programme (EGIP), a major Scottish transport project involving infrastructure improvements and electrification of most railway lines between Glasgow and Edinburgh. It was intended that services between the two cities will increase to 13 trains per hour with fastest time being 35 minutes but after the Scottish Department For Transport reviewed the project, it was down scaled and services will continue to be every 15 minutes but with new, longer electric trains, which will at least meet the journey time targets originally set out. The project also includes the electrification of eight routes and 350 km (220 mi) of existing lines. The Shotts Line will have an increase in services with the provision of a limited express service.

== Location and infrastructure ==
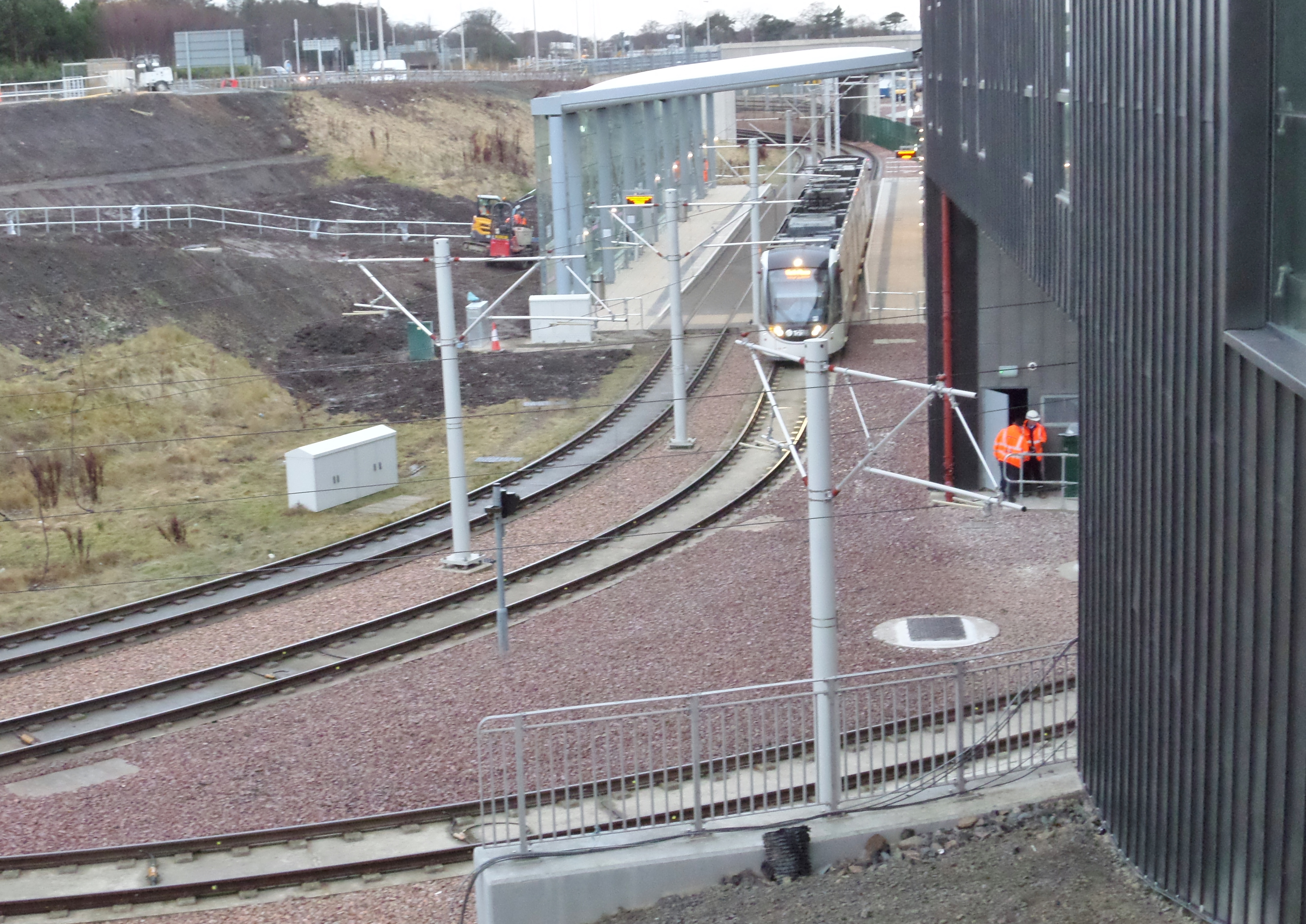
An Edinburgh Tram passing Edinburgh Gateway tram stop

The railway station is located at the A8 to the east of Gogar. The station has two platforms. The platforms have been constructed to accommodate the longest trains currently operating in Scotland (London North Eastern Railway). A chord is proposed a few miles to the north of the station, near the River Almond crossing, to provide another link between Glasgow and Edinburgh with potential for increasing services through.

The original design for the station included a 1st floor and high level bridge but following consultation these were removed with an at-grade bridge providing easier access. The design of the station is to provide a secure covered area for parking of 100 cycles as well as five cycle lockers. This is located next to the station building and is monitored by CCTV. Lifts inside the station building are large enough to accommodate bicycles. The station provides an interchange with Edinburgh Trams to Edinburgh and the airport as well as providing pedestrian access to The Gyle Shopping Centre through an underpass under the A8.

== History ==
Network Rail submitted its plans for the interchange on 9 October 2009 following completion of the pre-planning submission consultation. Gogar was the first infrastructure project to go the through the National Planning Framework. The consultation involved four public exhibitions with clear public support for the investments and the proposal.

When the tram line was built in 2013, provision was made for Edinburgh Gateway but it would not open until the same time as the railway station. In February 2015, a contract to build the station was awarded to Balfour Beatty with work commencing in April 2015. The new station building was designed by IDP Architects.

In June 2016 the station was badly vandalised while still under construction. Vehicles and windows were damaged.

Edinburgh Gateway station was officially opened by the Scottish Government Minister for Transport and the Islands Humza Yousaf on 9 November 2016. The station opened to the public on 11 December 2016.

== Services ==
Edinburgh Gateway station is served half-hourly by trains operating on the Fife Circle Line, and hourly by services operating to Perth, Dundee and Inverness.

Fife Circle trains scheduled to stop at Edinburgh Gateway will normally skip the nearby South Gyle station.

All Edinburgh Trams services are currently scheduled to call at Edinburgh Gateway.

Preceding station	National Rail	Following station
South Gyle or Haymarket	ScotRail; Fife Circle Line	Dalmeny
Preceding station	Edinburgh Trams	Following station
Gyle Centre towards Newhaven	Newhaven – Edinburgh Airport	Gogarburn towards Edinburgh Airport
