= Rachel House (disambiguation) =

Rachel House may refer to

- Rachel House (born 1971), New Zealand actress
- Rachel House, a Scottish children's hospital
