= Lothian Airlink =

Edinburgh City to Airport bus

Lothian Airlink 100
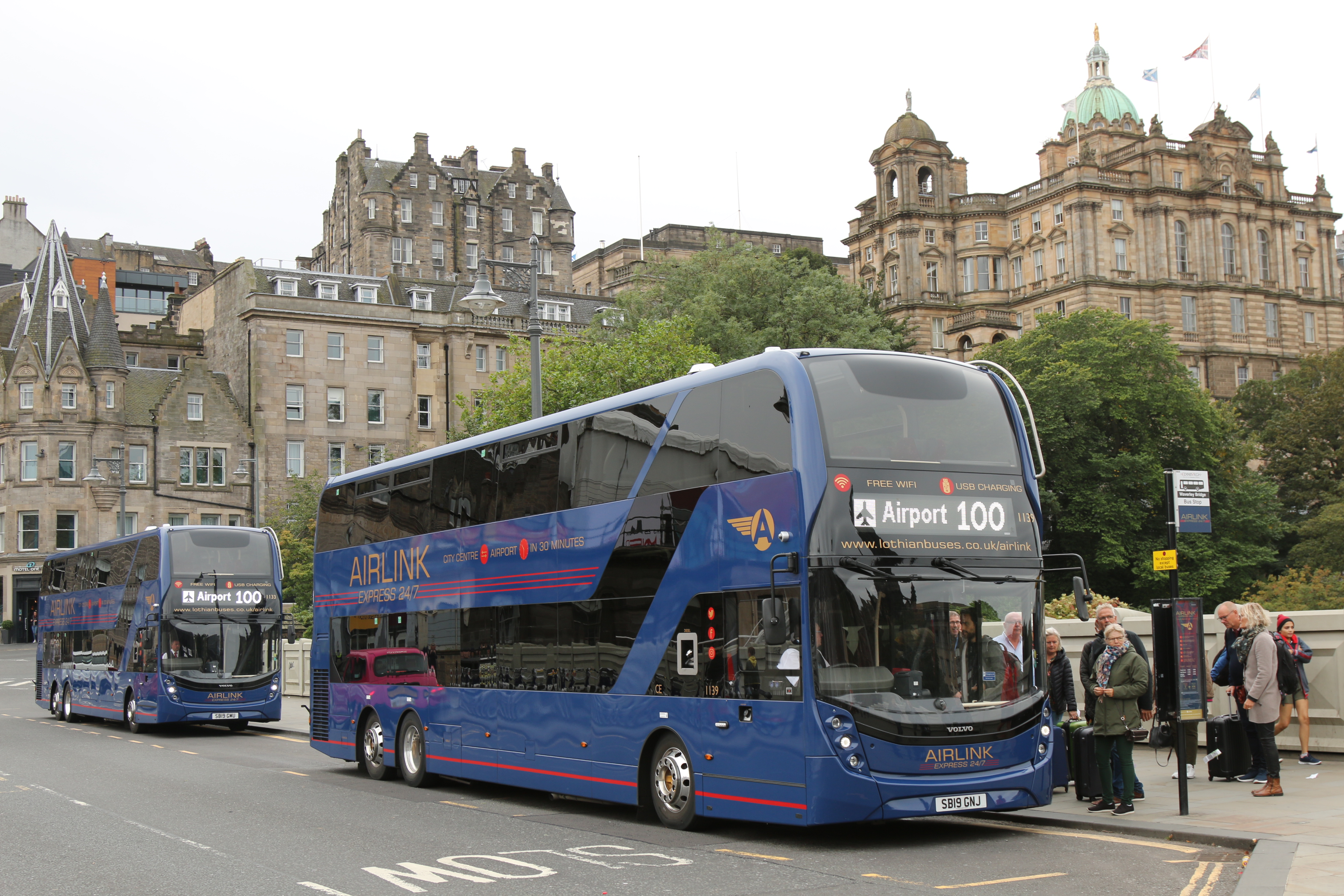
- Airlink branded Alexander Dennis Enviro400 XLB bodied Volvo B8Ls at the Waverley Bridge terminus in September 2019

Overview
- Operator: Lothian Buses
- Vehicle: Volvo B8L Alexander Dennis Enviro400 XLB

Route
- Locale: Edinburgh
- Termini: Edinburgh Airport; Waverley Bridge
- Length: 30 minutes

Service
- Frequency: Every 10 minutes
- Daily ridership: ~3,000 (As of 2017)
- Annual patronage: ~1,000,000 (As of 2017)

The Airlink 100 is a bus service operated by Lothian Buses, which links Edinburgh City Centre, Haymarket, Edinburgh Zoo, and Corstorphine with Edinburgh Airport. It is operated by a fleet of high-specification Volvo B8L Alexander Dennis Enviro400 XLB tri-axle double decker buses, presented in a distinctive blue and red livery.

Airlink operates as a premium airport link, featuring a uniform high-specification fleet, rather than the mixed vehicles seen on other Lothian routes, this combined with the services frequency has made it particularly popular with passengers.

== History ==
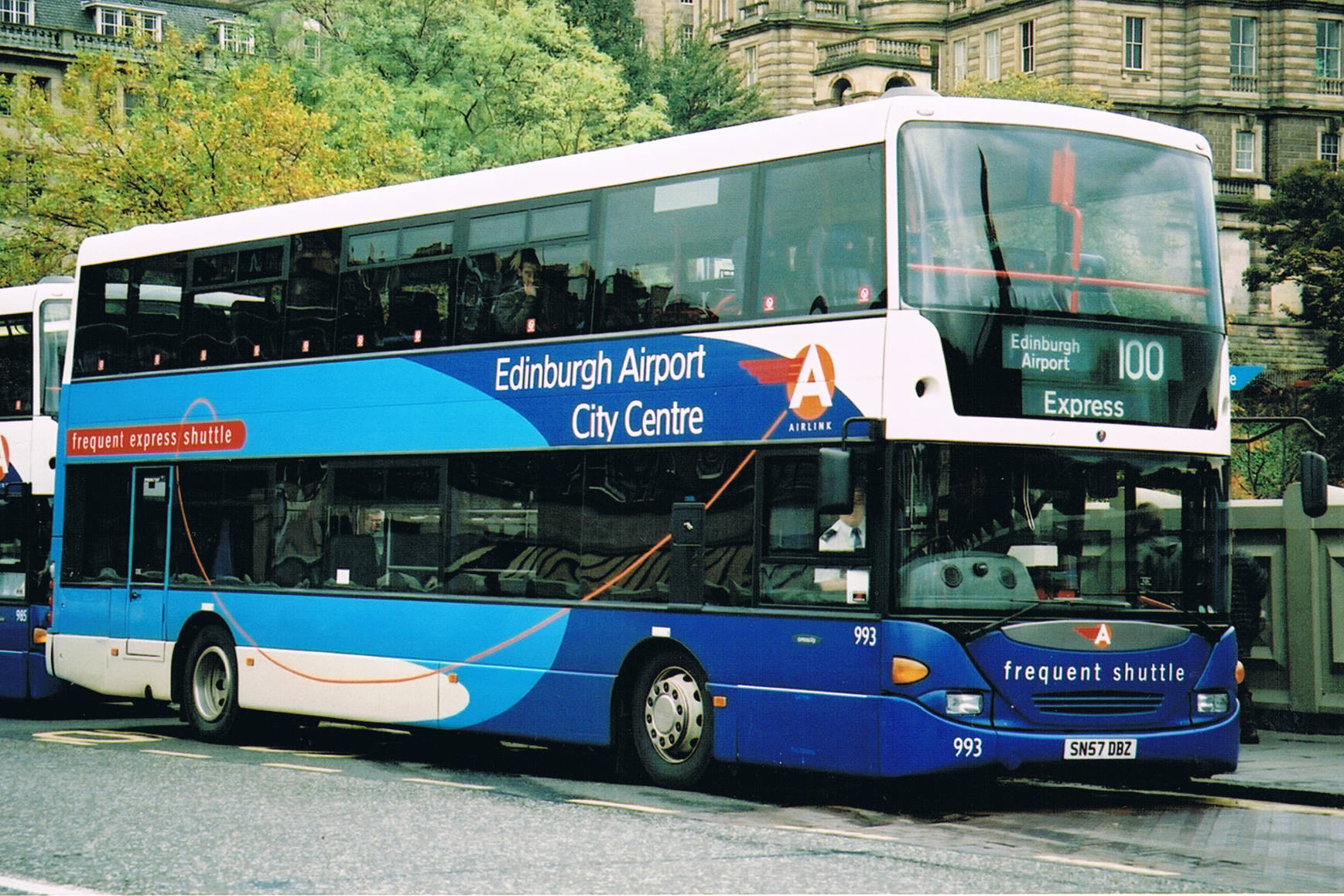
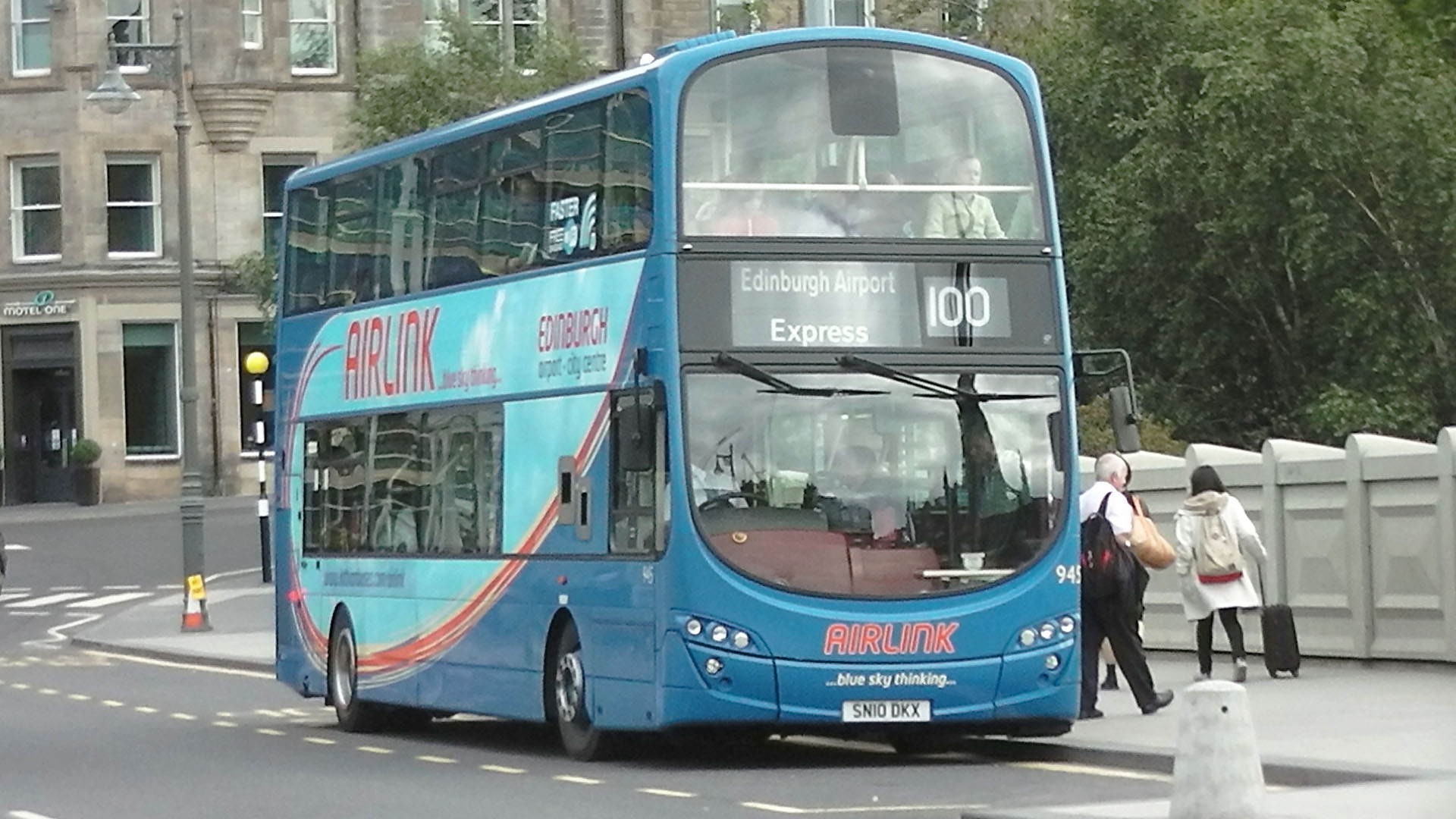
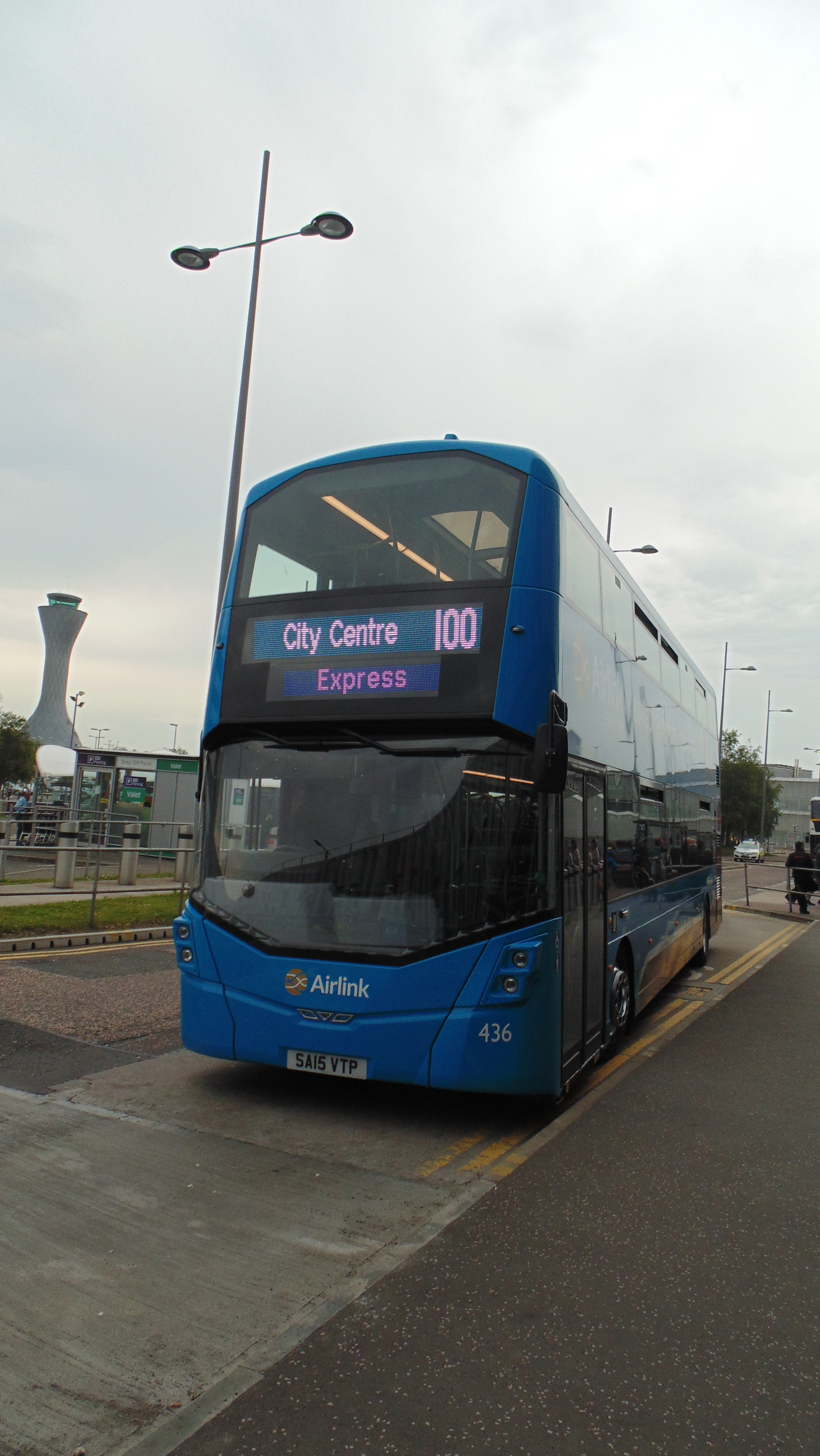
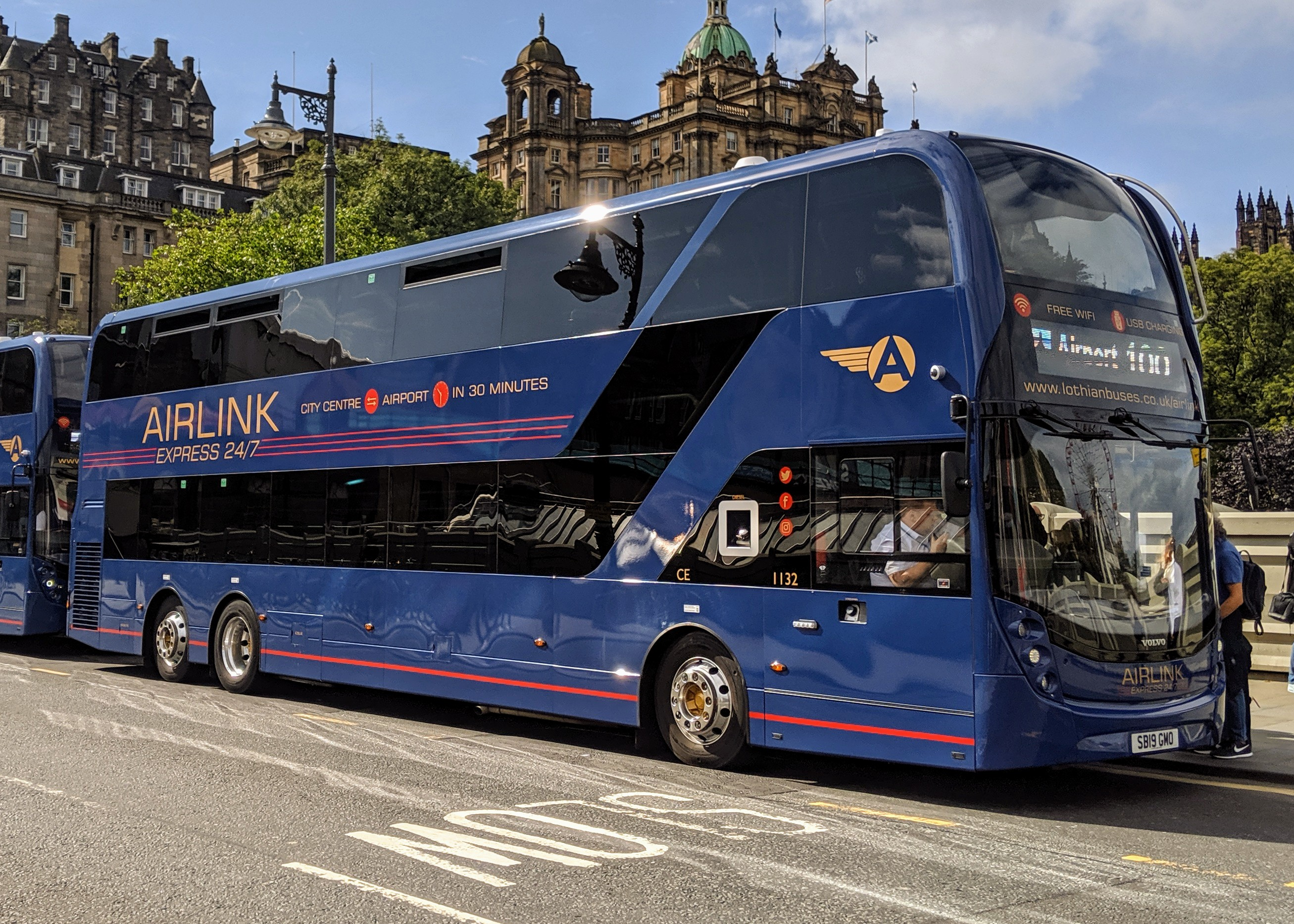
A selection of Airlink buses throughout the years

In the 1990s, the service operated under "Airline" branding, using a standard fleet of Leyland Olympians in a light blue livery distinct from Lothian's madder red city fleet. From 1999 to 2001 they were replaced by low-floor Dennis Trident 2 buses with Plaxton President bodies, marking a shift towards accessibility. Around this time the Airlink brand was introduced, with the service now being presented as a premium airport connection focusing on enhanced comfort.

In 2010, the Airlink fleet was modernised again, with the introduction of 14 Wright Eclipse Gemini 2-bodied Volvo B9TLs. These buses featured leather seats, USB charging, onboard Wi-Fi, CCTV, and dedicated luggage racks on the bottom deck, reinforcing the premium image of the brand.

In 2015, 12 Wright Gemini 3 bodied Volvo B5TLs were added to the fleet, featuring a lighter blue body with gold accents and trim, the same livery later used on the Skylink 200/400 services, which are now under Lothian City branding and operate as services 17 and 18.

In 2017, Airlink became the first Lothian service to pilot contactless payments, allowing passengers to tap smartphones or credit cards for to pay for the bus. By December, the service celebrated its one-millionth passenger of the year traveling from Edinburgh Airport, indicating an approximate daily ridership of 3,000 during that year.

In 2019, Lothian ordered 15 Alexander Dennis Enviro400 XLB-bodied Volvo B8L buses for the Airlink service. These tri-axle buses feature a revised dark blue livery with cleaner branding, audio announcements highlighting tourist attractions such as Edinburgh Castle, and screens displaying stop information.

In 2021, the nighttime frequency was doubled from every 30 minutes to every 15 minutes, bringing it in line with the daytime service. In 2022, the daytime frequency was further increased to every 10 minutes, making Airlink comparable to the trams, which run every seven minutes.

On 30 June 2024, the City Centre terminus was temporarily moved from South St David Street to Waverley Bridge because of building work at the former Jenners' store. At the same time, an additional stop in Hanover Street was introduced. The arrangement was expected to last for two years.

== See also ==
- Edinburgh Airport Rail Link
- Transport for Edinburgh
- Harrogate bus route 36
- The Witch Way
- Lothian Buses
- Transport in Edinburgh
