= Lothian Buses =

Municipal bus operator in Edinburgh and the Lothians

Lothian Buses Ltd.

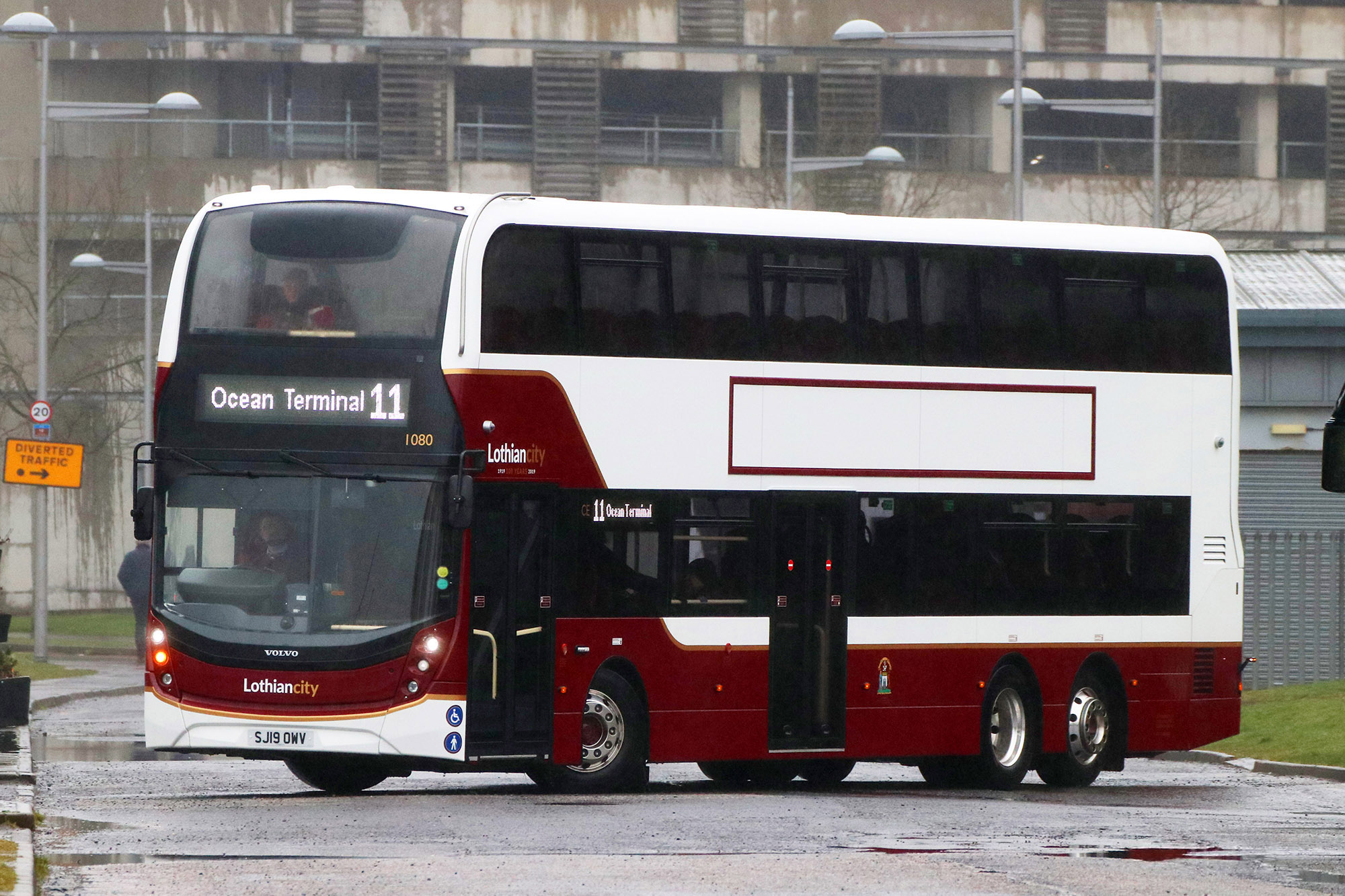
- Alexander Dennis Enviro400 XLB bodied Volvo B8L in March 2019
- Parent: Edinburgh Transport Holdings (91%); Midlothian Council (5%); East Lothian Council (3%); West Lothian Council (1%)
- Founded: 1 July 1919; 107 years ago
- Headquarters: Edinburgh, Scotland
- Service area: Edinburgh; East Lothian; Midlothian; West Lothian
- Service type: Bus services Open top bus tours Executive Tours
- Alliance: Edinburgh Trams
- Routes: 63 daytime, 19 night buses
- Stops: 2,900
- Depots: Longstone (LS); Central (CE); Marine (MA); Musselburgh (MU); North Berwick (NB); Seafield (SF); Newbridge (NE); Livingston (LV); Dunbar (Eve Coaches)
- Fleet: 730 (January 2025)
- Annual ridership: 110 million (2023)
- Chief executive: George Lowder
- Website: www.lothianbuses.com https://edinburghtour.com https://lothianmotorcoaches.com https://www.eveinfo.co.uk

Lothian Buses is a major bus operator based in Edinburgh, Scotland. It is the largest municipal bus company in the United Kingdom: the City of Edinburgh Council (through Edinburgh Transport Holdings) owns 91%, Midlothian Council 5%, East Lothian Council 3% and West Lothian Council 1%.

Lothian operates the majority of bus services in Edinburgh, and is a significant operator in East Lothian, Midlothian and most recently West Lothian. It operates a comprehensive night bus network, three routes to Edinburgh Airport, and owns the subsidiary companies Lothian Country, East Coast Buses, Edinburgh Bus Tours, Lothian Motorcoaches and Eve Coaches.

== History ==
The company can trace its history back to the Edinburgh Street Tramways Company of 1871, also involving at various times the tramway companies of Leith, Musselburgh and Edinburgh North. The City Council (Edinburgh Corporation Tramways Department) took over operation of the tramways in 1919, at which time most of the system was cable operated. Electrification of the tram network was completed in 1923, but the first motor buses had arrived in 1919.

The city's trams ceased operation between 1950 and 1956, after which the operation became the Edinburgh Corporation Transport Department. In 1965, it purchased its first rear-engined double-decker bus, a Leyland Atlantean PDR1/1 (registration ESF 801C). This bus is currently preserved at the Scottish Vintage Bus Museum. Almost 600 buses were added to the fleet over the next 17 years.

Following local government reorganisation, Edinburgh Corporation Transport was renamed Lothian Region Transport on 16 May 1975. In January 2000, it was again renamed as Lothian Buses.

=== Awards ===
Lothian Buses have won several bus awards for their services to the Lothian region including in the 2007 UK Bus Awards, and has subsequently been voted Public Transport Operator of the Year (Bus) at the 2008 National Transport Awards, at which the company was cited for its substantial route development, 32% growth in passenger numbers since 1998 and £100 million investment in low-floor buses since 2000.

Lothian Buses was voted Best UK Bus Company in 2002 and 2003. Vehicles previously carried the wording "Voted Scotland's Best Bus Company 2006" in a laurel wreath type logo near the fleetname.

In November 2011, the company won the Top City Operator of the Year award at the UK Bus Awards.

In June 2023, Lothian Buses received the Excellence in Transport Accessibility award and the Excellence in Innovation and Technology award at the Scottish Transport Awards. In 2024, the company was named Bus Operator of the Year at the National Transport Awards. Lothian Buses was also awarded the Gold Employer Recognition Scheme Award from the Ministry of Defence and the silver award in the Employer of the Year category at the Scottish Veteran Awards. In 2025, its Lothian Country Service 43 received the Excellence in Transport Best Bus Service award.

== Fares ==
Lothian Buses have operated a flat-fare system since March 2006. Adult and child singles and day tickets, pre-paid multiple singles and 'Ridacards' are also available, with senior citizens travelling on free travel passes in line with the rest of Scotland. As of March 2026, an adult single fare is £2.40 and a child fare costs £1.20. An adult day ticket costs £6.00 and a child day ticket £3.00.

Cash fares are paid into a hopper, which automatically dumps the money into a vault to which the driver has no access; change is not given.

The Lothian 'Ridacard' bus pass is a pre-paid plastic smartcard giving unlimited travel on regular daytime and night bus services, as well as Edinburgh Trams services. It is purchased initially from a TravelHub, where the owner's picture is incorporated on the card to prevent misuse. Once purchased, the card can be placed onto an on-board reader, which reads the contactless chip in the smartcard. Cards can be credited for a weekly, 4 weekly or annual period. A warning is displayed on the last five days of validity. The card can then be topped up at TravelHubs or PayPoint equipped retailers.

Lothian Buses launched contactless payment on their day network in 2019. Passengers can pay their fare by tapping their contactless debit or credit card when boarding the bus. Daily and weekly capping apply. Passengers who make just one or two journeys in a day are charged the normal single fares; a daily cap is applied when three or more journeys are made. Weekly capping works on the same principle. Passengers who pay with a debit or credit card can view their journey history for the previous seven days on the Lothian website.

Regular Lothian Bus services running within Edinburgh and the west of East Lothian operate a flat fare, but from Longniddry, Macmerry and Ormiston there is a zonal system with East Coast Buses having six zones.

== Network, brands and subsidiaries ==
=== Lothian-branded network ===
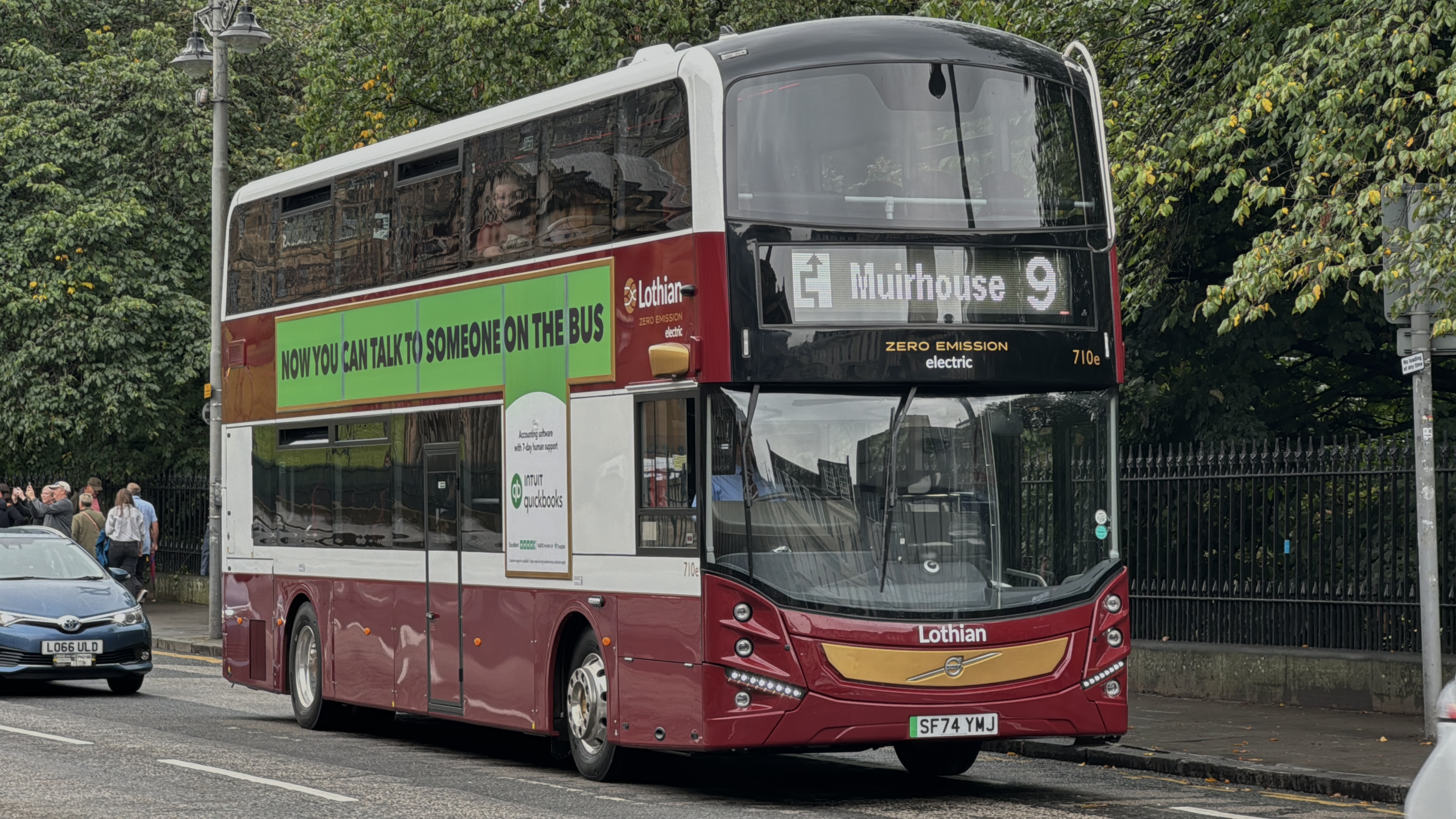
MCV bodied Volvo BZL battery electric bus in September 2024

Lothian-branded services are the core of the Lothian Buses group. There are some core services in the Lothian network that have followed more or less the same route since they were operated by trams in the 1950s, like services 3, 4, 5, 10, 11 and 16. However, the routes and timetables of most services are frequently modified in minor ways. For example, in recent years several confusing details such as letter suffixed routes and clockwise/anticlockwise circular services have been removed from the map. In the last ten years, there have been many temporary and permanent diversions in the New Town, including the closure at various times of Princes Street for tram works, George Street for pedestrianisation and Leith Street for the reconstruction of the St James Centre.

The majority of current routes pass through the city centre from opposing termini, either crossing or following Princes Street in full or in part. This means that there are some arteries in and out of the New Town that are served by as many as a dozen different routes, such as Nicolson Street and Leith Walk. Some of these services, like services 3, 26 and 37, extend into outlying towns in East Lothian and Midlothian. There are also some more orbital routes, such as service 38.

==== Liveries ====
Traditionally, Edinburgh Corporation, LRT and Lothian Buses had been generally painted in a madder (a dark red) and cream (or white) livery. When low floor disabled access vehicles were introduced in the late 1990s, they were given their own distinguishing "harlequin" livery, moquette covered seating and brightly coloured floors and walls. The last high step bus was removed from service by Lothian in the late 2000s, making the distinction irrelevant.

Lothian began to phase out the harlequin livery in May 2010, replacing it with a version of the traditional madder and white colour scheme. This had sweeping curved lines, having been updated to suit the body shapes of more modern buses. The last harlequin bus was repainted in 2016.

In late 2016 a new livery, known as the fleet of the future livery, was unveiled on a batch of new Wright Gemini 3 Streetdeck style buses, for route 22. The angular shape and style of this livery was a complete departure from anything Lothian had designed before, and as of 2021 is the standard livery for all new vehicles. The livery underwent a minor adjustment when a fleet of new Alexander Dennis Enviro400 XLBs were put into service in 2019, with smoother curves and a lack of a smaller 'cheatline' on the bus's lower sides. While the Enviro400 XLBs carried the coat of arms of the city of Edinburgh on each side, every batch of vehicles bought thereafter have not had the same coat of arms added.

=== Airlink and other airport routes ===
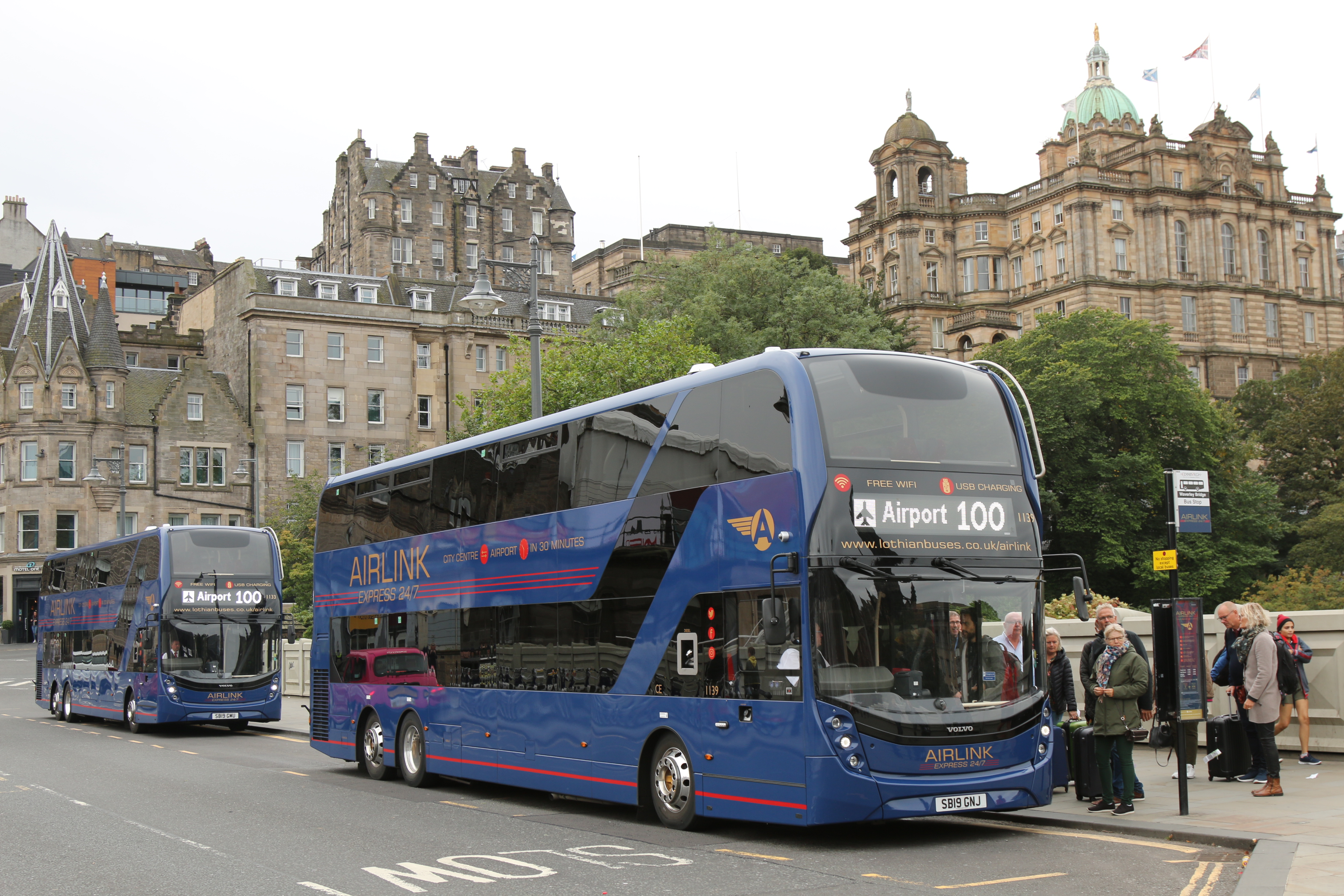
Alexander Dennis Enviro400 XLB bodied Volvo B8Ls in Airlink livery on Waverley Bridge

Lothian operates three services to and from Edinburgh Airport: Airlink 100, and Lothian City services 17 and 18. The airport is in a separate fare zone from the rest of the Lothian network, which means that fares to and from the airport are higher than the fares charged elsewhere on the network. However, this only applies to Airlink 100. On routes 17 and 18, the airport is treated as being in the same zone as the rest of the city.

==== Current airport routes ====
Airlink 100 runs to Waverley Bridge. Since 30 July 2017, Airlink has accepted contactless card payments as well as cash and ridacard fares.

Route 17 runs to Ocean Terminal and Route 18 runs to Fort Kinnard.

==== Former airport routes ====
Lothian also used to have a separate network of bus routes that ran to the Airport from places outside the city centre named Skylink. These routes were withdrawn from service and replaced with conventional city services on 6 April 2025.

Skylink 200 commenced on 23 April 2017, running from the airport to the north of Edinburgh, terminating at Ocean Terminal. It was initially operated by single decker buses, but double deckers have been used since 1 October 2017. This route was withdrawn in April 2025 and renumbered as service 17.

Skylink 300 commenced on 1 October 2017, as an upgrade and renumbering of the old service 35, which ran from the airport to the Ocean Terminal via Slateford, Longstone and South Gyle. The 35 had been a way of getting to the airport while only paying the standard Lothian fare, and usually used repainted ex-Airlink vehicles with extra luggage racks. The route was amended on 29 July 2018, shortening the route considerably and introducing a new terminal at Cameron Toll. At the same time, a modified 35 was reintroduced, but this service terminated at Heriot-Watt University rather than the airport. Skylink 300 was withdrawn from the timetable change on 11 September 2022 due to low passenger demand.

Skylink 400 commenced on 29 July 2018 operating to Fort Kinnaird via Gracemount, Fairmilehead, Oxgangs and Colinton. This route was withdrawn in April 2025 and has been renumbered as the 18, bringing back the old route and 'city' fares for the service pre-2018.

Between June 2021 and March 2022, Skylink services 200, 300, and 400 were adjusted to call at the Royal Highland Centre, which was in use as a vaccination centre during the COVID-19 pandemic. These services were reverted to their original routings when the centre closed in March 2022.

==== Liveries and vehicles ====
Airlink 100 was originally branded as "Airline", and has used many different liveries and logos, though all have been primarily blue. Airlink buses are always new when they start on the service, and are cascaded to other services after a few years. Over the years, the service has used the Leyland Olympian, Scania Omnicity, Wright Eclipse Gemini 2 and the Wright Eclipse Gemini 3. Between June 2017 and August 2019 the Airlink service used a light blue and grey version of the standard angular livery. These vehicles have since moved onto Skylink, still with the light blue livery. other Skylink services use a medium blue and white version of the angular livery. From August 2019, Enviro400 XLBs have been introduced on the Airlink Service, with a dark blue plain livery with a large gold Airlink logo on both sides.

=== East Coast Buses ===
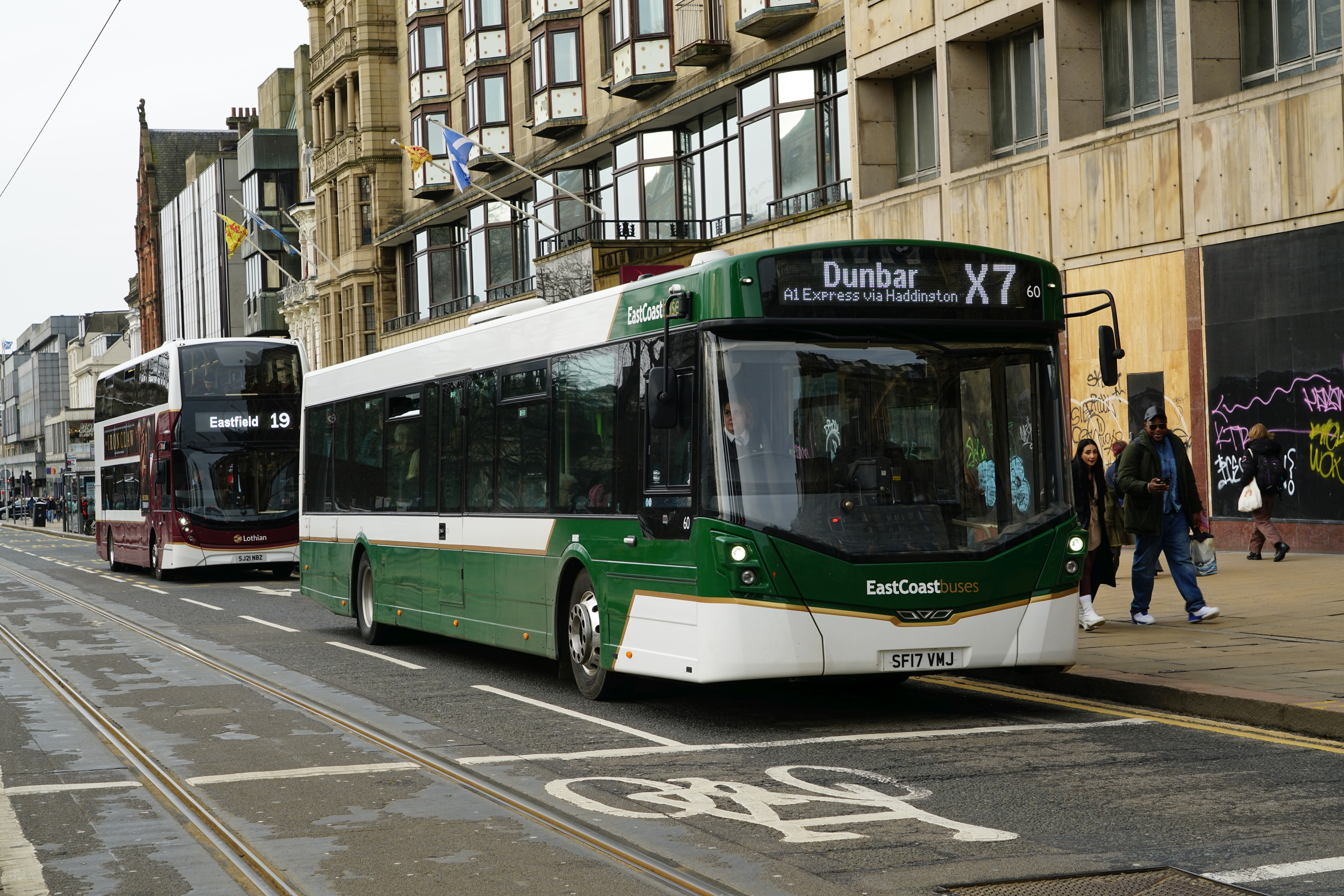
East Coast Buses Volvo B8RLE Wright Eclipse Urban 3 on Princes Street in January 2024

In summer 2012, First Scotland East withdrew route 44B from Edinburgh to Pencaitland. This prompted Lothian Buses to expand into East Lothian much further than they had for years; far past the Tranent terminus of the service 26. Operations were initially branded as East Lothian Buses, and service 113 launched on 12 June 2012. A second service was added in September 2014 (the 104 to Haddington). The brand name was changed to Lothian Country Buses. One reason for launching as a separate brand was to make it easier to introduce a zonal fare system, rather than the flat fare of Lothian Buses.

First Scotland East announced in June 2016 that they would be withdrawing entirely from East Lothian by 14 August, believing the county to be unprofitable. Lothian later announced the creation of a wholly owned subsidiary company, East Coast Buses, to again fill the gap left by First. The new company also took over the former First depots at North Berwick and Musselburgh, and took on many former First staff. From 23 April 2017, the two Lothian Country Buses routes were integrated into East Coast Buses.

==== Liveries and vehicles ====
East Lothian Buses services were initially operated by existing Lothian vehicles. The service was later operated by five Wright Eclipse bodied Volvo B7RLEs and two Plaxton President bodied Dennis Trident 2s. The East Lothian Buses/Lothian Country Buses livery was a version of the standard Lothian design featuring sweeping curved lines in bright green and cream, similar to the livery of the former Scottish Motor Traction/Eastern Scottish buses. East Coast Buses then used a version of the fleet of the future livery, the angular Lothian design, in green and grey (though the ECB green is slightly bluer than that formerly used by LCB).

In November 2021, Lothian Buses announced a new joint livery for subsidiaries Lothian Country and East Coast Buses. They were similar liveries with the only differences being the vinyls (logos) being put on the buses to signify which company was operating the service. As of November 2023, the repainting process has been completed.

=== Lothian Country ===
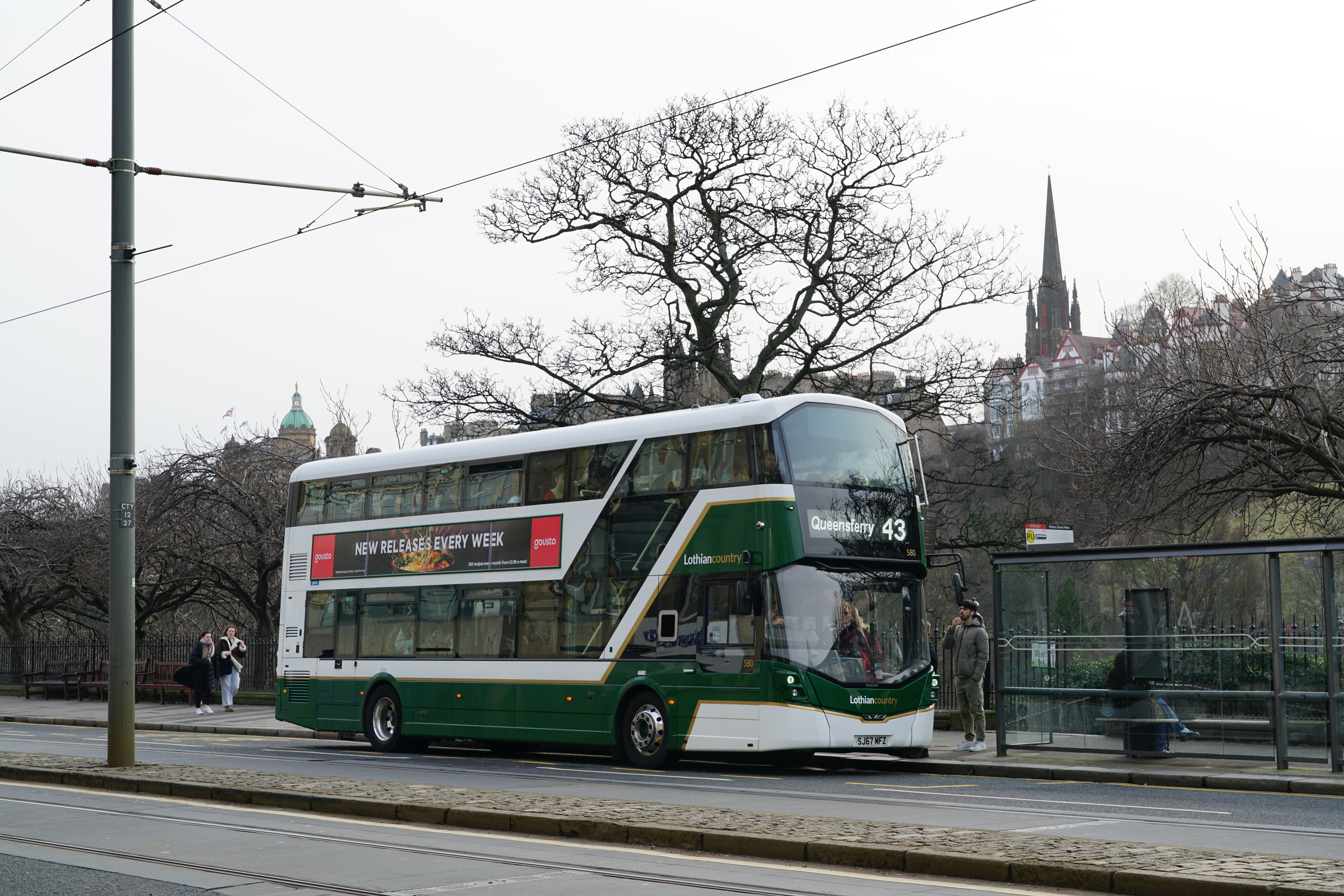
Lothian Country Wright Gemini 3 bodied Volvo B5LH on Princes Street in January 2024

In June 2017, a new subsidiary named Lothian Country commenced operating route 43 to South Queensferry after the previous operator Stagecoach East Scotland deemed the service not economically viable. This new operation re-used the then-recently defunct Lothian Country Buses brand, for unrelated services travelling the opposite direction out of the city.

On 19 August 2018, three new Lothian Country services to West Lothian commenced, creating new links between Edinburgh and Bathgate, and Edinburgh Park station and Whitburn.

On 17 November 2019 service X38 was launched connecting Edinburgh to Linlithgow (now withdrawn), rivalling First Scotland East's service with the same number. This was followed by the X18 on 2 December 2018, serving Edinburgh and Armadale via Broxburn and Bathgate, and night service N28, replicating the existing X27 route as far as Deans South.

In May 2023 a new N18 night service was introduced, with one journey per night between Edinburgh and Bathgate via Broxburn, and with an additional journey per night on weekends.

=== Edinburgh Bus Tours ===
==== History of tour operations ====
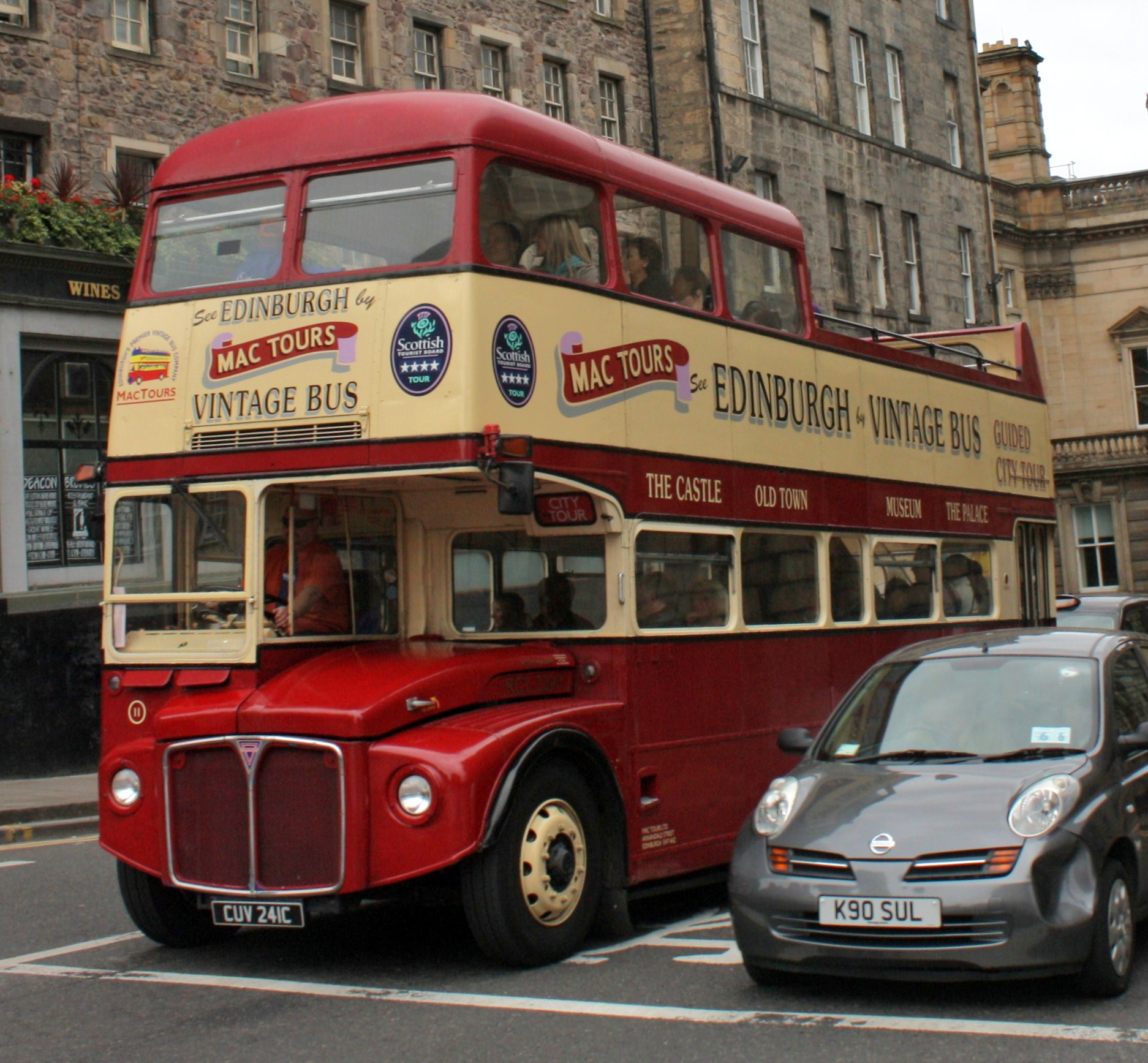
MacTours open-top AEC Routemaster in August 2010

Lothian Buses have operated city tours using white liveried coaches. Later, Leyland Atlanteans were employed in this same livery, with blinds for City Tour. These wore an updated version of the white livery with blue detailing after a short period. An Edinburgh Classic Tour was set up in 1989 using open top Leyland Atlanteans, and later Leyland Olympians, which competed with Guide Friday. This was as a result of Guide Friday introducing competition on the city centre to Airport route. The buses wore a blue and white livery, each carrying a name e.g. Scottish Star, Lothian Star and Highland Star. Lothian Buses also operated open top tours in Oxford (in conjunction with local operator Tappins) and Cambridge under the Classic Tour identity.

From 2002 to 2016, a sightseeing operation named MacTours operated across Edinburgh between March and October, using a fleet of 12 AEC Routemaster buses painted in a dark red and cream livery. These were withdrawn in November 2016 due to changing environmental standards and disabled access requirements.

On 2 April 2022, Edinburgh Bus Tours launched Cobbles' Tour, named after the Edinburgh Tour's Scottish Terrier mascot 'Cobbles'. The service, which operates using five Volvo B5TL Wright Gemini 3s cascaded from the other open-top operations, serves the Grassmarket, Edinburgh Castle and the Royal Mile at a fifteen-minute frequency. This tour did not return in 2023, with buses being moved onto City Sightseeing and Edinburgh Tour tours allowing for summer frequency increases.

==== Current operations ====
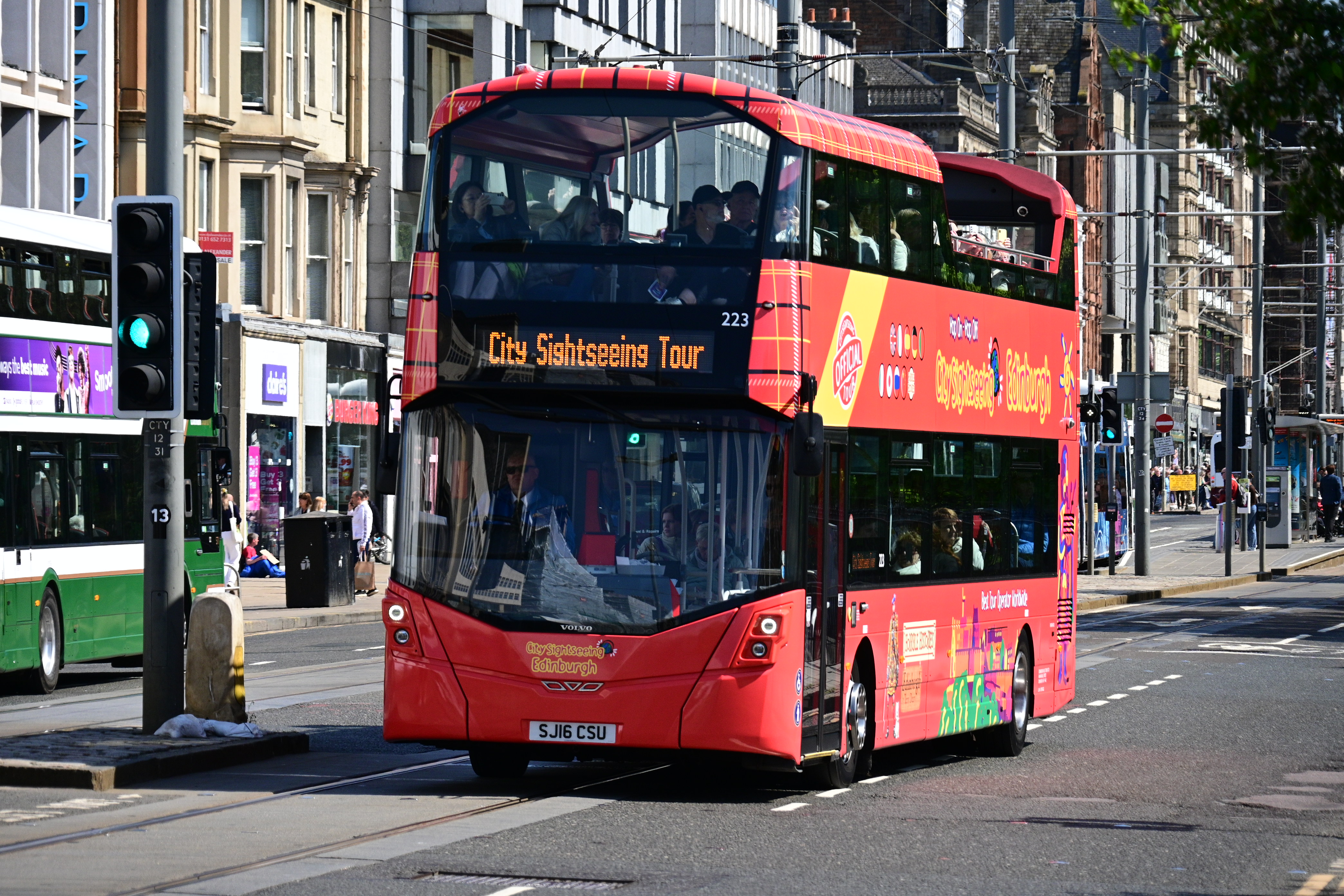
A City Sightseeing Edinburgh Volvo B5TL with Wright Gemini 3 open-top bodywork on Princes Street

Today's open-top services are operated by Edinburgh Bus Tours under three distinct brands: City Sightseeing, the Edinburgh Tour and the Regal Tour. The City Sightseeing tour is operated as a franchise of the City Sightseeing brand.

City Sightseeing and the Edinburgh Tour visit the Old Town, New Town, Calton Hill, Holyrood Palace and Edinburgh Castle, albeit on slightly differing routes. The Regal Tour operates a long loop from Holyrood and New Town, via the Royal Botanic Garden, to the coast at Ocean Terminal, the site of the former Royal Yacht Britannia.

All sightseeing services are operated with 30 purpose-built Wright Gemini 3 bodied Volvo B5TL open top buses, which replaced Plaxton President bodied Dennis Tridents in 2016. For the City Sightseeing tours, the livery is red, for Edinburgh Tours the livery green, and Regal Tours use blue coloured vehicles.

Between 4 and 26 August 2018, Edinburgh Bus Tours operated the '20 Days Of Summer' bus tour, serving destinations around Edinburgh such as the Braid Hills, Colinton, Fettes College, the Ocean Terminal and Portobello using a fleet of refurbished former Mac Tours AEC Routemasters.

Edinburgh Bus Tours reported visitor numbers of 610,000 in 2023, an 18% increase on 2022, making the service the 8th most visited attraction in Edinburgh that year.

=== Lothian Motorcoaches ===
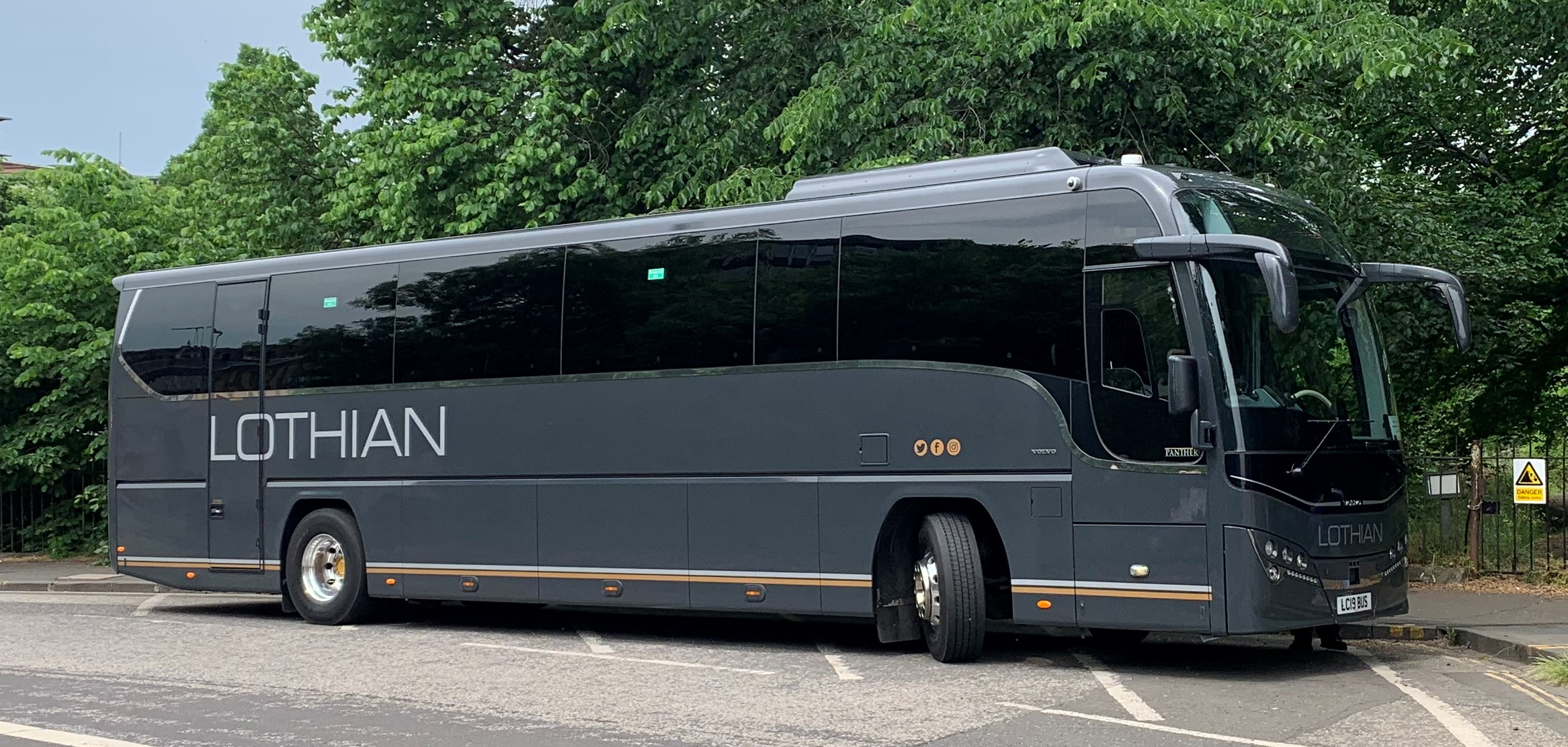
Lothian Motorcoaches Plaxton Panther bodied Volvo B11R in June 2023

In June 2018, Lothian returned to the coach charter market after a 19-year absence through a new subsidiary named Lothian Motorcoaches that commenced with five Plaxton Panther bodied Volvo B11Rs and three-second-hand Van Hool bodied Volvo B12MTs. A new depot is being built for Lothian Country and Lothian Motorcoaches in the Newbridge area. The design of the livery used by Lothian Motorcoaches is not related to the other brands of the group, being entirely dark grey with silver lettering.

=== Eve Coaches ===
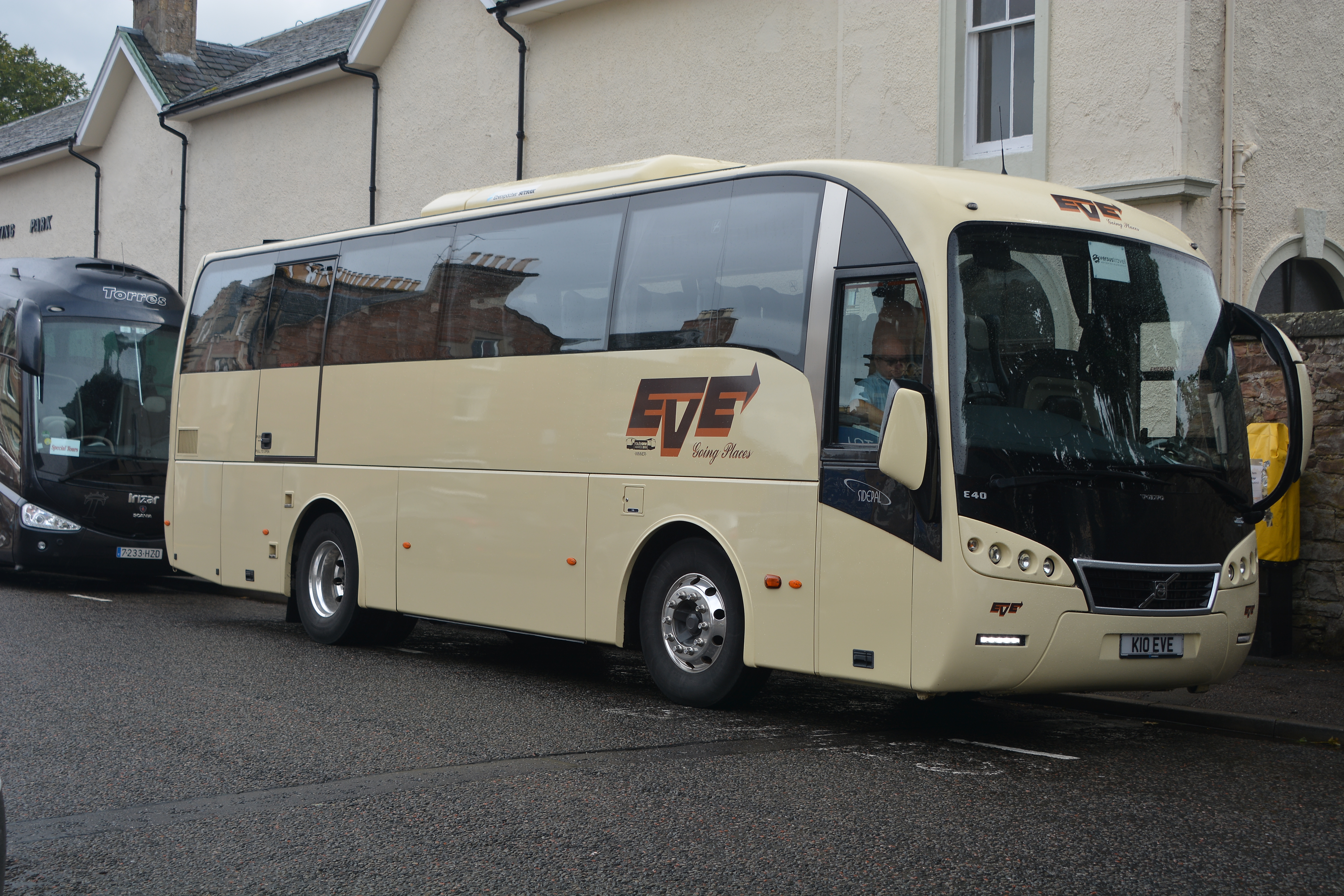
Eve Coaches coach in Inverness

In February 2024, Lothian announced that it had purchased East Lothian coach operator, Eve Coaches. The company said that it intended to continue operating the existing services under the Eve Coaches brand, these including local bus services, private hire services and school work. Lothian also said that it would expand its own coach and tours offering in East Lothian.

=== Night buses ===
Lothian Buses also operates a nightbus network. Ridership increased when the routes were re-numbered and re-routed to match daytime routes and increased in frequency. The operation of night buses provides a continuous 24-hour bus service to some areas of the city. This ticket allows for unlimited travel all night on any night bus. From 5 November 2016, East Coast Buses introduced its own nightbus service under the NightHawk brand, to North Berwick and Dunbar. In December 2018, Lothian Country introduced the Nightbus N28 to Livingston.

== Infrastructure and operation ==
The previous company headquarters and engineering works in Shrub Hill, off Leith Walk, were sold in 1999 subject to planning permission, after being occupied by the company since 1871. After repeated delays, controversies and a public inquiry, in 2004, the site was sold to BL Developments for £12 million so that the site could be developed flats and houses.

The company as a whole operates three travel shops, and nine depots.

Lothian Buses serve four park & ride sites, located at Hermiston, Ingliston, Sheriffhall, and Wallyford (in East Lothian). They formerly served Straiton park & ride (in Midlothian) until the 7 September 2025. Lothian still serve stops on the nearby A701.

Lothian's double decker buses were unique in Scotland in displaying the destination at both the front and rear. In early mornings and late evenings, some services are curtailed to the city centre or to early termini, in the transition to the night bus service. In such cases, 'Part Route' is displayed in the intermediate display. Certain routes have all day short working termini, and minor diversions which are often indicated through the use of internal or external 'tram boards'. Since 2006, double-deck deliveries feature a "Route Diverted" intermediate display, used when road closures cause a service to be diverted from its normal route.

== Trams ==
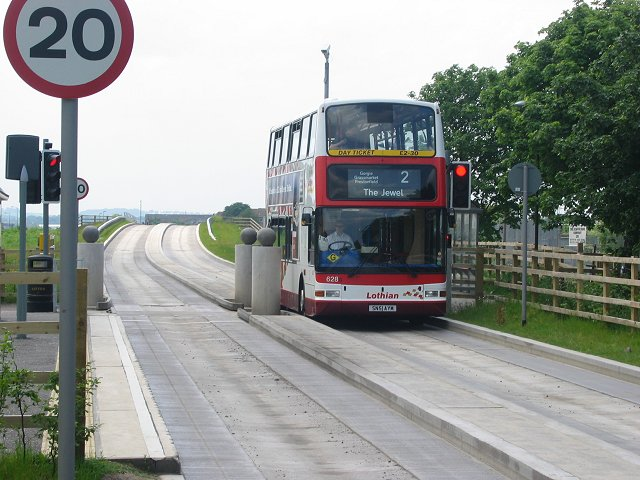
Plaxton President bodied Dennis Trident 2 traversing a former Fastlink guided busway. The route is now a tram line for Edinburgh Trams.

Lothian Buses' services have been integrated with Edinburgh Trams, since the trams commenced operation in 2014 – both are managed by one board, with Lothian Buses serving interchange with the trams at various locations. The now closed guided busway element of Fastlink formed part of phase 1a of the tram permanent way.

== Fleet ==
As of January 2025, the Lothian Buses fleet, incorporating East Coast Buses, Lothian Country, the Edinburgh Bus Tours, Lothian Motorcoaches and Eve Coaches, consists of approximately 730 buses and coaches.

=== Recent purchases ===
Lothian first introduced low emissions vehicles in the form of hybrid buses into service in 2011 with the purchase of 15 Alexander Dennis Enviro400Hs; these were subsequently retrofitted with diesel engines in 2018 due to issues with the hybrid batteries. These were supplemented with the arrival of the first ten Volvo 7900Hs in April 2013, initially allocated to route 1 from Clermiston to Easter Road. 20 more of the type were delivered in July 2014, followed by the delivery of another repeat order for 20 at the end of the year.

In 2017, Lothian Buses introduced six Wright StreetAir battery electric buses for route 1, replacing the Volvo 7900Hs. Another five were planned to be purchased in 2018 to fully electrify the route, but the order did not materialise. These were later complemented by four BYD Alexander Dennis Enviro400EVs in March 2021, purchased with funding by Scottish Power and the first battery electric double-decker buses to be purchased for Edinburgh. Following a trial of single- and double-deck demonstrator models during 2023, Lothian ordered 50 double-deck Volvo BZLs, which were delivered in two batches during September 2024 and February 2025. Another batch came along in August the same year. The newest batch of 40 Volvo BZLs arrived between September and November, bringing a total number of 99 of them to Lothian Buses. During June 2026, Lothian took delivery of 9 Wright GB Kite Electroliners for route 36.

Historically Lothian has purchased new buses for its regular services across Edinburgh, however in 2018, the company purchased 50 Wright Eclipse Gemini 2 bodied Volvo B9TLs from Tower Transit and Metroline. These were heavily refurbished, which included most of them gaining Northern Irish registration plates and their rear doors removed, before the first of the batch entered service in April.

In November 2018, the company announced the purchase of 42 13.4m Alexander Dennis Enviro400 XLB bodied Volvo B8L tri-axle buses, the first batch being delivered in early 2019, in time to celebrate the 100th anniversary of the founding of the company. The vehicles have 100 seats, with front and centre doors. Another batch of these buses, branded in a dark blue and gold livery for the 'Airlink' 100 express service, were delivered and put into service later in the summer, featuring luggage racks and audio-visual announcements. These tri-axle vehicles have been criticised for lacking space to fit pushchairs, as well as their length causing near collisions with motorists, pedestrians and cyclists.

=== Route branding ===
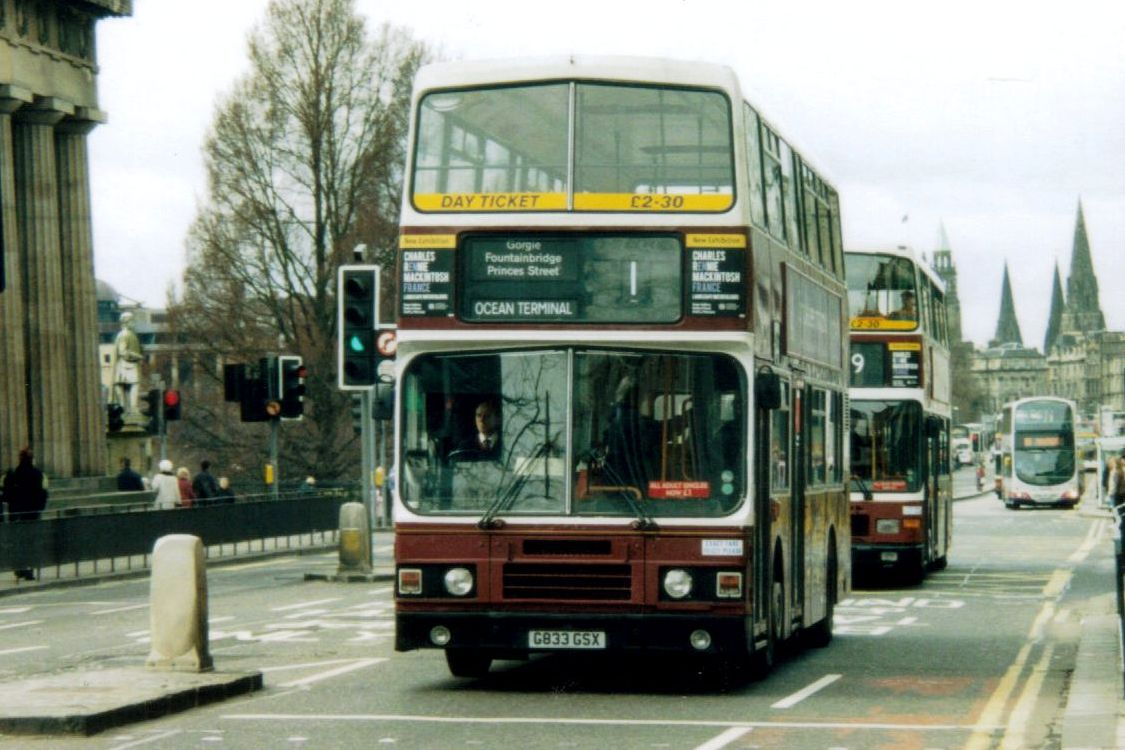
A now withdrawn Leyland Olympian in traditional madder and white livery on Princes Street in 2006

Route branding been used by Lothian since the introduction of low floor vehicles, although many liveries have now been phased out in favour of more uniform branding.

In 2010, the Harlequin livery used to identify low floor buses began to be phased out due to the company achieving full low-floor operation, with the company returning to their traditional madder and white livery.

In July 2011, Lothian Buses introduced 60 new double deck buses. These buses continued with the same madder red and white pattern on the outside of the bus but Lothian Buses changed the seats to a matching madder red colour. They also changed the entrance to the bus to a more wooden effect. Routes 4, 5, 19, 23 and 27 were the first buses to receive this branding.

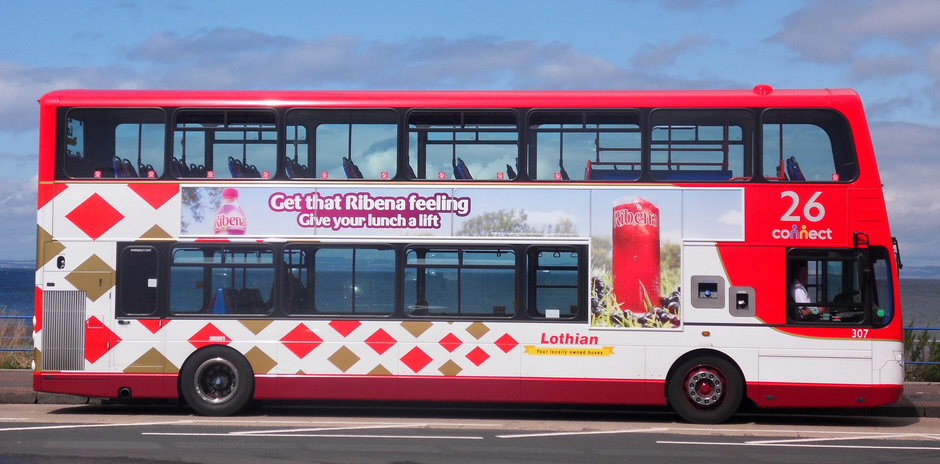
Wright Eclipse Gemini 2 bodied Volvo B9TL wearing former 26 Connect branding in 2009

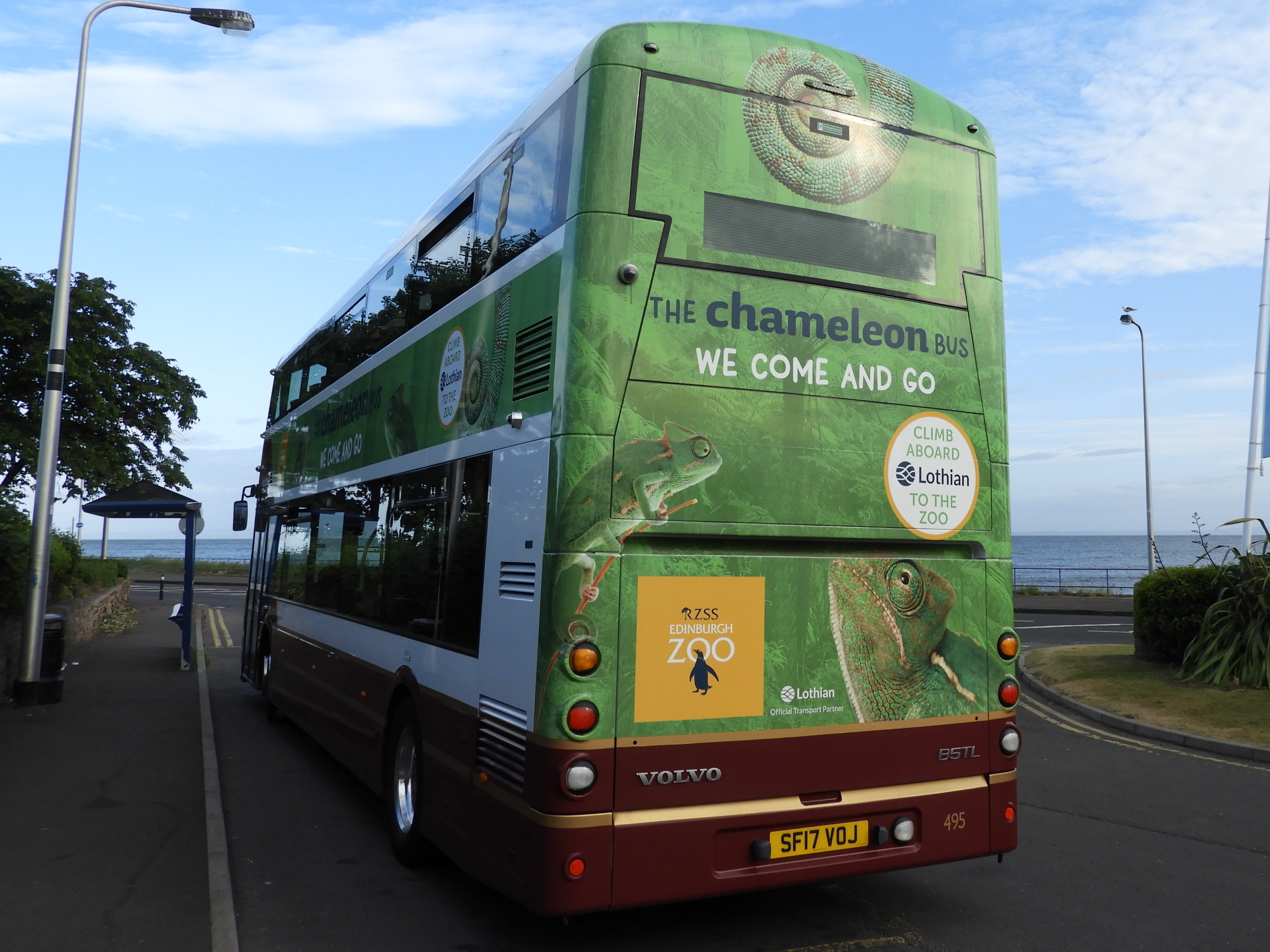
Rear of a Wright Gemini 3 wearing 'Chameleon Bus' branding for the Edinburgh Zoo in 2018

These brands were:

- Penicuik City Link (37, 47 and X47) between Edinburgh and Penicuik. This was superseded by a new branding, "The Pen-Y-Cog".
- Playing cards theme
  - Club Class – across the City and Midlothian (3/3A) with yellow uppers and roofline and a black club symbol. This was later superseded by "3-Connect" branding.
  - East to West Through the Heart of the City (26)
  - Ace of spades – cutting across the city and Midlothian (31) with orange uppers and roofline and a black spade symbol.
  - Service with a Sparkle (44) with black uppers and roofline and a yellow diamond symbol. This was superseded by a new branding, "The Mill Race".
  - The Best Deal (29), later The Stock Brig
  - Leader of the Pack (49), later The Queen of Scots
- Connect branding
  - 26 Connect: Clerwood, City Centre, Seton Sands / Tranent (This supersedes the earlier playing card theme.)
  - 22 Connect: Gyle + Edinburgh Park, Stenhouse, City Centre, Granton Harbour
  - 3 Connect (later replaced by The Lady Victoria branding)
- Morningside Maisie (5) with cream uppers and roofline and Maisie the Cat on both sides and at the rear.
- Zoom to the Zoo advertising (Route 26)

Five variations exist, on two vehicles each:

  - Glide to the Antarctic – Penguins
  - Trek to China – Pandas
  - Hop to the Amazon – Frogs
  - Cha Cha to Chile – Flamingos
  - Swing into Africa – Chimpanzees

In 2017, Lothian Buses' partnership with the Edinburgh Zoo was renewed, which saw 30 new buses receive livery designs featuring animals from the zoo including otters, penguins, koalas, red pandas and tigers. Colloquially known as "zoo buses", some of the animal designs appearing on these buses were decided by vote. A giraffe print design was added to the fleet in 2021 following the opening of the zoo's giraffe house.

=== Preserved vehicles ===
Many vehicles previously used by Lothian Buses and its predecessors have been preserved (or are awaiting preservation) by various groups and societies. Several of the vehicles regularly appear at events, rallies and running days around Scotland and the rest of the United Kingdom.

=== ScotZEB ===
Lothian Buses received £9,567,260 of funding to purchase 60 vehicles and 88 chargers in Phase 3 of the Scottish Zero Emission Bus Challenge fund out of £45 million overall.

Lothian purchased 20 Wrightbus StreetDeck Electroliners, alongside 40 Alexander Dennis Enviro400EVs with Volvo BZL chassis, both double-decker electric buses.

== Vehicle tracking ==
Lothian Buses are active members of the Bustracker system and are responsible for the funding of it as well as being partly responsible for the operation of it. It operates by tracking the movements of buses; computers then relay this information to the designated bus tracker signs throughout the city giving real-time and more up-to-date information on when buses are due to the passengers.

In December 2009, it was announced that, following the success of Bustracker, an application had been developed for the iPhone that is similar to the way Bustracker works. It allows users to see where their nearest bus stop is and when the next buses are due. Although not developed by Lothian Buses or The City of Edinburgh Council, the application has now won the backing of both organisations. My Bus Edinburgh is an application developed for the Android platform which is similar in functionality to the iPhone application. Like the iPhone application, this application is developed by an independent developer, backed by Lothian Buses and The City of Edinburgh Council, and is available free of charge.

In August 2010, the company introduced an early running alarm system for drivers, which is linked into the automatic vehicle tracking system, and sounds an alarm and displays warning messages if the bus is running early. This was as a result of the company being fined £10,500 by the Traffic Commissioner for Scotland, having been found to be running buses early. After a customer complaint, Vehicle and Operator Services Agency monitored services 4, 16, 27 and 45 in February 2010, and found that of 303 instances, 44 buses were running early, despite starting the route on time, while 20 were running late. The company's defence was that they had built in some running time to cope with the delays due to tram works, but in some places, these works had ended early. The Commissioner accepted this defence, and chose not to take action against the company's operating licence (which authorises a maximum of 700 vehicles). Instead the Commissioner imposed a fine set much lower than the legal maximum (calculated as £550 * 700 vehicles = £385,000)

The company also supplies data to the Transport for Edinburgh open data service, which supplies vehicle location data to sites such as bustimes.org.

== Routes ==
As of October 2026 Lothian and its subsidiaries operate the following routes:

| Number | Start | End | Operator |
| 1 | Clermiston | Seafield | Lothian |
| N1 | City Centre | Clerwood | Lothian |
| 2 | Hermiston Gait | The Jewel | Lothian |
| 3 | Clovenstone | Mayfield | Lothian |
| N3 | Haymarket | Gorebridge | Lothian |
| 4 | Hillend | Queen Margaret Uni | Lothian |
| X4 | Tranent | Edinburgh | East Coast Buses |
| 5 | Hunter’s Tryst | The Jewel | Lothian |
| X5 | North Berwick | Edinburgh | East Coast Buses |
| X6 | Haddington | Western General | East Coast Buses |
| 7 | Newhaven | Royal Infirmary | Lothian |
| X7 | Dunbar | Edinburgh | East Coast Buses |
| 8 | Muirhouse | Royal Infirmary | Lothian |
| 9 | Muirhouse | King's Buildings | Lothian |
| 10 | Ocean Terminal | Bonaly | Lothian |
| 11 | Western Harbour | Hyvot's Bank | Lothian |
| N11 | City Centre | Hyvot's Bank | Lothian |
| 12 | Gyle Centre | Portobello | Lothian |
| 14 | Muirhouse | Greendykes | Lothian |
| N14 | Muirhouse | Surgeons' Hall | Lothian |
| 15 | King's Road | Easter Bush | Lothian |
| 16 | Silverknowes | Torphin | Lothian |
| 17 | Airport | Ocean Terminal | Lothian |
| 18 | Airport | Fort Kinnaird | Lothian |
| X18 | Whitburn | Edinburgh | Lothian Country |
| N18 | Edinburgh | Bathgate | Lothian Country |
| 19 | Granton | Eastfield | Lothian |
| X19 | Livingston | Edinburgh | Lothian Country |
| 20 | The Calders | Chesser | Lothian |
| 21 | Gyle Centre or Clovenstone | Royal Infirmary | Lothian |
| 22 | Gyle Centre | Granton Harbour | Lothian |
| 22A | Lothian Road | Gyle Centre | Lothian |
| 23 | Trinity | Greenbank | Lothian |
| 24 | West Granton | Royal Infirmary | Lothian |
| 25 | Heriot-Watt Uni | Restalrig | Lothian |
| N25 | City Centre | Heriot-Watt Uni | Lothian |
| 26 | Clerwood | Seton Sands | Lothian |
| X26 | Port Seton | Edinburgh | Lothian |
| N26 | Haymarket | Seton Sands | Lothian |
| 27 | Silverknowes | Hunter's Tryst | Lothian |
| X27 | Bathgate | Edinburgh | Lothian Country |
| 28 | Bellevue | Gilmerton | Lothian |
| X28 | Edinburgh | Bathgate | Lothian Country |
| N28 | Edinburgh | Bathgate | Lothian Country |
| 29 | Silverknowes | Gorebridge | Lothian |
| X29 | Gorebridge | Edinburgh | Lothian |
| 30 | Clovenstone | Queen Margaret Uni | Lothian |
| N30 | Westside Plaza | Musselburgh | Lothian |
| 31 | East Craigs | Bonnyrigg or Rosewell | Lothian |
| X31 | Rosewell | Edinburgh | Lothian |
| N31 | City Centre | Bonnyrigg | Lothian |
| 32 | West Granton | Balerno | Lothian |
| 33 | Westburn | Millerhill | Lothian |
| X33 | Loanhead | Edinburgh | Lothian |
| 34 | Heriot-Watt Uni | Ocean Terminal | Lothian |
| 35 | Heriot-Watt Uni | Ocean Terminal | Lothian |
| N35 | Ocean Terminal | Heriot-Watt Uni | Lothian |
| 36 | Gyle Centre | Ocean Terminal | Lothian |
| 37 | Silverknowes | Penicuik Deanburn or Easter Bush | Lothian |
| 37A | Penicuik Deanburn | Royal Infirmary | Lothian |
| X37 | Penicuik | Edinburgh | Lothian |
| N37 | Silverknowes | Penicuik | Lothian |
| 38 | West Granton | Royal Infirmary | Lothian |
| 39 | Polton | Dalkeith Campus | Lothian |
| 39A | Rosewell | Royal Infirmary | Lothian |
| X40 | Royal Infirmary | St John's Hospital | Lothian Country |
| 43 | Queensferry | Edinburgh | Lothian County |
| N43 | Deans | Edinburgh | Lothian County |
| 44 | Balerno | Wallyford or Whitecraig | Lothian |
| N44 | City Centre | Balerno | Lothian |
| 45 | Heriot-Watt Uni | King's Road | Lothian |
| 47 | Cammo | Penicuik Ladywood | Lothian |
| 47B | Cammo | Penicuik Ladywood | Lothian |
| X47 | East Craigs | Frederick Street | Lothian |
| 48 | Gorebridge | Musselburgh | Lothian |
| 49 | Royal Infirmary | Fort Kinnaird | Lothian |
| 70 | Gyle Centre | Hermiston P&R | Lothian Country |
| 71 | Gyle Centre | Queensferry | Lothian Country |
| 72 | Fauldhouse | Broxburn | Lothian Country |
| 73 | Armadale | Livingston | Lothian Country |
| 74 | Fauldhouse | Blackburn | Lothian Country |
| 100 | Airport | City Centre | Airlink (Lothian) |
| 106 | Haddington | Western General | East Coast Buses |
| 107 | Musselburgh | Dunbar | East Coast Buses |
| N107 | Edinburgh | Dunbar | East Coast Buses |
| 113 | Pencaitland | Edinburgh | East Coast Buses |
| N113 | Edinburgh | Ormiston | East Coast Buses |
| 120 | North Berwick | Dunbar | East Coast Buses |
| 121 | North Berwick | Haddington | East Coast Buses |
| 123 | Haddington/Gifford Circle | | East Coast Buses |
| 124 | North Berwick | Edinburgh | East Coast Buses |
| N124 | Edinburgh | North Berwick | East Coast Buses |
| 125 | Musselburgh | North Berwick HS | East Coast Buses |
| 126 | Aberlady | North Berwick HS | East Coast Buses |
| 127 | Longniddry | North Berwick HS | East Coast Buses |
| 128 | Longniddry | Preston Lodge HS | East Coast Buses |
| 140 | Musselburgh | Penicuik | East Coast Buses |
| 141 | Musselburgh | Penicuik | East Coast Buses |
| Tram | Airport | Newhaven | Edinburgh Trams |
| Uni | University of Edinburgh Shuttle | | Lothian |

== In media ==
Lothian Buses' Marine depot was used as a location for the CBeebies children's programme Me Too! under the name of Riversea Buses. The company's staff also feature in the programme, aired between 2006 and 2008. Of Lothian Buses' participation in the series, the company's then chief executive officer Neil Renilson said "It's a good opportunity to keep public transport in the eye of the next generation of customers."
