= Wallyford =

Town in East Lothian, Scotland

Coordinates: 55.9381°N 3.0117°W

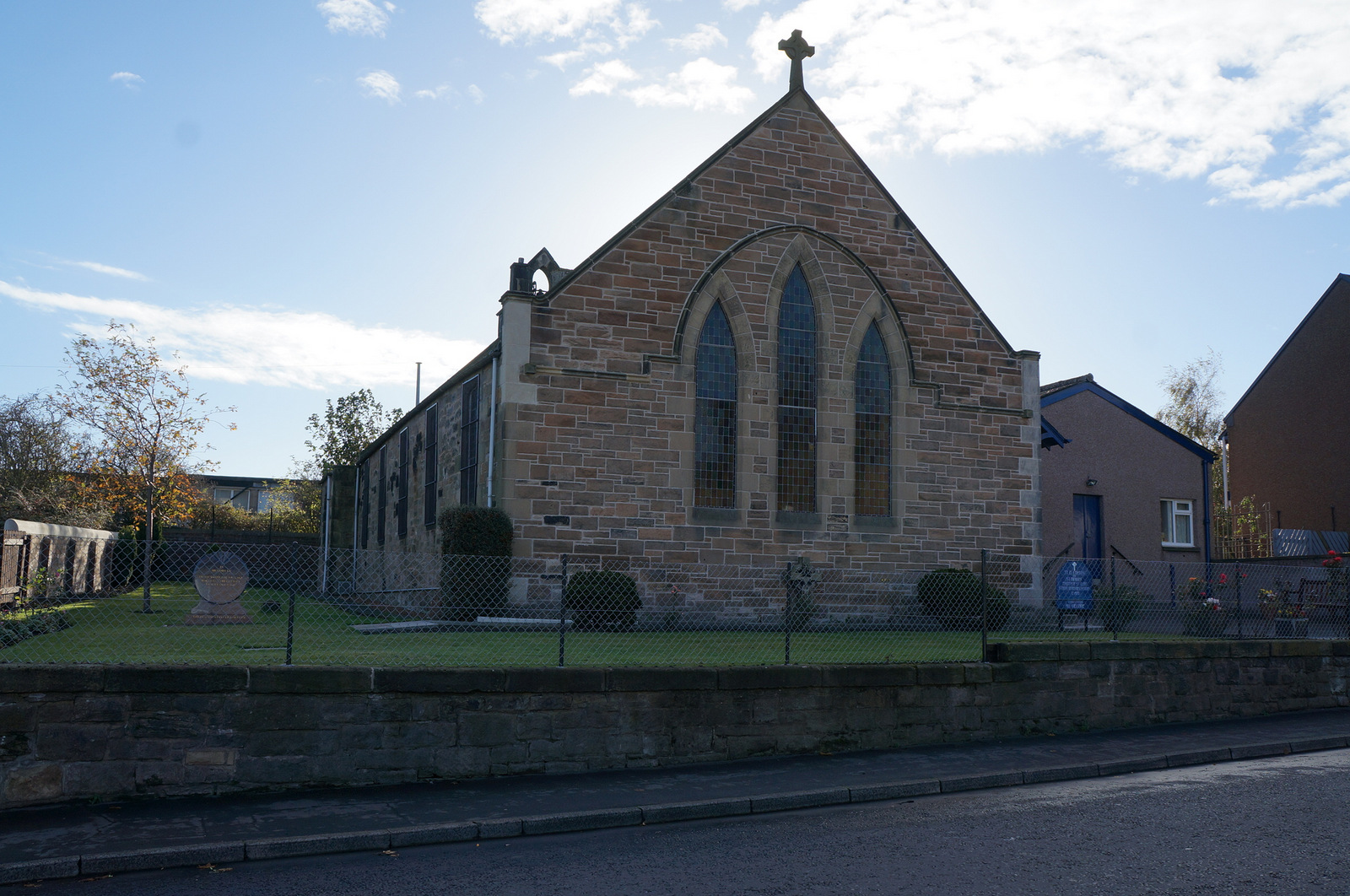
- St Clements and St Ninians Church, Wallyford

- Location within East Lothian
- Population: 3,370 (2020)
- OS grid reference: NT368722
- Civil parish: Inveresk
- Council area: East Lothian
- Lieutenancy area: East Lothian
- Country: Scotland
- Sovereign state: United Kingdom
- Post town: MUSSELBURGH
- Postcode district: EH21
- Dialling code: 0131
- Police: Scotland
- Fire: Scottish
- Ambulance: Scottish
- UK Parliament: Lothian East
- Scottish Parliament: Edinburgh Eastern, Musselburgh and Tranent

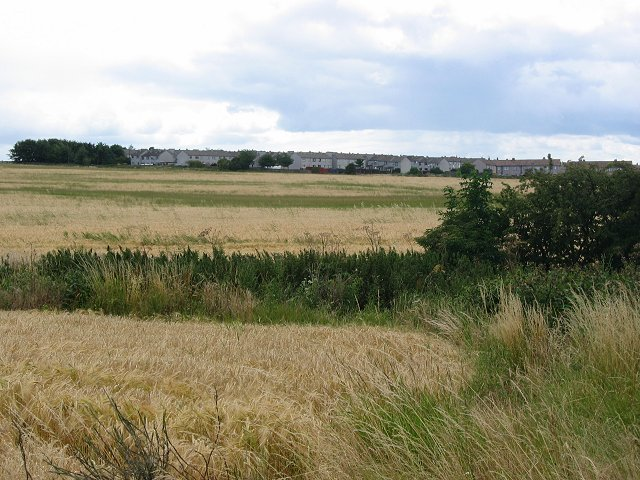
Looking south-west across barley fields to Wallyford

Wallyford is a town near Musselburgh and approximately seven miles (11 km) east of Edinburgh in East Lothian, Scotland.

== History ==
The village was initially populated by coal miners and later grew as an overspill/commuter town for workers in Musselburgh and Edinburgh. A tribute to the miners can be found marked on a stone through the main road (Salters Road) of the village. A coal mine at Wallyford was worked for the profit of Mary, Queen of Scots in 1563 and also supplied coal for her own fire at Holyrood Palace.

The town is overlooked by the restored Fa'side Castle which was destroyed by the English after the Battle of Pinkie in 1546.

The town was formerly the site of Wallyford Greyhound Stadium, which closed in 1992. Plans to build a second greyhound stadium in Wallyford were eventually abandoned in 2021 after two decades of planning.

In 2016, construction began to regenerate the village. A new, replacement Primary School was completed in February 2019 and was followed by the new Wallyford Learning Campus in November 2024. A new village high street/centre will be created alongside a legible hierarchy of roads and footpaths, maximising connections throughout but in particular to the Village Centre and Community Woodland.

Like much of East Lothian, Wallyford has undergone significant population growth in recent years, with planning permission granted for over 2,000 new homes in the area, as of 2024. These new developments, in combination with the opening of new Primary and Secondary school facilities and proximity to Edinburgh, have seen Wallyford transformed from a village into a growing town.

== Transport ==
Wallyford has a railway station with a park and ride facility, on the Edinburgh to North Berwick railway line, operated by ScotRail. Services operate on an average of once per hour (up to twice hourly at peak times) in either direction to Edinburgh Waverley and North Berwick, with five trains per day also operating to Dunbar.

The northern end of the A1 road passes by the town, offering easy access into Edinburgh and the Edinburgh City Bypass.

The town is also well served by buses. Lothian Buses route 44 has a terminus in Wallyford, offering service to Edinburgh and Balerno via Musselburgh. In addition, night bus route N26 stops in nearby Pinkie. East Coast Buses also offers both express and stopping services to Edinburgh, whilst Prentice Coaches has a number of routes around East Lothian which stop in Wallyford.

== Landmarks ==
Musselburgh Racecourse is located nearby, with a free courtesy bus operating from Wallyford to the racecourse on racedays. Fort Kinnaird retail park is easily accessible from the town.

It has a primary/nursery school, secondary school, playgroup, community centre, churches, library, post office, a CrossFit Gym and a Miners' social club.

As of 2025, plans have been approved to build 10 new mixed-use retail units in the town.

== Notable people ==
Sir William Binning of Wallyford (1627–1711) Lord Provost of Edinburgh 1675–1677

Nancy Blaik, MBE (1936 - 2025) born Nancy Geekie in Wallyford on 30 May 1936, was a blind charity volunteer who founded the first children's hospice in Scotland.

Victorian writer Margaret Oliphant was born in Wallyford on 4 April 1828. Among her best-known works were Katie Stewart, The Carlingford Chronicles and Tales of the Seen and Unseen. She died in Wimbledon on 25 June 1897 and was buried in Eton Cemetery near Windsor.

Willie Park, Sr., the first and four-time winner of the Open Championship in golf, was born in Wallyford on 30 June 1833 and died on 25 July 1903.

Former footballer and football manager Jock Wallace, Jr. was born in Wallyford on 6 September 1935. He went on to have a successful career as manager of Rangers.

Gordon Hunter, professional footballer, played over three hundred games for Hibernian between 1983 and 1997. In his later career, played for a number of other Scottish clubs, plus a spell in Australia with Canberra Cosmos.

== See also ==
- List of places in East Lothian
