= William Binning =

Scottish landowner

Sir William Binning (or Binny) of Wallyford (1637–1711) was a 17th-century Scottish landowner who served as Lord Provost of Edinburgh from 1675 to 1677.

== Life ==
He was born at Ford in Midlothian on 11 March 1637 the son of James Binning of Carlowrie Haugh (b.1580), servitor to the lairds of Cranstoun Riddel in Midlothian, including James Makgill, 1st Viscount of Oxfuird. His mother, Euphemia Baillie (b.1610), daughter of Alexander Baillie, was James's second wife, and William was their only child.

He was descended from William Bunnock who famously retook Linlithgow Peel from the English in 1313.

He was owner of Wallyford House (near Musselburgh) in (and perhaps prior to) 1672, when the house was remodelled.

He was succeeded as Lord Provost in 1677 by Francis Kinloch.

In 1693 he devised with Sir Thomas Kennedy of Kirkhill (Provost of Edinburgh in 1685) for a major continental trade deal to the value of £15,000. This ultimately proved insufficient to cover costs and they extracted a further £1500 jointly from the Earl of Linlithgow and Earl of Breadalbane. However, this was deemed bribery and all parties were fined: Binning receiving a fine of £300.

In 1696 he asked for a reduction in the "tack" (tax) on the linen production which he oversaw in the building known as Paul's Work next to Trinity College Kirk.

He died on 7 January 1711.

Wallyford House was ruinous by the late 19th century and its remnants were demolished in 1948 to make way for a housing scheme.

== Family ==
Binning married Elizabeth Scott in 1662. They had eight children including Charles Binning of Pilmuir, an advocate and later Solicitor General to Scotland (1721 to 1725), Laurence Binning, Eupham Binning and Katherine Binning.

In 1701, aged 61, he married Mary Livingstone of Saltcoats.
