= Nancy Blaik =

Blind charity volunteer, founder of children's hospice in Scotland

- Born: Nancy Geekie; 30 May 1936; Wallyford, East Lothian
- Died: 10 May 2025 (aged 88)
- Known for: volunteering and fundraising for Children's Hospices across Scotland
- Spouse(s): Jack Blaik, OBE
- Children: Daniel Blaik, born 1977, died 2009
- Honours: MBE

Nancy Blaik, MBE (30 May 1936 – 10 May 2025), charity volunteer and founder of the first children's hospice in Scotland.

== Early life and career ==
Born Nancy Geekie in Wallyford, East Lothian, to parents Agnes and Angus Geekie, she had two siblings Christina and James, and grew up in Canonmills, Edinburgh where she was educated until the age of 15. Blaik was blind from childhood and after her schooling, she became an office assistant to the National Farmers Union, before working as an audio typist at the University of Edinburgh Medical Microbiology Department.

She was one of the people studied from birth in the University of Edinburgh research group Lothian Birth Cohorts −1936.

== Later life and family ==
She married Jack Blaik, a social worker, and in 1977 and had a son Daniel, who was diagnosed at the age of two with Leigh syndrome (subacute necrotizing encephalomyelopathy) a severe, and progressive, neurological disorder and who was only able to move his eyes and mouth. Blaik became a full-time carer for her son and started volunteering for charity Children Living with Inherited Metabolic Diseases (CLIMB). She and Jack obtained occasional respite care for Daniel at Martin House, children's hospice in Yorkshire, involving a lot of travel as there was no equivalent facility in Scotland.

== Volunteering and hospice foundation ==
Blaik and other parents of severely ill children who had been travelling to Martin House, started meeting in 1988 and decided to investigate the possibilities for a similar facility nearer to home. In September 1991, they hosted a meeting at the University of Edinburgh that led, within six months, to the founding of a Scottish charity on 5 February 1992, that became Children's Hospices Across Scotland (CHAS).

Blaik's volunteering led to her being named Disabled Scot of the Year 1991, and she actively helped raise the £10million needed to create Rachel House, Kinross the first children's hospice in Scotland, which opened in 1996 with public appeals in the Daily Record and Sunday Post newspapers and the MacRobert Trust contributing.

Daniel and the Blaiks were able to visit and benefit from Rachel House for thirteen years, until he died in 2009, aged 31.

Daniel and Nancy featured in the BBC television's Focal Point documentary "Nancy's Story" in 1998 and she took part in a BBC Radio 4 interview The Last Word with Valmik Thapar, Norma Meras Swenson and Stuart Farrimond, in which she was described as "the driving force behind the creation of Scotland's first children's hospice".

Blaik also volunteered and raised funds for RNIB and Guide Dogs for the Blind, as well as beginning Leith Home Start, which helps young parents needing support. She continued to engage with the Lothian Births Cohorts studies until she became ill with Lewy body dementia.

== Recognition ==
Nancy Blaik was awarded an MBE as a Founding Director of CHAS in 1997. Her husband Jack was recognised with an OBE in 2025, for his support for this work and services to disabled people.

Blaik died on 10 May 2025, aged 88. The then CHAS CEO, Rami Okasha said that

"Nancy was a true inspiration for many staff and families at CHAS. She had a clear ambition for what CHAS should offer young people, children and their families. She showed true commitment and spoke with real passion, holding true to her values over many years. “Nancy along with the other founders had the vision of what palliative care for babies and children could look like, along with strong determination, resilience and courage to turn their vision into a reality."

A Benefit Organ Recital in Nancy Blaik's honour was held on 17 October 2025, by Dr John Kitchen, Edinburgh City Organist at Broughton St. Mary's Church, Edinburgh as "both a celebration of music and a reminder of the power of community to carry forward her legacy of care for children, families, and neighbours in need.” and raised funds for CHAS and LifeCare, which supports older people with dementia.
