= Wallyford Greyhound Stadium =

Greyhound racing track in Wallyford, Scotland

Wallyford Greyhound Stadium Scarlett Park
- Location: Wallyford, Musselburgh, East Lothian, Scotland
- Coordinates: 55°56′17″N 3°01′04″W
- Opened: 1930's
- Closed: 1992

Wallyford Greyhound Stadium was a greyhound racing track in Wallyford, Musselburgh, East Lothian, Scotland.

The stadium also known as Scarlett Park was situated on the south side of the East Coast Main Line railway and opposite housing at Forthview which no longer exists.

The stadium hosted greyhound racing in the 1930s with evidence of racing before May 1937. The circuit consisted of race distances over 285, 470 and 660 yards. An 'Inside Sumner' hare was installed and the principal events run at the track were the East Lothian Sprint and East Lothian Derby. The stadium was independent (unaffiliated to a governing body) and council plans to demolish the stadium in 1986 resulted in closure for a few months before re-opening in 1987. Two years later planning permission was given for housing re-development which led to the eventual closure in 1992. The site today is housing named Scarlett Park after the track.

In 1998 East Lothian businessman Howard Wallace planned to build a new stadium to the west of the housing development not far from the original site of the old Scarlett Park. It would be called the Victory Lane stadium but problems and planning issues have resulted in a steel skeleton and an uncertain future. 2022 the steel skeleton was demolished
