= Waverley Bridge =

Road bridge in Edinburgh, Scotland

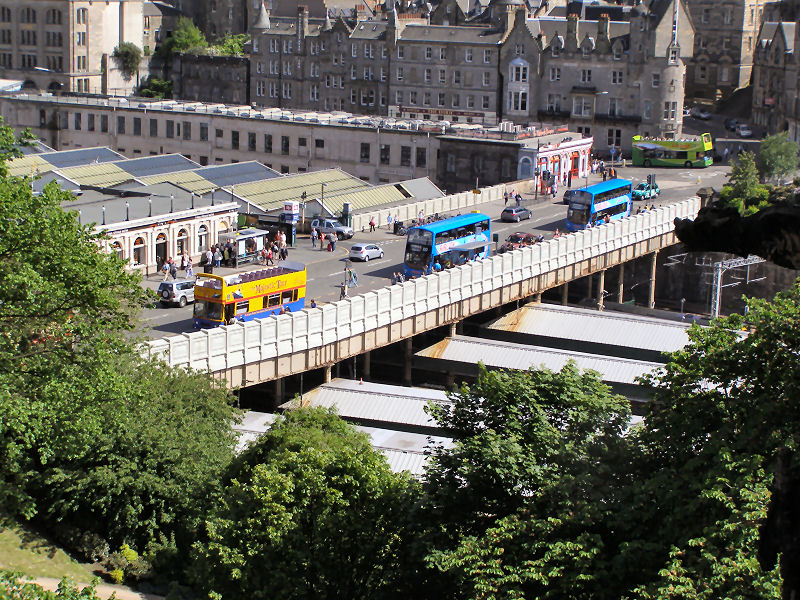
- Waverley Bridge viewed from the Scott Monument
- Coordinates: 55.9518°N 3.1918°W
- OS grid reference: NT 25791 73853
- Locale: Edinburgh

History
- Designer: Blyth and Westland
- Construction start: 1894
- Construction end: 1896

Listed Building – Category A
- Official name: Waverley Station (4 Waverley Bridge), Former Parcels Office (17 Waverley Bridge), And Waverley Bridge, (excluding Waverley Steps), Edinburgh
- Designated: 12 November 1991
- Reference no.: LB30270

Location
- Interactive map of Waverley Bridge

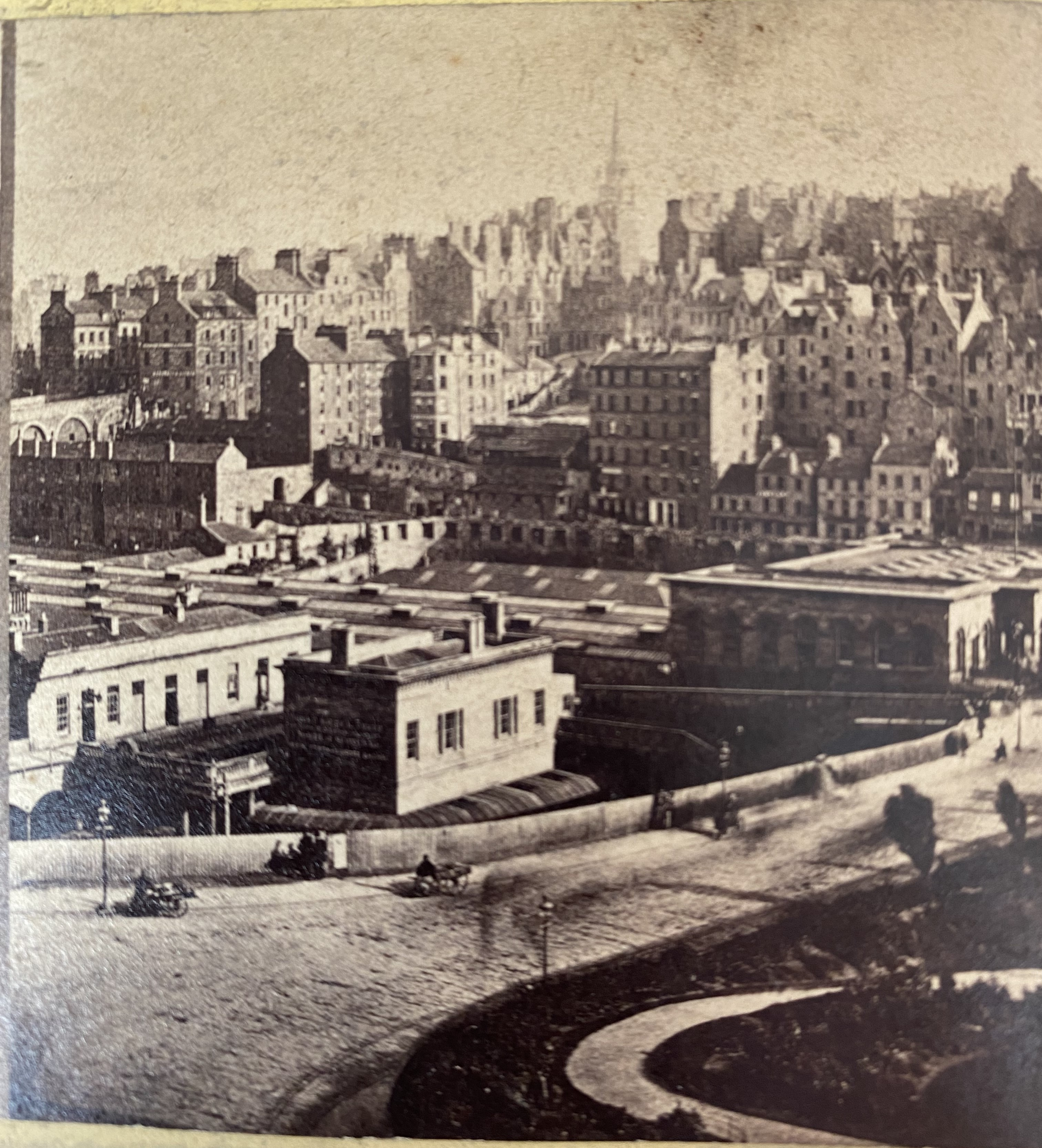
Waverley Bridge in the 19th century

Waverley Bridge is a road bridge in Edinburgh linking Market Street and Cockburn Street in the Old Town with Princes Street in the New Town. The bridge forms part of the roof of Edinburgh Waverley station and marks the eastern boundary of Princes Street Gardens. The current bridge was built between 1894 and 1896 by Blyth and Westland; it is Category A listed as part of the station.

== Location ==
Video of Waverley Bridge, Edinburgh (May 2018)

Situated at the east end of Princes Street Gardens, Waverley Bridge is one of three parallel roads crossing the former Nor Loch valley and linking Edinburgh's historic Old and New towns. To the west of Waverley Bridge lies The Mound, which links Princes Street in the New Town with the western end of Market Street in the Old Town. To the east, running above the Waverley Station roof, is North Bridge, which links the east end of Princes Street with the High Street and South Bridge.

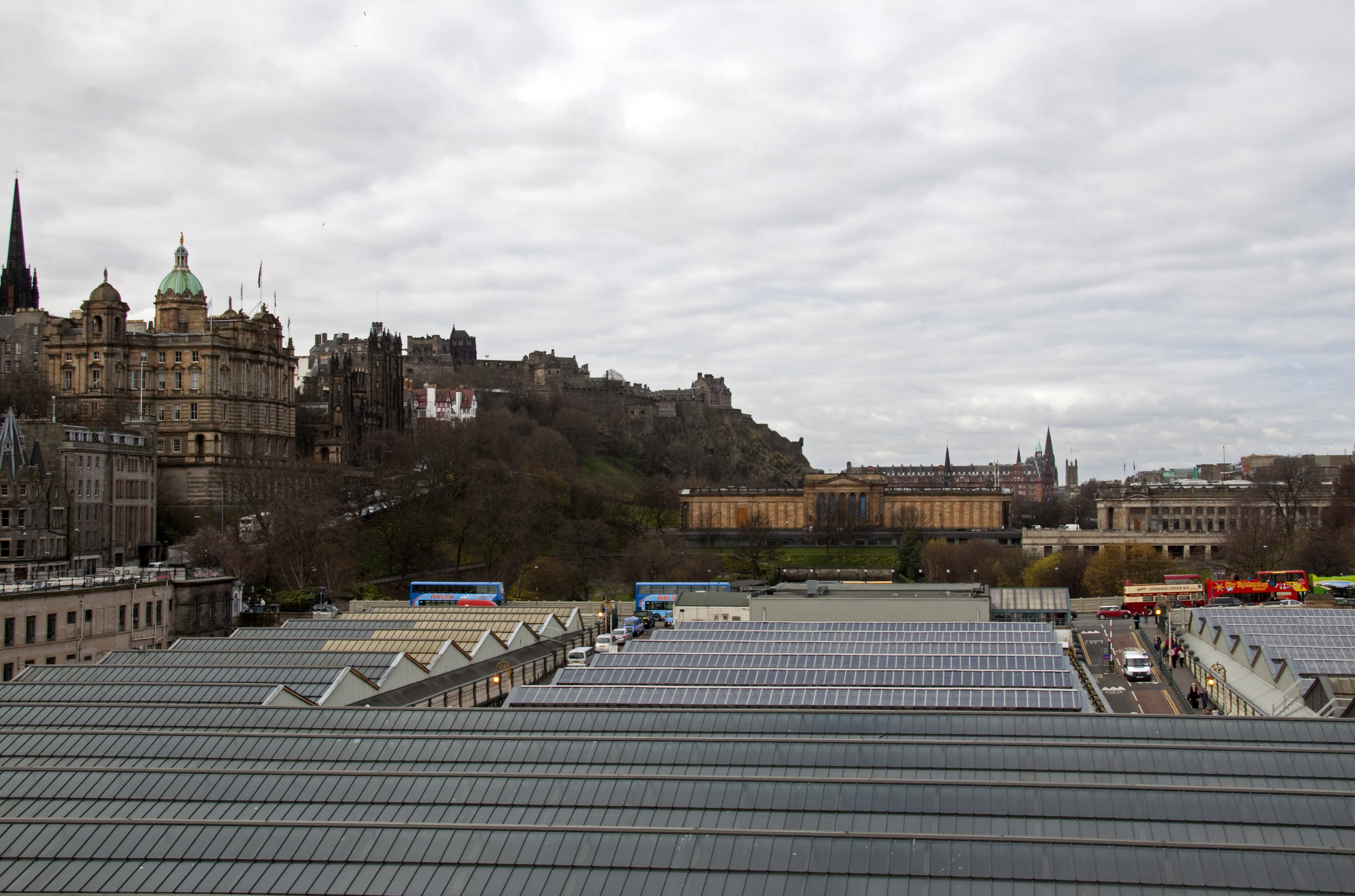
Waverley Station roof and Waverley Bridge. The two ramps lead from the bridge into the station.

Two carriageway ramps lead down from Waverley Bridge into the centre of the station. Since January 2014 car and taxi access to the station has been banned, with the ramps now largely dedicated to foot traffic and delivery access.

Halfway across the bridge, on the eastern side, is the station's former parcels office, also Category A listed as part of the station. The structure was converted into a restaurant in the 1980s and is now in operation as a public house. At the northeast corner of the bridge, at the junction with Princes Street, is the Waverley Market shopping centre. There is a Transport for Edinburgh Travelshop at the southeast corner with Market Street which was built for the earlier station of the late 1860s.

== Access ==
Vehicular access to Waverley Bridge is closed at the Princes Street end and bus services formerly on the bridge have been moved to other nearby locations.

== See also ==
- List of bridges in Scotland
