= Children's Hospices Across Scotland =

Scottish charity

Children's Hospices Across Scotland (CHAS)
- Formation: 1992
- Type: Registered charity
- Purpose: To provide palliative care to children and young people with life-shortening conditions
- Region served: Scotland
- Chief Executive: Rami Okasha
- Chairperson: Donald Macdonald
- Website: www.chas.org.uk

Children’s Hospices Across Scotland (CHAS) is a registered charity that provides the country's only hospice services for children and young people with life-shortening conditions, and services across children’s homes and hospitals. The first hospice was built thanks to the late editor-in chief of the Daily Record and Sunday Mail, Endell Laird, who launched a reader appeal which raised £4million. CHAS offers children’s hospice services, free of charge, to every child, young person and their families who needs and wants them.

== History ==
The organisation was formed as the Children's Hospice Association Scotland in February 1992 by a group of professionals and parents of children with life-shortening conditions, like Founding Director Nancy Blaik, MBE, who had travelled to England for hospice care. In 2018/19, CHAS supported 465 children with a life-shortening condition, and their siblings, parents and wider families. The care provided is multi-disciplinary, including from doctors, nurses, social workers, pharmacists, play specialists and others. CHAS also employs medical and nursing staff who work in hospitals alongside NHS doctors and nurses. In 2017 the organisation rebranded as Children’s Hospices Across Scotland.

== Rachel House, Kinross ==
Rachel House supports children and young people at end of life, and with short breaks. Work to build Rachel House, Scotland’s first children's hospice, started in December 1994. The land to build Rachel House in Kinross was donated by the Montgomery family who owned Kinross House which stands next to the hospice. Rachel House was named after Rachel, Lady MacRobert, in recognition of a £2 million donation by The MacRobert Trust. A 17-month fundraising appeal by the Daily Record newspaper raised £4 million towards the £10 million building cost and the full target was raised 13 months later. On 16 December 1994 celebrity supporter Phillip Schofield cut the first turf for Rachel House, assisted by children from Kinross Primary School. The hospice was opened in March 1996 by The Princess Royal.

In 2025, it was announced that the hospice would undergo a major redevelopment programme and planning permission had been granted for a £17m refurbishment. In 2026, the hospice moved to temporary premises in Kinglassie called Mina House.

== Robin House, Balloch ==
A fundraising appeal to build Scotland’s second hospice Robin House in Balloch near Loch Lomond began in 2001 with readers of the Sunday Post helping raise the £10 million needed to complete the project. Robin House was named after the European robin bird. In May 2003, the work began on the building with celebrity supporters Ewan McGregor and Sharleen Spiteri cutting the first turf with six-year-old Robyn Watterson who at the time used Rachel House. Robin House opened in August 2005 and supports children at end of life and with short breaks.

== CHAS at Home ==
In 2003 Rachel House at Home launched, offering a home care service to families in their own homes. The service originally operated out of The Highland Hospice in Inverness and moved to Ardross Terrace, Inverness in June 2009. In December 2008 Rachel House at Home became known as CHAS at Home. In December 2011 CHAS at Home launched an Aberdeen base at Rosemount Place, Aberdeen. Now CHAS at Home supports families across every local authority in Scotland, operating out of four hubs across Scotland. In 2018/19, CHAS at Home supported approximately 1200 visits across every local authority area in Scotland, providing both planned care and emergency end-of-life care. In 2018/19, a volunteer-led home support service was established to support families of children with life-shortening conditions and operates in east central Scotland.

== CHAS in hospitals ==
Most children who die from a life-shortening condition die in hospital. CHAS employs 3 Diana Children's Nurses. These are senior nursing roles who work across NHS areas and are based in Aberdeen, Edinburgh and Glasgow. In 2019, a new hospital-based CHAS team was established in the Royal Hospital for Children in Glasgow. This is the first children's palliative care team in Scotland. CHAS also jointly employs consultant-level posts to form teams with NHS Lothian, NHS Greater Glasgow and Clyde, and in NHS Ayrshire and Arran. A report on work in neonatal palliative care in Edinburgh was published in 2019.

== Research ==
CHAS published two pieces of research in 2007 undertaken with the Cancer Care Research Centre, University of Stirling. The first evaluated future research priorities for CHAS and the second identified the existing home care service.

In 2008, the Scottish Government published the report Living and dying well: a national action plan for palliative and end of life care in Scotland. CHAS staff members were integral to the consultation on children’s and teenage palliative care.

In June 2011 a new research project undertaken by the Cancer Care Research Centre at the University of Stirling was published investigating the experiences and symptoms of children and young people with life-shortening conditions.

In 2015, research was commissioned from the University of York to calculate the prevalence of children with life-shortening conditions in Scotland. This was the first single-nation study of such prevalence in the world and was published in a report called ChiSP (Children in Scotland Requiring Palliative Care). In 2019, and update of the report was commissioned by CHAS from NHS Scotland's Information Services Division. The CHISP2 study identified that the number of children with life-shortening conditions is growing and that the majority of children who die from life-shortening conditions are under 5. The total number of children and young people with life-shortening condition aged 0–21 is now at 16,000; many of these children are stable but about one third have had recent contact with a hospital team.

A further CHISP3 study was undertaken and published in 2020 which replicated the research and provided further analysis by condition and geography.

== Funding and governance ==
CHAS has been registered as a charity since 5 February 1992, currently registered as a charitable company with the Office of the Scottish Charity Regulator (OSCR), Scottish charity number SC 019724. The Chief Executive is Rami Okasha and the Chairperson is Peta Hay.

For the financial year 2021/22, CHAS spent £19.8m on its activities. CHAS employs 350 staff and has 788 volunteers supporting CHAS in care services, fundraising, retail and administration.

CHAS received £7m of its funding from NHS health boards and £700k from local authorities. The majority of its funding is provided by the general public through voluntary donations.

== Sites ==
In addition to Rachel House and Robin House, CHAS operates out of offices in Aberdeen, Edinburgh, Kinross and Stepps. CHAS has a small retail team based in Kinross who manage four charity shops. The head office is in Edinburgh, which is where the Chief Executive, Finance and Administration (IT, Finance and Facilities), Fundraising and Communications (Fundraising, Public Relations and Marketing) and Organisational Development (HR, Learning and Development and Volunteering) are based. CHAS also owns the Ardoch estate, which was gifted to the charity in 2021 and is run through a subsidiary company Ardoch Loch Lomond Ltd.
