= CAF Urbos 3 (Edinburgh) =

Type of the CAF Urbos 3 Tram operating on the Edinburgh Tram network

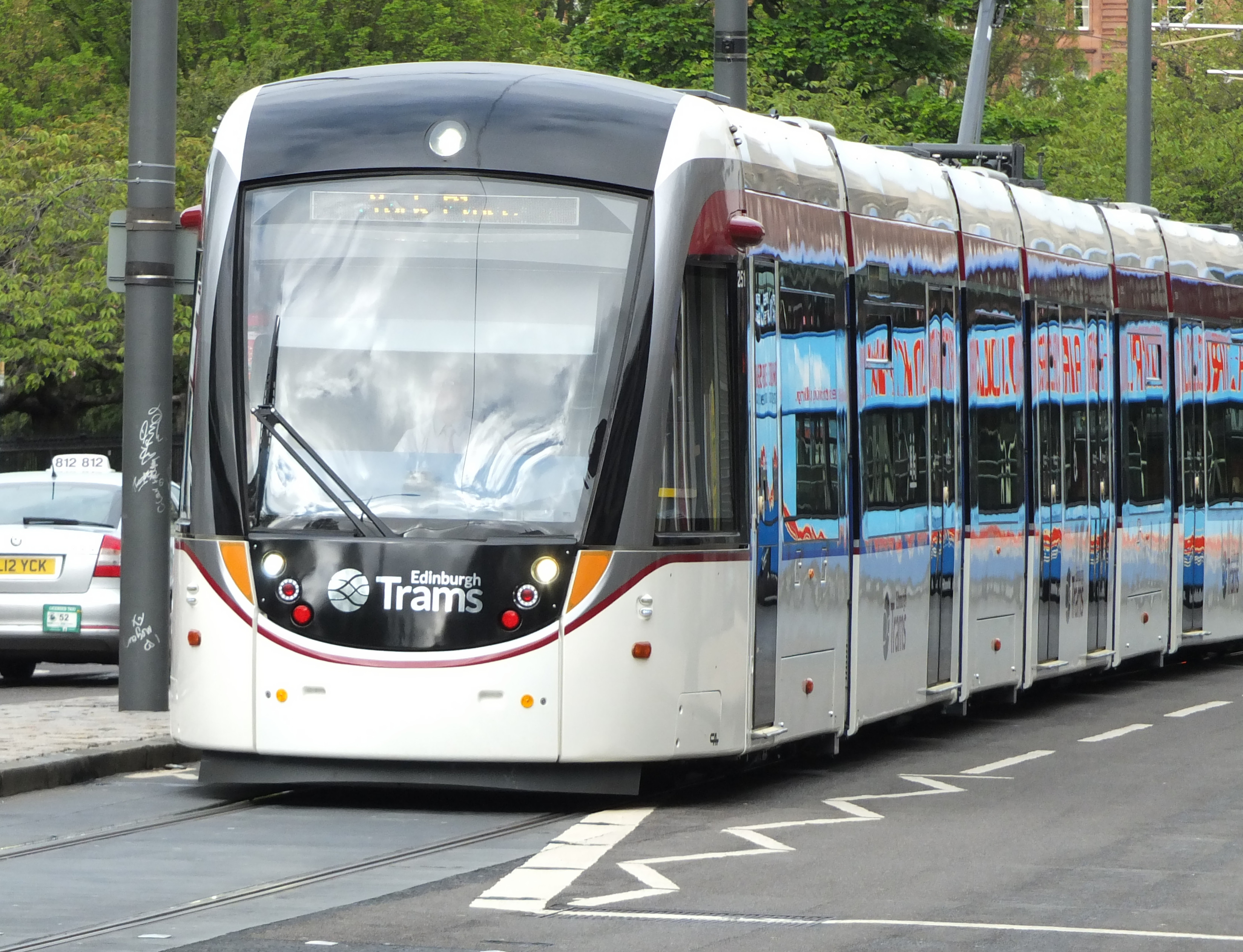
- A CAF Urbos 3 in Edinburgh, 2014

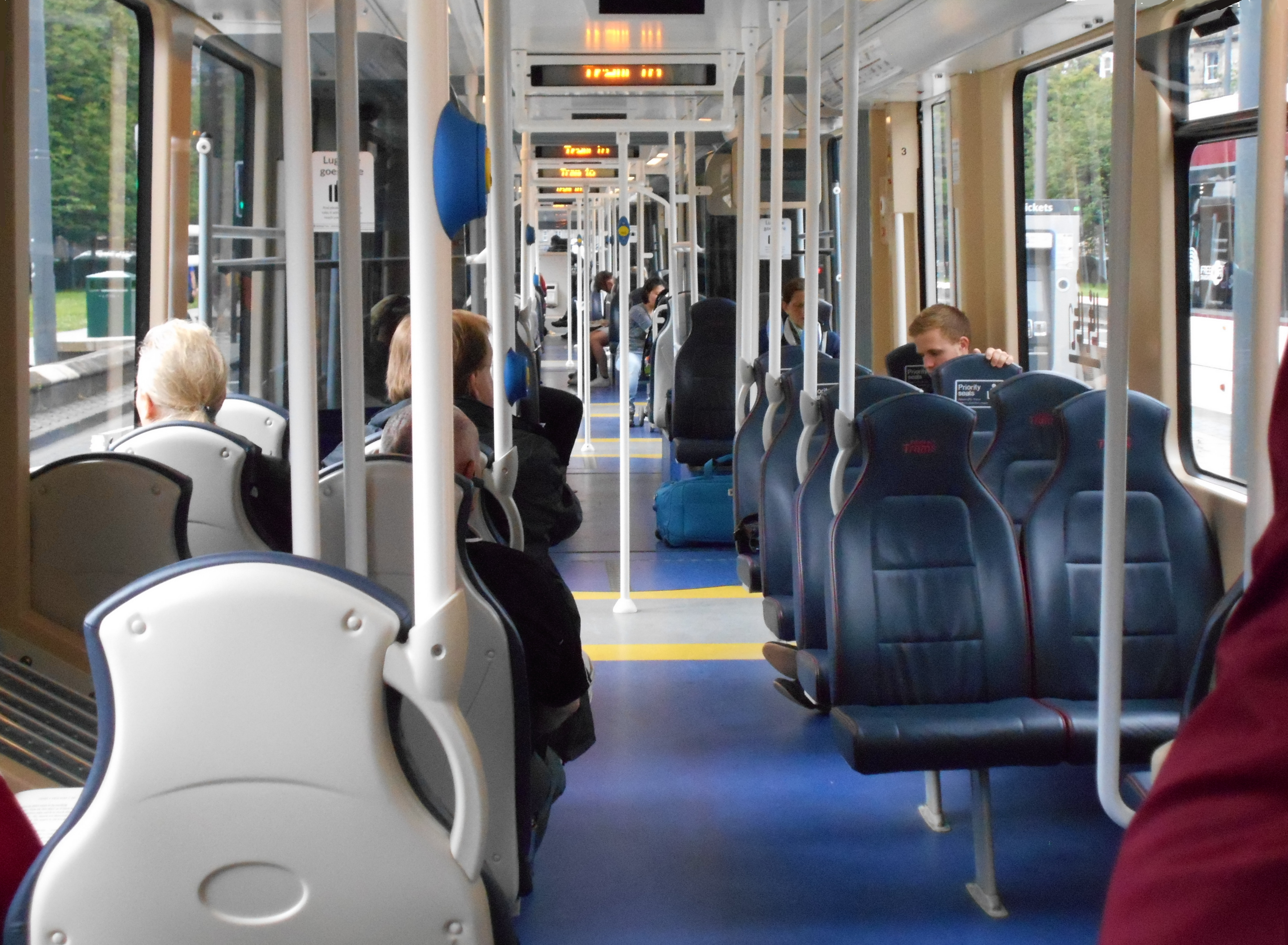
- Interior
- In service: May 2014 - Present
- Manufacturer: CAF
- Built at: Beasain, Spain
- Family name: Urbos 3
- Constructed: 2009–2011
- Number built: 27
- Number in service: 27
- Formation: 7 articulated cars per tram
- Fleet numbers: 251–277
- Capacity: 250 (78 seated, 170 standing, 2 wheelchairs)
- Operator: Transport for Edinburgh
- Depot: Gogar Depot

Specifications
- Car body construction: Stainless steel
- Car length: 42,856 mm (140 ft 7 in)
- Width: 2.65 m (8 ft 8 3/8 in)
- Height: 3.4 m (11 ft 1 7/8 in)
- Floor height: 350 mm (1 ft 1 3/4 in)
- Maximum speed: 70 km/h (43 mph)
- Weight: 56 tonnes (55 long tons; 62 short tons)
- Traction system: Kiepe Electric DPU 101 IGBT–VVVF
- Traction motors: 12 × ABB 4DDA3030 60 kW (80 hp) asynchronous 3-phase AC
- Power output: 720 kW (970 hp)
- Acceleration: 1.2 m/s^{2} (3.9 ft/s^{2})
- Electric systems: 750 V DC OHLE
- Current collection: Pantograph
- UIC classification: Bo′+0′+2′+0′+Bo′+0′+Bo′
- Track gauge: 1,435 mm (4 ft 8 1/2 in) standard gauge

Notes/references
- Sourced from except where noted

The Edinburgh Tram network operates a fleet of CAF Urbos 3 low-floor trams that were specially designed for use in the city. Twenty-seven were built in Beasain, Spain, between 2009 and 2011.

== History ==
The contract to build a fleet of 27 trams for the Phase 1a and Phase 1b tram lines was awarded to the Spanish rail equipment manufacturer CAF in November 2007 and is worth up to £40 million. The trams are built to meet the highly bespoke specifications issued by Transport Initiatives Edinburgh which precluded the use of an existing design.

CAF was selected by competitive tender from a list of four rail vehicle manufacturers, the others being Alstom, Bombardier, and Siemens.

A full size mockup of the front of the proposed tram was constructed and put on display on Princes Street for the public to view. The replica tram was moved to Constitution Street at the foot of Leith Walk in April 2009. There was also a tram front mockup put on display at the Gyle Shopping centre next to the bus stop.

The first finished tram was delivered on 26 April 2010 and went on public display on 28 April 2010 at the location of the previous mockup in Princes Street, before being moved to open storage in Broxburn in November 2010. The tram arrived far in advance of the completion of infrastructure (including its home depot), which has suffered serious delays and cost over-runs. The tramway opened on 31 May 2014, with a further extension opening in June 2023.

== Specifications ==
The Edinburgh trams are bi-directional, 42.8 metres (140 ft 5 in) long and built with 100% low-floor access to meet UK Rail Vehicle Access Regulations for disabled people. Passenger capacity is 250 – 78 seated, 170 standing and 2 wheelchair spaces – and the trams will be fitted with CCTV.

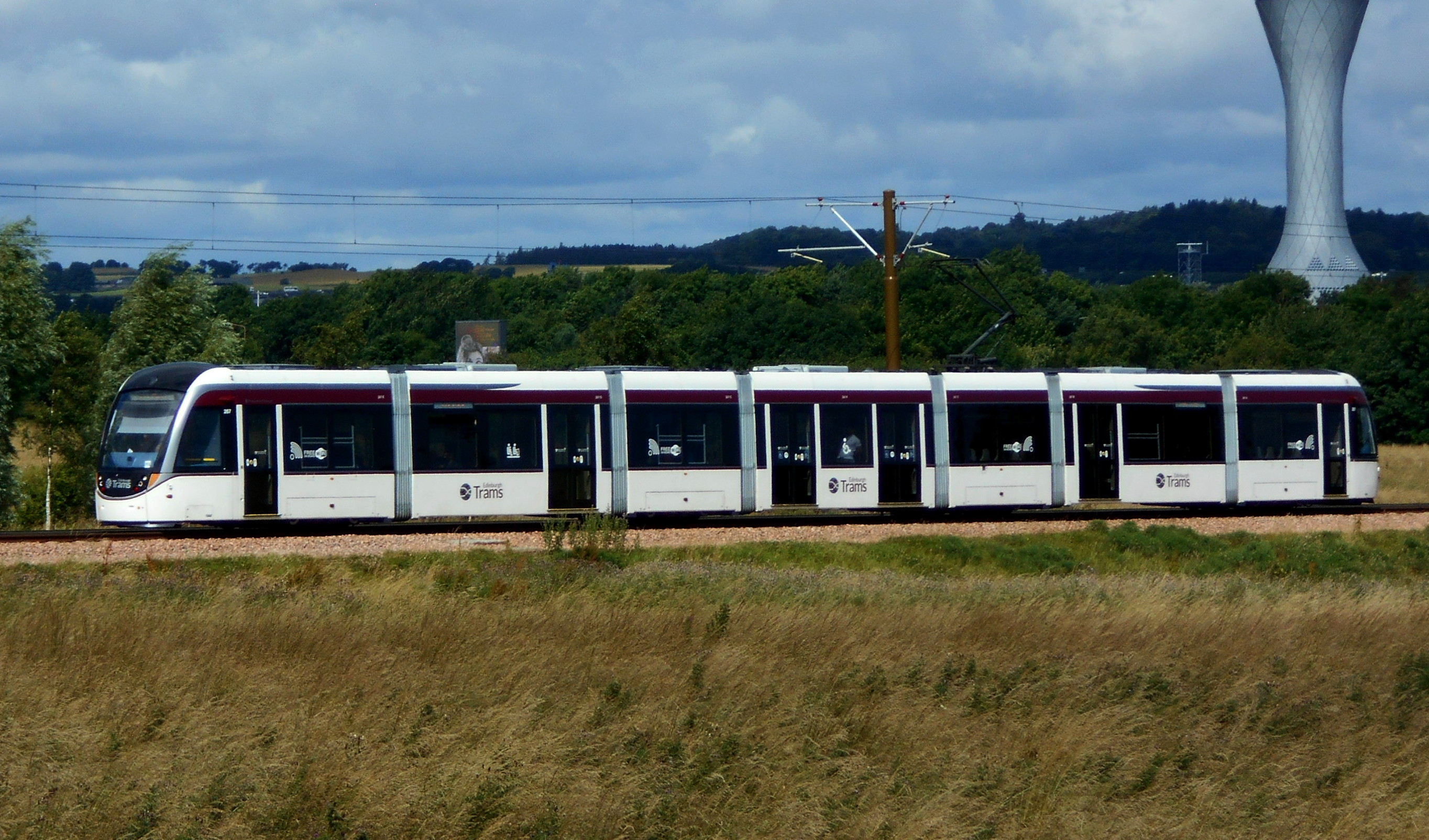
Sideways view of a tram

Several special requirements were specified for the tram vehicles: they have to cope with the steep slopes of Edinburgh streets, operate with low noise and offer a visual fit suitable for a World Heritage Site. The particular requirements were specified by Transport for Edinburgh with the aim of designing an advanced tram system tailored for the needs of Edinburgh. To achieve the low noise requirement a self lubricating system is used to avoid the squeal of wheels on track when turning tight curves around streetcorners at intersections and elsewhere.

== Livery ==
To create a visual continuity between the tram fleets and local bus services, Edinburgh trams have the same livery as that of Lothian Buses. The tram mockup shown in 2009 was decorated with the red and gold "harlequin" design that was introduced on Lothian Buses in the 2000s. Following the announcement of a rebranding of the bus fleet in April 2010, Lothian Buses reintroduced their traditional madder and white livery, and the tram livery was updated to a matching colour scheme.

As of recent years, Edinburgh Trams have introduced custom business liveries such as Capital Radio, OVO Energy, Edinburgh Rugby, Leith Distillery and Camera Obscura & World of Illusions.

== Testing ==
The first part of the tram line to be completed was a short section between Gogarburn and the depot at Gogar. Testing of new trams on this stretch of track started in December 2011 - the first time that a tram had moved under electric power in Edinburgh since 1956. The first daytime test run of a tram along the full route from Edinburgh Airport to York Place took place on 20 February 2014.

== In service ==
The fleet of 27 was ordered before the proposed network was curtailed. An attempt in 2011 to lease ten trams to Transport for London for use on Tramlink was unsuccessful and thus Edinburgh Trams took delivery of all 27 even though only half were required to operate the network at its peak, however since the extended line to Newhaven opened in 2023, this has increased significantly.
