= Edinburgh Trams =

Tramway in Edinburgh, Scotland

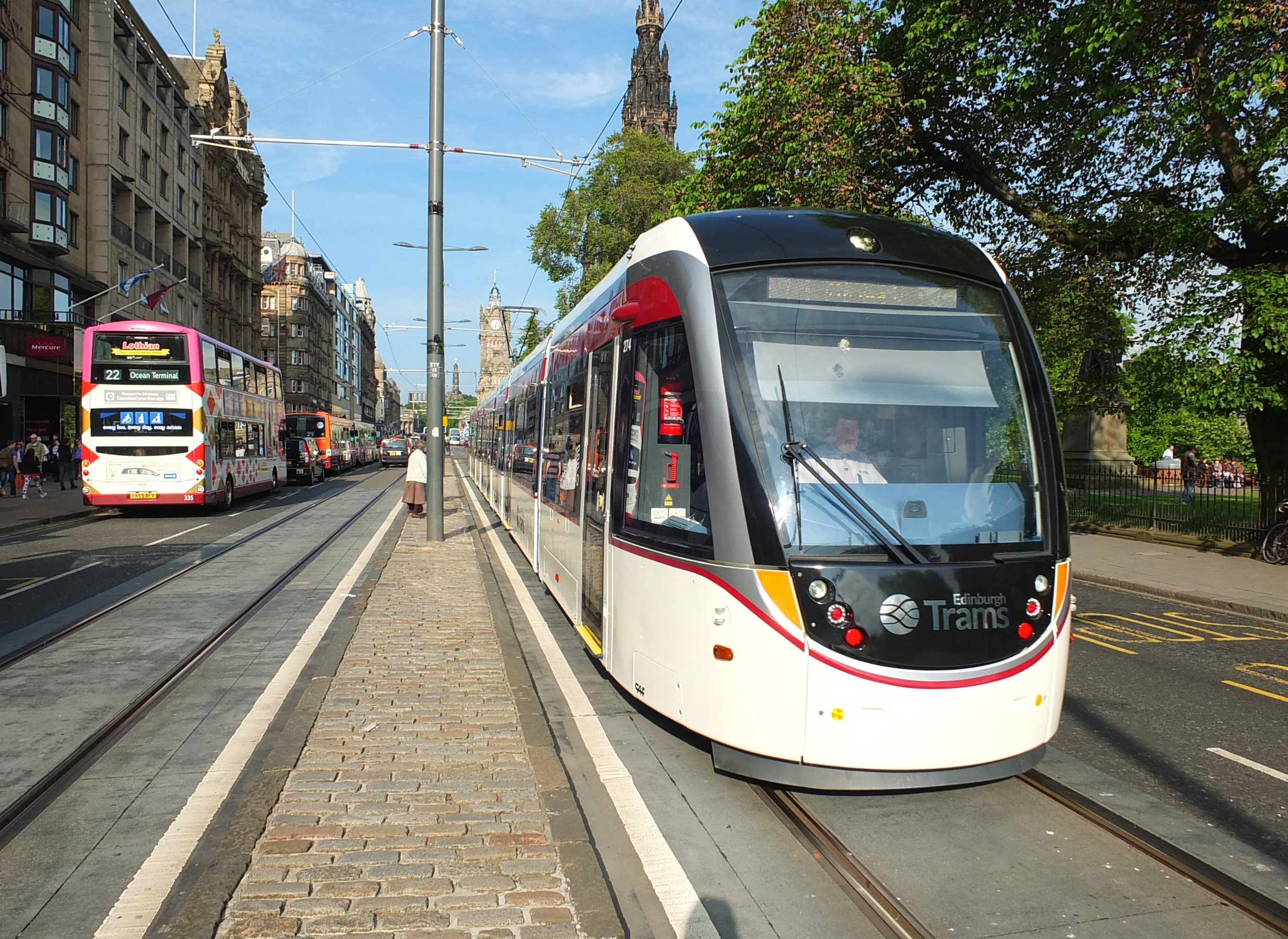
- A tram on Princes Street in May 2014

Overview
- Owner: Edinburgh Transport Holdings
- Locale: Edinburgh
- Transit type: Light rail/Tram
- Number of lines: 1
- Number of stations: 23
- Annual ridership: 12.2 million (2025)
- Headquarters: 1 Myreton Drive; Edinburgh; EH12 9GF
- Website: edinburghtrams.com

Operation
- Began operation: 31 May 2014
- Operator: Edinburgh Trams Ltd.
- Number of vehicles: 27 CAF Urbos 3
- Train length: 42.8 m (140 ft 5 in)
- Headway: 7–10 minutes

Technical
- System length: 18.5 km (11.5 mi)
- Track gauge: 1,435 mm (4 ft 8 1/2 in) standard gauge
- Electrification: Overhead line, 750 V DC
- Top speed: 70 km/h (43 mph)

Edinburgh Trams is a tramway in Edinburgh, Scotland, operated by Edinburgh Trams Ltd. It is an 18.5-kilometre (11.5 mi) line between Newhaven and Edinburgh Airport, with 23 stops.

A modern tram network for Edinburgh was proposed by Edinburgh Council in 1999. Construction of the first phase, linking Edinburgh Airport with Newhaven, began in June 2008, but encountered substantial delays and cost overruns, before eventually opening on 31 May 2014. These delays were later subject to a public enquiry that concluded in 2023. At the time of opening, the route only went between the airport and York Place. It was later extended in 2016 and 2023.

The service is operated by Edinburgh Trams Ltd., a wholly owned subsidiary of Edinburgh Transport Holdings, in which the City of Edinburgh Council has a controlling interest. The service is equipped with 27 CAF Urbos 3 vehicles. It runs at a seven-minute interval for most of the day, seven days per week. Fares and ticketing are integrated with Lothian Buses, with the same fares charged on both systems, except for services to the airport where the tram is more expensive. In May 2025, contactless payment was introduced for the trams, with a 'tap on, tap off' scheme.

In August 2025, a public consultation was launched for an additional extension serving the north–south axis of the city.

== History ==
=== Background ===
Edinburgh and Leith were originally served by horse-drawn coaches, and then from 1871 various companies and corporations ran trams that were horse-drawn, then cable driven and finally electric. The municipal Edinburgh Corporation Tramways ran from 1919 until 16 November 1956. After that date, public transport consisted of buses and a limited network of commuter rail lines.

Towards the end of the 20th century, there was revived interest in trams in the United Kingdom and networks were reintroduced in Birmingham, Croydon, Manchester, Nottingham and Sheffield. Proposals for a network in Edinburgh were made in the 1990s, and a plan to build a line along Princes Street and Leith Walk to Newhaven was proposed in 1999 by the City of Edinburgh Council, Lothian and Edinburgh Enterprise and the New Edinburgh Tramways Company.

=== Initial proposals and agreement ===
A 2001 proposal envisaged three routes, lines 1, 2 and 3. The first was a circular route around the northern suburbs, and the others were radial routes to Newbridge in the west and Newcraighall in the south. All lines would have passed through the city centre. In May 2004, a 15-year operating contract was awarded to Transdev, to operate and maintain the tram network. This contract was cancelled in 2009.

Edinburgh Tram (Line One) Act 2006
- Act of the Scottish Parliament
- Scottish Parliament
- Long title: An Act of the Scottish Parliament to authorise the construction and operation of a tram line in Edinburgh following a western course from St Andrew Square, via Princes Street, Haymarket, Murrayfield and South Gyle to Edinburgh Airport and Newbridge; and for connected purposes.
- Citation: 2006 asp 7

Dates
- Royal assent: 8 May 2006
Other legislation
Amended by	Transport (Scotland) Act 2019

Status: Amended

Text of statute as originally enacted

Text of the Edinburgh Tram (Line One) Act 2006 as in force today (including any amendments) within the United Kingdom, from legislation.gov.uk.

Edinburgh Tram (Line Two) Act 2006
- Act of the Scottish Parliament
- Scottish Parliament
- Long title: An Act of the Scottish Parliament to authorise the construction and operation of a tram line in Edinburgh forming a loop from St Andrew Square, along Leith Walk to Leith, west to Granton, south to Haymarket and back to St Andrew Square via Princes Street; and for connected purposes.
- Citation: 2006 asp 6

Dates
- Royal assent: 27 April 2006
Other legislation
Amended by	Transport (Scotland) Act 2019

Status: Amended

Text of statute as originally enacted

Text of the Edinburgh Tram (Line Two) Act 2006 as in force today (including any amendments) within the United Kingdom, from legislation.gov.uk.

Two bills to reintroduce a tram network were passed by the Scottish Parliament in March 2006. Lines 1 and 2 received permission in the Edinburgh Tram (Line One) Act 2006 (asp 7) and the Edinburgh Tram (Line Two) Act 2006 (asp 6) respectively, but funding the entire network was deemed impossible. Line 3, to be paid for by a proposed Edinburgh congestion charge, was scrapped when the charge was heavily defeated in a referendum and construction of the remaining two lines was split into four phases:

- Phase 1a 18.5-kilometre (11.5 mi) from Newhaven to Edinburgh Airport via Princes Street, combining parts of lines 1 and 2
- Phase 1b 5.6-kilometre (3.5 mi) from Haymarket to Granton Square via Crewe Toll, comprising most of the remainder of line 1
- Phase 2 linking Granton Square and Newhaven, completing the line 1 loop
- Phase 3 extending the airport line to Newbridge, completing line 2

A map of the planned tramway

The future of the scheme came under threat in 2007, when the Scottish National Party (SNP) published its manifesto for the Scottish Parliamentary election. The party made clear its intention to cancel the scheme, along with the Edinburgh Airport Rail Link, to save £1.1 billion.

Following a lost vote in the Scottish Parliament, the SNP-led minority Scottish Government agreed to continue the line from the airport to Leith on condition that no more public money would be supplied. A report by Audit Scotland, commissioned by the Scottish Government, confirmed that the cost projections were sound. The cost of the scheme in 2003 was estimated at £498 million, £375 million in funding from the Scottish Government and £45 million from Edinburgh Council.

On 25 October 2007, the council approved the final business case. Approval was given on 22 December 2007 for TIE to sign contracts with CAF to supply vehicles and BBS (a consortium of Bilfinger Berger and Siemens) to design and construct the network. Contract negotiations finished in April 2008, and construction started in June 2008. By this stage the cost of the project was estimated at £521 million. Funding problems and political disputes led to the scaling back of the original plans. In April 2009, the council cancelled phase 1b, citing revenue shortfall created by the Great Recession to save an estimated £75 million. The Granton extension was also cancelled for the same purpose.

=== Construction: 2007–2012 ===
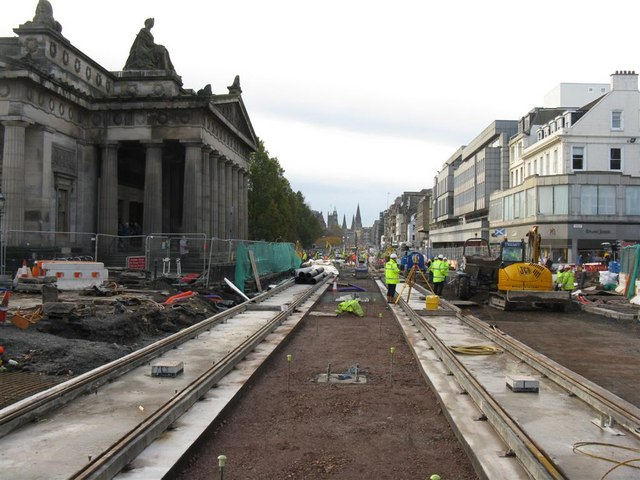
Tracks being laid on Princes Street in November 2009

Until August 2011, the project was overseen by Transport Initiatives Edinburgh (TIE), a company wholly owned by the City of Edinburgh Council, who were responsible for project-managing the construction of the tramway.

After the draft business case was accepted by the Scottish Government in March 2007, initial construction work commenced in July 2007, with the diversion of underground utilities in preparation for track-laying in Leith. These works followed a plan by System Design Services (SDS), a joint design team led by Parsons Brinckerhoff and Halcrow Group.

In May 2008, final contracts to build the tram system were awarded to BSC, a consortium of Bilfinger Berger, Siemens and Spanish tram builder Construcciones y Auxiliar de Ferrocarriles (CAF).

The tramway uses a mix of street running and segregated off-road track, with conventional tram stop platforms. Stops are fitted with shelters, ticket machines, lighting and CCTV. The network is operated from a depot in Gogar, close to the A8 roundabout, immediately west of Edinburgh Gateway tram stop.

The route of the line required the construction of bridges to cross railway lines at Edinburgh Park and Stenhouse, and a tunnel under the A8 near the Gogar roundabout. A bridge at Balgreen was widened. Works to build a tram interchange at Haymarket station involved the demolition of a Category C(S) listed building, the former Caledonian Alehouse on Haymarket Terrace.

Some on-street track was laid in a special foundation with cobbled road surfacing designed to be sympathetic with the style of Edinburgh streets but was removed in many places due to objections from cyclists. The trams are powered by overhead cables attached to purpose-built poles or mounted on the sides of buildings. Nine electrical sub-stations were planned for the line to Newhaven, both underground and above-ground but only five were built after the line was truncated at York Place.

==== Revisions and delays ====
In 2008 and 2009, the project met with delays to work on tramway infrastructure. Phase 1b of the project was cancelled because of a funding shortfall in April 2009. Contractual disputes delayed track-laying in the city centre. In December 2009, media reported that the project budget was running over £545 million, and the system was unlikely to come into operation until February 2012 or later. The operating contract with Transdev was cancelled in December 2009 to reduce costs and it was announced that the trams would be operated by Edinburgh Trams Limited, a subsidiary of Transport for Edinburgh. During March 2010, Bilfinger Berger announced that the estimated completion date would be in 2014.

==== Contractual disputes ====
In February 2009, work on the Princes Street section stopped due to contractual disagreements between TIE and BSC after the latter submitted a request for an additional £80 million of funding. Edinburgh Council believed the contractors' claims were unjustified as they had agreed to fixed-price contracts. After negotiations, BSC agreed to commence construction in March 2009 within the original budget, although disagreements remained. Work restarted and line construction went ahead.

In August 2009, TIE began legal proceedings against the BSC consortium over delays to the project, and track-laying on Leith Walk, Shandwick Place and Haymarket was suspended. At issue were alleged changes to BSC's work specification, including track works on Princes Street and £5 million additional costs for foundation work near Murrayfield Stadium. The BSC consortium alleged that TIE had not diverted the underground utilities in time for track-laying to begin, breaching contractual agreements and costing the consortium additional staffing expenditure.

In January 2010, the independent arbiter found in favour of TIE on some points, but on most of the disputed issues ruled in favour of BSC and awarded the consortium 90% of its additional costs, estimated to be up to £80 million.

Delays in track laying and depot construction affected vehicle testing. By September 2009, construction was reported to be nine months behind schedule, and CAF was due to deliver the first trams from its factory in Spain. With key project dependency out of synchronisation, TIE held discussions with Transport for London about delivering the trams to Croydon to conduct operational tests on the Tramlink network. Tram vehicle testing commenced in March 2010 on the Siemens test track in Wildenrath, Germany. The tests included recreating the steep gradients of Leith Walk, and using weights to simulate the heavy passenger load expected during a Murrayfield match day.

==== Funding crisis ====
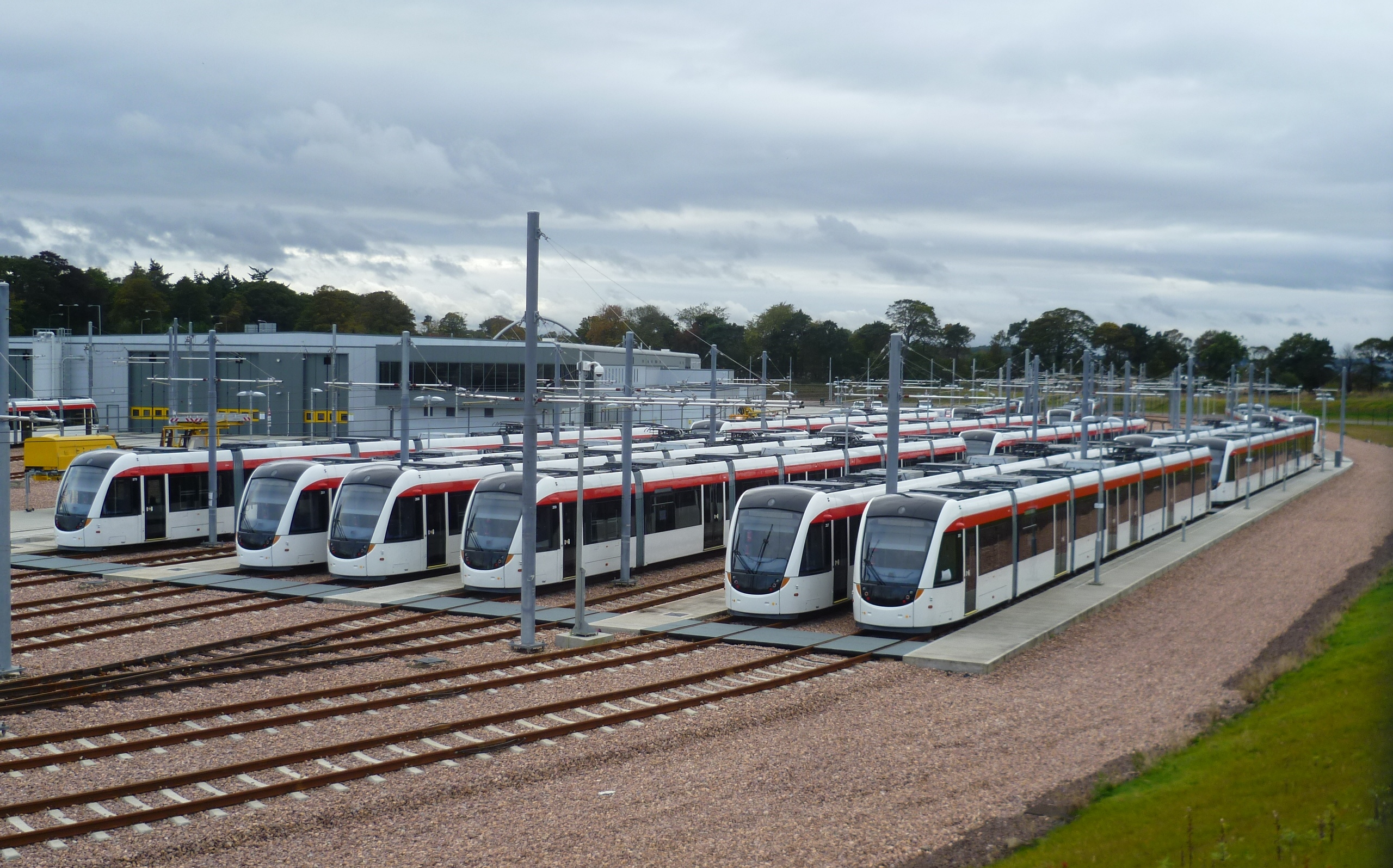
Gogar depot in October 2012

Following further disputes and delays, it was reported in March 2010 that Edinburgh Council was considering cancelling the contract with Bilfinger Berger. By June 2010, the project's cost had risen to £600 million. Council project managers were reported to be in crisis talks, considering options including: borrowing £55 million to fund the increased costs; phasing the introduction of the tram line, so that trams would initially run between the airport and Haymarket; and terminating the contract with Bilfinger Berger. The council asked TIE to draw up costs for truncating the line at four places: Haymarket station, York Place, the foot of Leith Walk or Ocean Terminal.

Work resumed in May 2011 at priority locations, Haymarket Yards and Gogar, while the project's future was decided by the council. In August 2011 it was announced TIE would be disbanded and consultants Turner & Townsend would manage the project.

On 30 June 2011, Edinburgh Council voted to continue the line between Edinburgh Airport and St Andrew Square. Costs rose to an estimated £770 million, leaving the council with a shortfall of more than £200 million. The option to scrap the project was considered, but rejected. On 25 August 2011, the council voted to cut the line to run between the airport and Haymarket, reducing the expected cost to £715 million. A week later, after the Scottish Government threatened to withhold £72 million of funding, the council reversed its decision, restoring the terminus at St Andrew Square. On 29 November 2011, it was announced that the eastern terminus would be at York Place instead of St Andrew Square; the intention had been to build the tracks to a reversing point at York Place (without a stop for passengers). Extending passenger services from St Andrew Square to York Place would enable Broughton Street, Picardy Place and the surrounding area to be better served at comparatively little additional cost.

The first electric wires were energised in October 2011 within the depot at Gogar. Testing trams began in December 2011 near the depot at Gogar, on a 500-metre (550 yd) length of track. On 15 December 2011, the contractors handed the depot to the City of Edinburgh Council. The first completed section of line, between the depot and Edinburgh Airport, was used to test a tram at full speed on 19 December 2012.

With extra interest payments factored in, the cost of the line was expected to exceed £1 billion despite the decreased scope of the network.

==== Criticism ====
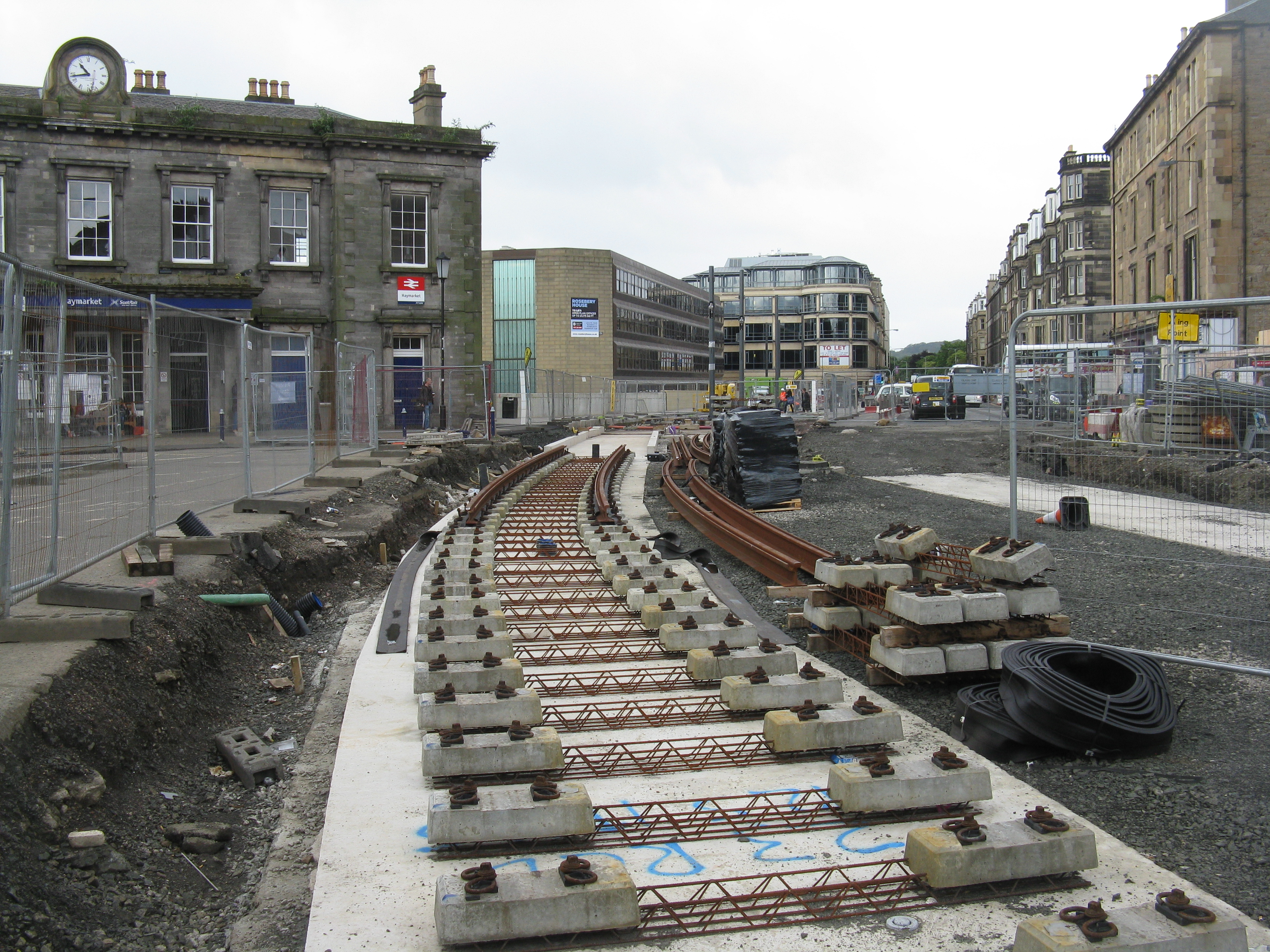
Construction works outside Haymarket railway station in August 2012

Delays in construction were criticised by businesses, who claimed their income was damaged by long-term road closures in the centre of the city, and also by some residents.

Cycling groups voiced safety concerns after people were injured as their bicycle wheels became caught in the track. They reported the road surface around the tracks was crumbling, raising further safety problems. In response, TiE promised to carry out repairs and Edinburgh Trams agreed to fund special training for cyclists. During 2017, a woman was crushed to death by a passing bus, possibly due to her bicycle wheel having been caught in tram tracks. Further safety concerns were raised by residents along the routes about the suspension of overhead electric cables from residential buildings, and some property owners refused permission for cables to be attached.

To remedy crumbling tarmac along the tracks on Princes Street, the road was closed in September 2011 and remained closed for ten months. A road closure between Haymarket and Shandwick Place in March 2012 led to complaints from businesses and residents. It remained closed until October 2013. Originally to open as Shandwick Place tram stop, it was renamed West End - Princes Street prior to opening at the request of local traders, who felt the new name had greater associations to the city centre and would encourage more tourists to get off there. The stop was renamed again in August 2019 as West End.

=== Completion: 2013–2014 ===
From late 2012, work continued mostly on schedule. More than 150 metres (160 yd) of flawed concrete trackbed had to be replaced between Shandwick Place and Haymarket. In June 2013, overhead electric wires were installed on the city centre portion of the route. This was considered the last major step in the construction process.

Originally, it was planned that concessionary travel, that is the ability of those with a Scottish National Entitlement Card to travel on public transport free of charge, was not going to be offered on the tramway. This was despite the fact that Edinburgh Trams is to be run by Lothian Buses, who are mandated to offer free travel to those with concession cards on all their bus routes. This revelation quickly caused city leaders to support an Edinburgh Evening News campaign to ensure that concessionary travel would be offered on the new tramway. City transport convener Lesley Hinds stated "People in Edinburgh have paid through their council tax and their taxes for the trams to get up and running and it would be wrong for a large proportion of the population not to be allowed to use their concessionary bus pass".

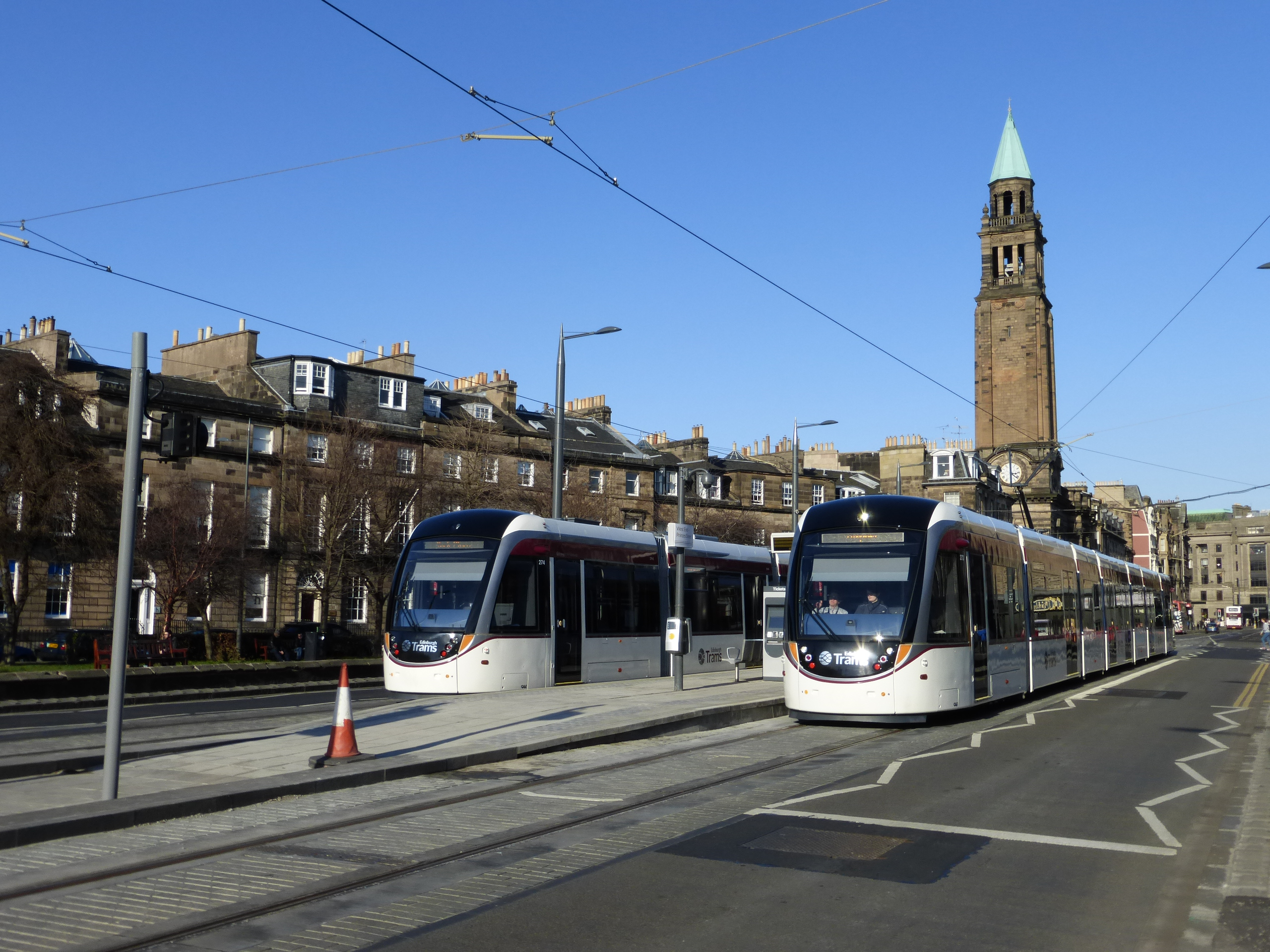
Trams on Shandwick Place during driver training in March 2014

Despite this, the Scottish Government refused to pay for concessionary travel for the tram scheme, as it does for all bus routes in Scotland. Talks between the Scottish Government and Edinburgh Council eventually decided that concession cards should be valid for tram travel, but that they should be paid for by the Council instead of the Government. It was revealed on 15 August 2013 that the cards would be valid, and that travel would be paid for by Edinburgh Council. However, only people with cards issued in Edinburgh would be able to use them. This compromise upset many people in the Lothians, who often commute or travel into Edinburgh.

Works were two months ahead of schedule by September 2013, when Edinburgh Council announced the tramway would open by May 2014. All tram and road works were completed by 19 October with testing of the trams between the depot and Edinburgh Park commencing on 8 October 2013. This was followed by the energising of tram wires from Bankhead tram stop to York Place on 19 November, marking the first time that the route was completely energised. Testing along the full length of the route began on 5 December.

The tramway opened to passengers on 31 May 2014.

=== Public inquiry ===
In June 2014, shortly after the opening of the line, the then First Minister Alex Salmond announced a non-statutory public inquiry into the project's delays and cost overruns. The inquiry, which was headed by the former Lord Advocate, Andrew Hardie, Baron Hardie, was later upgraded to a statutory inquiry to ensure that key personnel would provide evidence.

The inquiry was itself subject to considerable delays. It finally published its report in August 2023. The report concluded that failings by Edinburgh Council, TIE, and the Scottish Government were to blame for the delays, with much of the criticism being directed against TIE. Lord Hardie made 24 recommendations in the report, and also provided a figure of £835.7m for the final cost of the project.

=== Extension from city centre to Newhaven ===
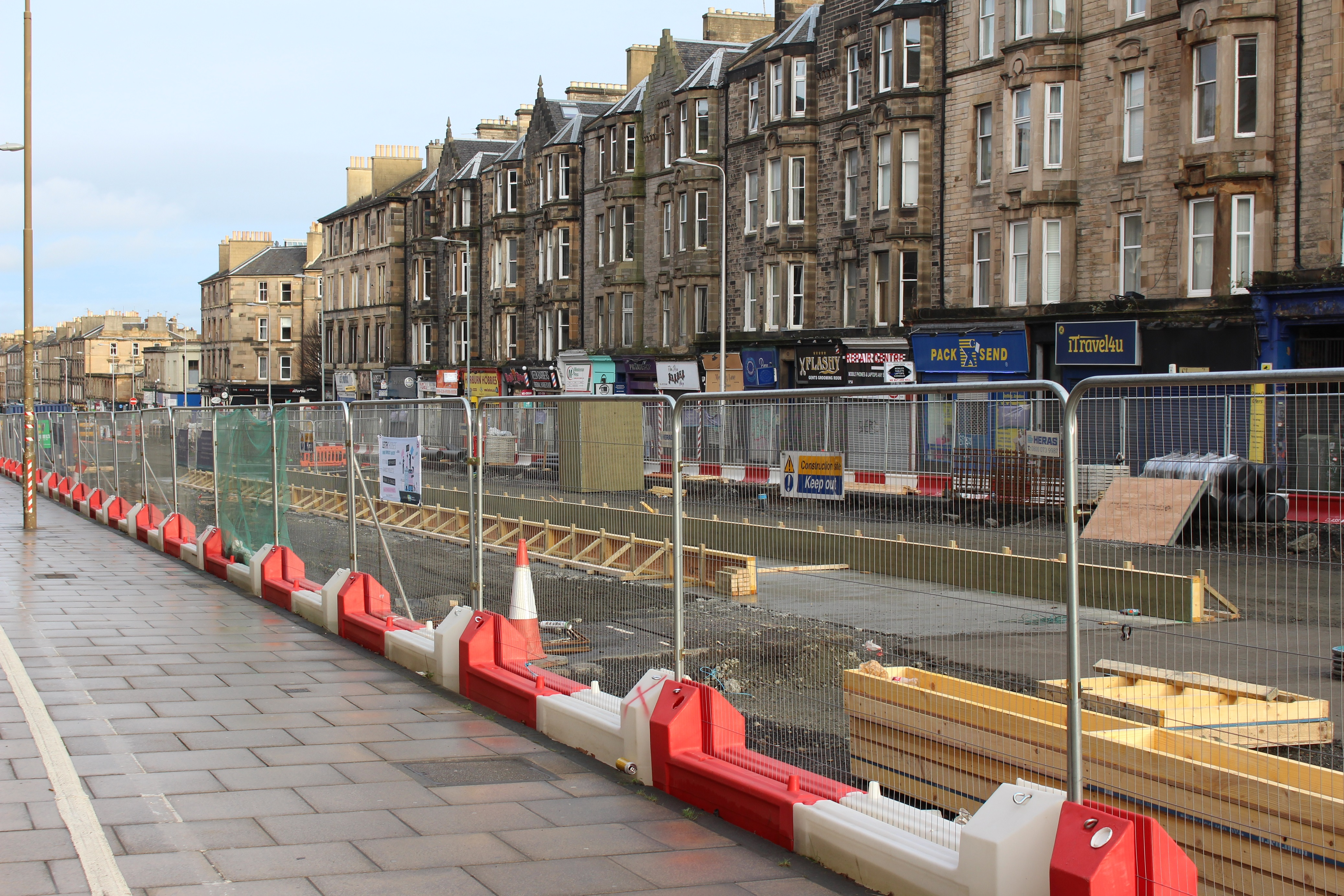
Construction work on Leith Walk in 2021

Edinburgh Council stated on 17 March 2014 that works would be conducted along Leith Walk to prepare it for a possible future extension of tram service. In December 2014, Edinburgh Council ordered a detailed business case for extending the line to Leith. The council said in July 2015 that three options for an extension to Leith had been costed. These were a £144.7 million extension to Newhaven, a £126.6 million extension to Ocean Terminal, or a £78.7 million extension to the Foot of Leith Walk.

During 2017, the business case to extend the system to Newhaven was approved.

In June 2018, Colin Beattie, the MSP for Midlothian North and Musselburgh, and others, suggested that the system should be extended to Musselburgh to relieve traffic congestion on the approaches to the City Bypass.

In March 2019, Edinburgh Council approved extending the system from York Place to Newhaven, with the line due to be operational by early 2023. Preliminary works to Constitution Street and Leith Walk started in November 2019. Work was suspended in March 2020 due to the coronavirus pandemic but was restarted in June 2020.

In February 2022, the eastern terminating York Place stop was permanently closed for demolition and to enable connection to the Newhaven extension which relocated the York Place stop to Picardy Place. Services initially terminated at the West End stop between February and April 2022, and then the St Andrew Square stop before June 2023; however, trams still ran to York Place to turn back.

On 13 March 2023, following completion of tracklaying and the installation of overhead power lines, test trams began running during the night between Picardy Place and Newhaven, becoming the first tram to run in Leith since the closure of the original tramway system. The first test trams ran at walking pace, but their speed was later increased to 20 miles per hour (32 km/h). Daytime testing commenced on 19 April 2023, with 40 newly recruited drivers under training. After an announcement on 25 May 2023, revenue service on the full route began on 7 June 2023.

In June 2024, the Trams to Newhaven project won an award from the Local Government Chronicle in its Future Places category, with the citation praising "[t]he deep collaboration between the council and private sector partners".

=== Further north to south extension ===
During the early 2020s, plans were being prepared for a new line which would connect Granton in the north of the city with the Bioquarter in the south east, and possibly further onto either Dalkeith or Queen Margaret University or Shawfair. At a meeting on 1 February 2024, City of Edinburgh Council voted to put the proposed north–south extension to public consultation; by this point, it had an estimated construction cost of £2bn.

In August 2025, a 12-week public consultation was launched for this extension serving the north–south axis of the city. This could link Granton in the north to Crewe Toll, then either via the Roseburn Path to Murrayfield or via Orchard Brae and Dean Bridge to the west end of Princes Street. To the south, the proposals would see trams run over North Bridge and South Bridge, through Newington to Cameron Toll along Lady Road, then along Old Dalkeith Road to the Royal Infirmary and BioQuarter. A lift connecting the North Bridge tram stop to Waverley railway station below is also proposed. The cost is estimated at between £2bn and £2.9bn depending on the option considered.

Future extensions beyond into the city region could link to Queen Margaret University and East Lothian or to Shawfair and Midlothian.

== Annual patronage ==
Estimated passenger journeys (million) made on Edinburgh Trams by financial year (to 31 March)
Year	Passenger journeys	Year	Passenger journeys	Year	Passenger journeys
2014–15	4.1	2022–23	5.3		
2015–16	5.3	2023–24	10.1		
2016–17	5.8	2024–25	12.2		
2017–18	6.8	2025–26			
2018–19	7.5	2026–27			
2019–20	7.1	2027–28			
2020–21	0.9	2028–29			
2021–22	2.8	2029–30			
Estimates from the Department for Transport

== Current line ==
=== Route ===
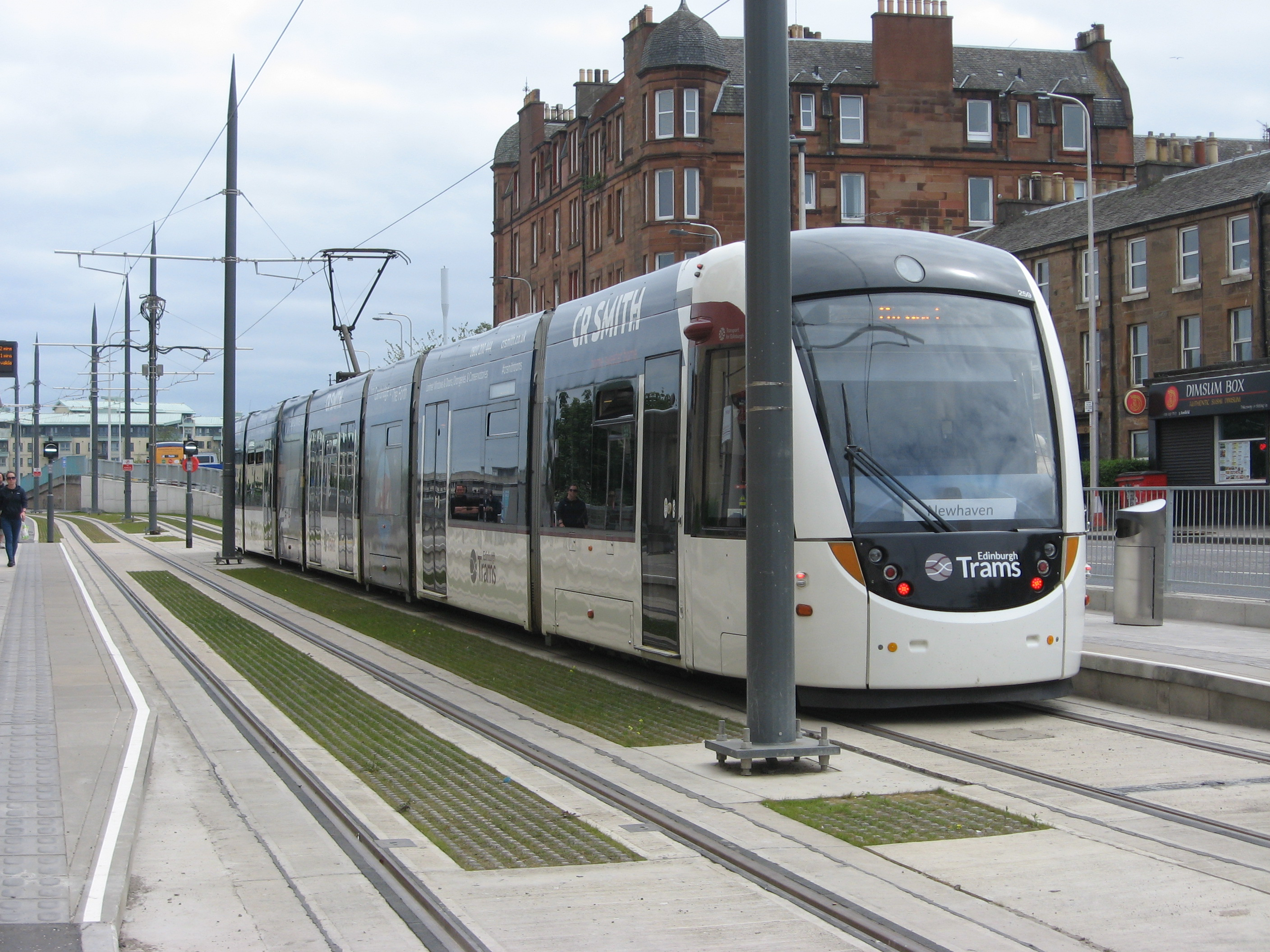
A tram arriving at the terminus in Newhaven shortly after the opening of the extension in June 2023

The single, 18.5-kilometre (11.5 mi) route begins running on-street at Newhaven, and then, via an 8 stop extension which opened in June 2023, from the port of Leith to York Place (now served by Picardy Place) in the city centre. It turns into North St Andrew Street, crosses St Andrew Square. From the square, it heads southeast into Princes Street, and west along the street toward Haymarket, via Shandwick Place, Atholl Place and West Maitland Street. At Haymarket, the route heads onto a segregated track parallel to the Glasgow to Edinburgh mainline. It follows the railway line west for about 6.8 kilometres (4.2 mi), to Edinburgh Park railway station. There, it leaves the railway line on a segregated track and heads north to Gogar Roundabout from where it heads northwest via Ingliston Park and Ride to Edinburgh Airport, where it terminates.

An additional tram stop was opened in December 2016, between Gyle Centre and Gogarburn. This stop, called Edinburgh Gateway, is situated alongside the Edinburgh Gateway railway station which opened at the same time. The station provides an interchange between Edinburgh Trams and the Fife Circle Line and Edinburgh to Aberdeen Lines. After this stop opened, crews changed here rather than at the special short platform which had been constructed alongside the nearby Gogar depot. Thus, the additional stop at Edinburgh Gateway did not affect the end-to-end running time between the Airport and York Place.

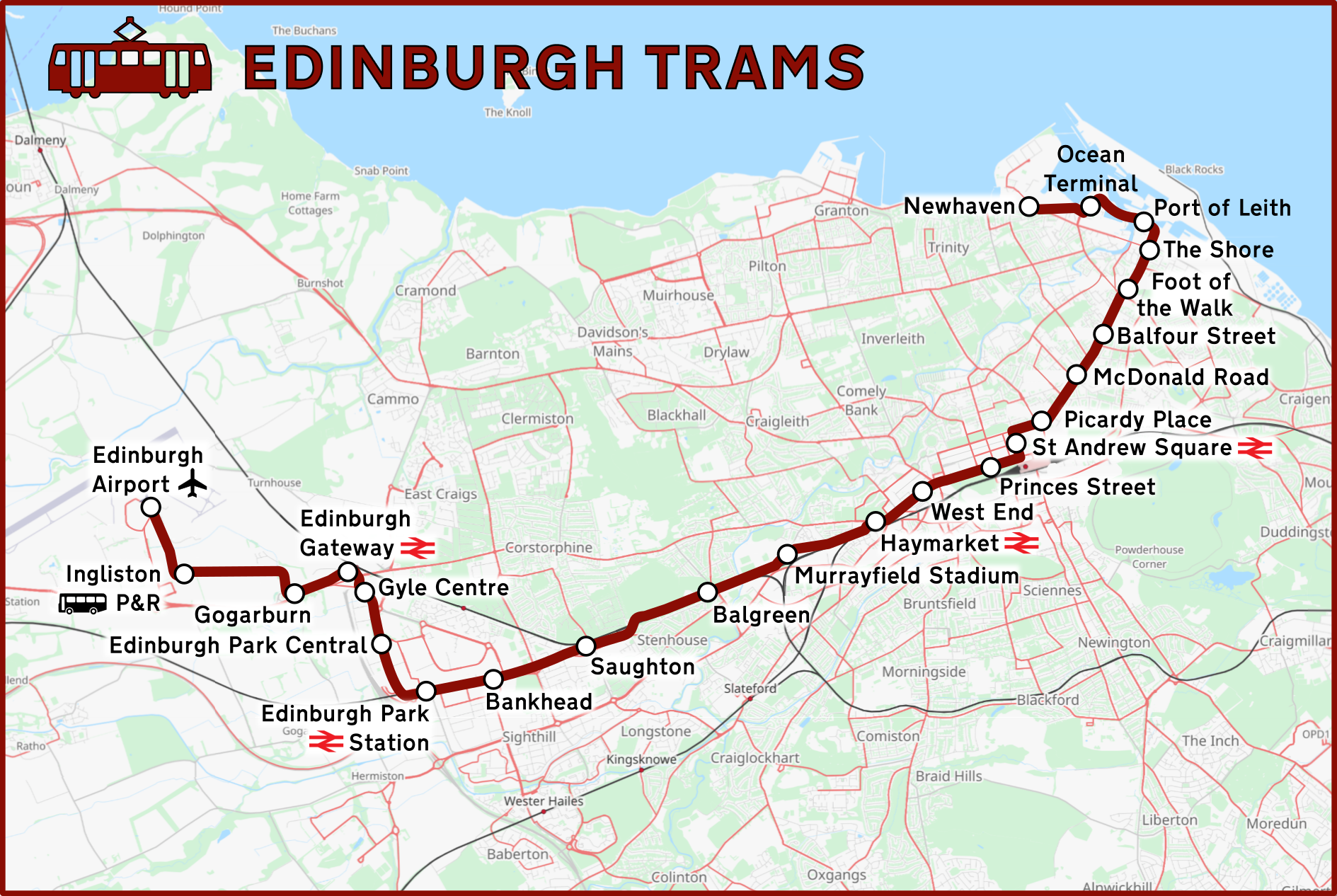
Map of the Edinburgh trams route

=== Stops ===
Image	English and Gaelic name	Location	Transport interchange	Serves	Comments
Tram at Newhaven	Newhaven (Note: has no Gaelic name)	55.9800°N 3.1889°W		Western Harbour; Firth of Forth	
Ocean Terminal tram stop	Ocean Terminal	55.9802°N 3.1777°W	Lothian Buses	Royal Yacht Britannia; Ocean Terminal shopping centre	
Port of Leith tram stop	Port of Leith; Port Lìte	55.9781°N 3.1664°W		Victoria Swing Bridge; Fingal	
The Shore tram stop	The Shore; An Cladach	55.9750°N 3.1669°W		Water of Leith	
Newhaven tram at Foot of the Walk stop	Foot of the Walk; Bun a' Cheum	55.9704°N 3.1746°W		Great Junction Street; Leith Links	
Balfour Street tram stop	Balfour Street; Sràid Balfour	55.9653°N 3.1764°W		Leith Walk (lower); Pilrig Park	
McDonald Road tram stop	McDonald Road; Rathad MhicDhòmhnaill	55.9607°N 3.1816°W		Leith Walk (upper)	
Picardy place tram stop	Picardy Place; Ceàrn Picardy	55.9569°N 3.1869°W	Lothian Buses	Broughton area Greenside area & attractions St James Quarter	Replaced the former York Place terminus
Trams at St Andrew Square	St Andrew Square; Ceàrnag an Naoimh Anndras	55.9543°N 3.1921°W	Lothian Buses; Edinburgh Bus Station; Waverley	Scottish National Portrait Gallery; St James Quarter	
Princes Street tram stop	Princes Street; Sràid a' Phrionnsa	55.9518°N 3.1978°W	Lothian Buses	Royal Scottish Academy; National Gallery of Scotland; The Mound; Royal Mile	
Shandwick Place tram stop	West End; Ceann an Iar	55.9486°N 3.2116°W		St Mary's Cathedral (Episcopal); Financial District	
Haymarket station tram stop	Haymarket; Margadh an Fheòir	55.9457°N 3.2196°W	Lothian Buses; Scottish Citylink; Haymarket	Dalry area EICC; Financial District	
Murrayfield Stadium tram stop	Murrayfield Stadium; Pàirc a' Mhoirich	55.9420°N 3.2373°W		Murrayfield Stadium; Roseburn area	
Balgreen tram stop	Balgreen; Baile Griain	55.9381°N 3.2522°W		Saughton Park; Water of Leith Walkway; Edinburgh Zoo (walk 1.25 km)	
Saughton tram stop	Saughton; Baile nan Seileach	55.9323°N 3.2755°W		Broomhouse; Carrick Knowe area Stenhouse area	
Bankhead tram stop	Bankhead; Ceann na Bruaiche	55.9289°N 3.2938°W		Edinburgh College Sighthill Campus; Napier University Sighthill Campus; South Gyle	
Edinburgh Park Station tram stop	Edinburgh Park Station; Stèisean Pàirc Dhùn Èideann	55.9274°N 3.3070°W	Edinburgh Park	Hermiston Gait Retail Park	
Edinburgh Park Central tram stop	Edinburgh Park Central; Meadhan Pàirc Dhùn Èideann	55.9313°N 3.3146°W		Edinburgh Park	
Tram stop at The Gyle	Gyle Centre; Ionad Gyle	55.9379°N 3.3183°W		Gyle Shopping Centre	
Edinburgh Gateway Tram Stop from the station	Edinburgh Gateway; Slighe Dhùn Èideann	55.9405°N 3.3218°W	Edinburgh Gateway	Interchange Stop offering links from Fife via ScotRail	
Edinburgh tram at Gogarburn	Gogarburn; Allt Gogar	55.9380°N 3.3322°W		Royal Bank of Scotland Headquarters	
Ingliston Park & Ride tram stop	Ingliston Park & Ride; Baile Inglis	55.9400°N 3.3539°W	Lothian Buses	Ingliston; Royal Highland Centre	
Edinburgh Airport tram stop	Edinburgh Airport; Port-adhair Dhùn Èideann	55.9478°N 3.3606°W	Edinburgh Airport		

=== Former stops ===
Image	English and Gaelic name	Location	Transport interchange	Served	Comments
York Place tram stop	York Place; Ceàrn Eabhraig	55.9565°N 3.1887°W	Lothian Buses	Broughton Street and neighbourhood Omni Centre; Edinburgh Playhouse; St Mary's Cathedral (RC)	Permanently closed in February 2022 due to the Newhaven extension. York Place was replaced by Picardy Place when the extension opened in 2023

=== Frequencies and journey times ===
Approximate journey times from the airport are ten minutes to Gyle Centre, 30 minutes to the city centre (Princes Street) and 55 minutes to Newhaven. The journey from the city centre to Newhaven takes approximately 25 minutes.

Services run every seven to ten minutes. As of 7 June 2023, the first service of the day leaves Gyle Centre for Newhaven at 04:26. The first service leaves Newhaven at 05:20 and the airport at 06:26. The last service of the day leaves the airport at 22:48 and Newhaven at 23:50. The timetable is broadly the same every day of the week, except for a slightly reduced early morning frequency on Saturdays and Sundays.

As the first scheduled flight leaves Edinburgh at approximately 06:00, it is not currently possible to use the tram to get to the airport in time for security and departure. Conversely it is also not possible to use the tram on later arriving flights at Edinburgh Airport.

There are often later services on Friday and Saturday nights during the Edinburgh Festival and Fringe. The service interval is often reduced to three minutes before and after major events at Murrayfield Stadium.

== Rolling stock ==
=== Current fleet ===
Edinburgh Trams currently operates a fleet of 27 trams, as follows:

Class	Image	Type	Top speed		Length metres	Capacity				In service	Orders	Fleet numbers	Routes operated	Built	Years operated
Class	Image	Type	mph	km/h	Length metres	Std	Sdg	W	Total	In service	Orders	Fleet numbers	Routes operated	Built	Years operated
CAF Urbos 3		Tram	43	70	42.8	78	170	2	250	27	—	251-277	All lines	2010–2012	2014–present
Total										27	—				

==== CAF Urbos 3 ====
A £40 million contract to build 27 Urbos 3 trams, sufficient for phase 1a and (unbuilt) 1b lines, was awarded to CAF. When the line was cut back to York Place, only 17 trams would be needed. An unsuccessful attempt was made in 2011 to lease ten trams to Transport for London for use on Tramlink.

The trams are bi-directional, 42.8 metres (140 ft 5 in) long and with low-floor access to meet UK Rail Vehicle Access Regulations for disabled people.

In April 2010, the first tram was delivered and displayed at the Princes Street stop at the bottom of The Mound, before being moved to open storage in Broxburn. The 27th tram was delivered in December 2012. The trams have wrapped advertisements for promoting local events and commercial advertising.

== Fares and ticketing ==
=== Fare structure ===
Ticketing and fares are integrated with Lothian Buses. A proof of payment system applies. The single fare within the city zone is the same as on Lothian Buses (£2, with effect from 1 April 2023); day tickets and Ridacards are equally valid on trams and buses. As an exception, the tram fare from the city zone to the airport is £7.50 one-way compared to £5.50 for the bus.

The "Ridacard" is a smartcard season ticket issued by Lothian Buses; it is valid on both Edinburgh Trams and Lothian Buses (available for one week, four weeks or annually). On 1 September 2014, a rechargeable pre-paid smartcard for single journeys on both buses and trams, called "Citysmart", was introduced.

Free travel is available to holders of City of Edinburgh Council-issued Scottish National Entitlement Cards which are eligible for concessionary travel, and for a companion travelling with the cardholder of National Entitlement Cards with a companion entitlement. Passengers with National Entitlement Cards eligible for concessionary travel but issued by other local authorities are not offered any fare concession, with the exception of blind or visually impaired cardholders. This is due to the free travel for local residents being funded by the City Council rather than the government.

An "onboard fare" of £10 is charged to passengers who have not pre-purchased a ticket or validated either a Ridacard, a National Entitlement Card or an m-ticket before boarding.

=== Ticket machines ===
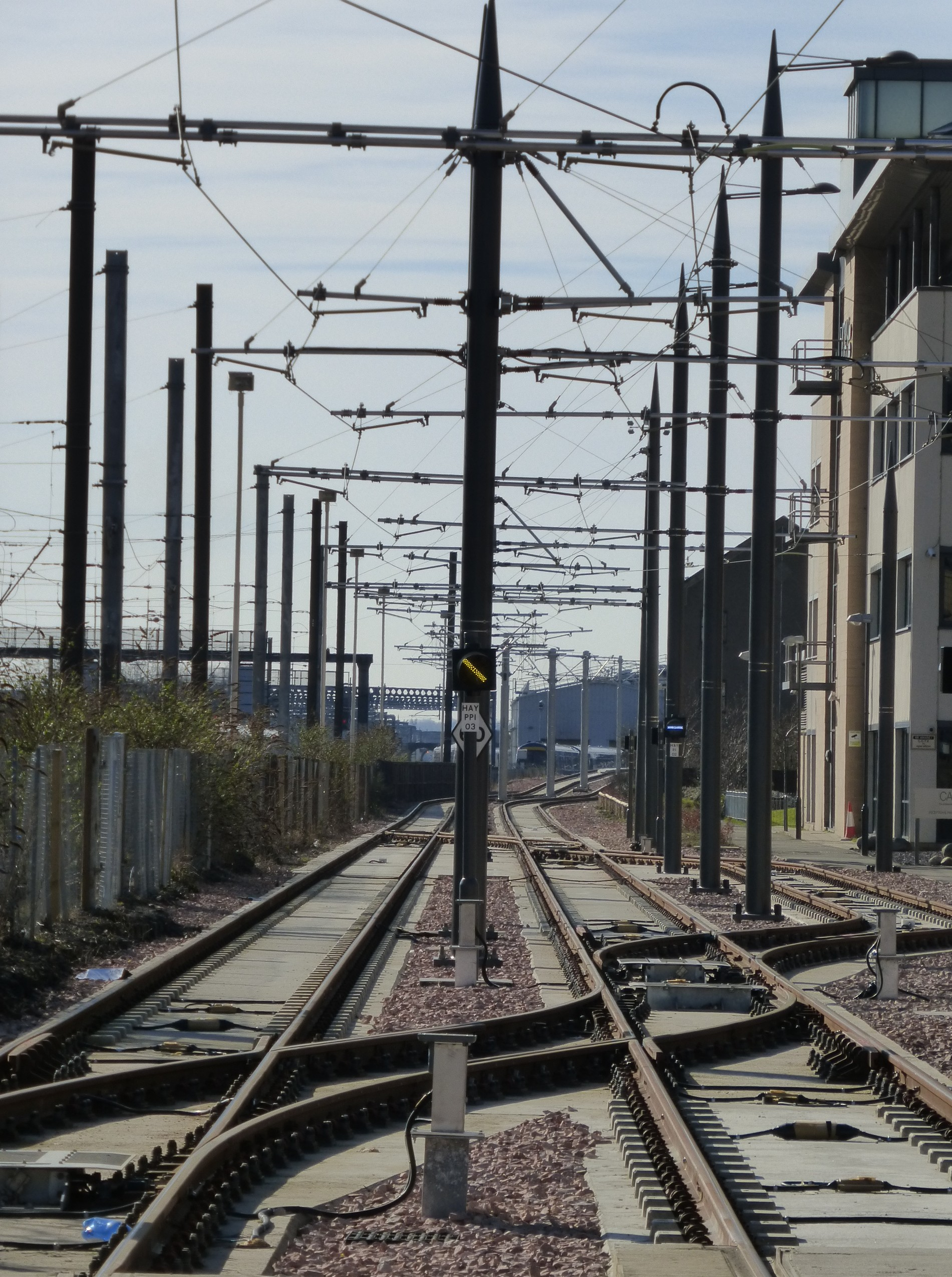
The segregated track begins in Haymarket Yards (March 2014)

At the request of Lothian Buses, installation of 30 ticket machines at key bus stops began in 2007. Passengers had to purchase tickets before boarding the bus, reducing dwell times, but the machines were not popular with users and were scrapped in 2011. Consideration was given to installing similar on-street ticket machines, and new, advanced machines (capable of reading smartcards and accepting credit/debit cards) were installed in early 2014 at each tram stop. The new ticket machines are the Galexio-Plus type supplied by Flowbird Transport Ltd. Ticket machines do not accept banknotes or give change. The minimum spend for a card transaction was originally £3 which was more than the cost for a single ticket. The minimum spend was scrapped in September 2019, following complaints from customers and negative press comments.

On 19 May 2025, Edinburgh trams introduced contactless payment, with a 'tap on, tap off' (TOTO) scheme, to account for the more expensive airport zone. If passengers fail to tap off at a stop, they will be charged the full Airport Zone fare of £7.90. However, fares on both Lothian Buses and the trams have daily and weekly caps.

== Services ==
Services run every seven minutes throughout the entire line, between St Andrew Square and Edinburgh Airport. On 7 June 2023, the services extended north from St Andrew Square to Newhaven, connecting Leith more quickly than bus services from the city centre, for the first time in almost 70 years.

=== Bicycle policy ===
In May and June 2015, cyclists were allowed to board the trams with their bikes, during a trial period which was supported by cycle campaign groups Spokes and Pedal on Parliament. Following this, Edinburgh trams became the first modern tram network in the UK to permit the carriage of bikes on a permanent basis, with up to two bicycles being allowed per tram outwith peak hours (7.30 am to 9.30 am, and 4 pm to 6.30 pm) and excluding the period of the Edinburgh Festival and the Festival Fringe (usually 3 1/2 weeks during August) and other large events.

== Corporate affairs ==
=== Ownership and structure ===
Edinburgh Trams Limited is a wholly owned subsidiary company of Edinburgh Transport Holdings. By virtue of its controlling interest in the parent's equity capital, the City of Edinburgh Council is the ultimate controlling party.

=== Business trends ===
The key trends for Edinburgh Trams Limited since it commenced operations in May 2014 are (years ending 31 December):

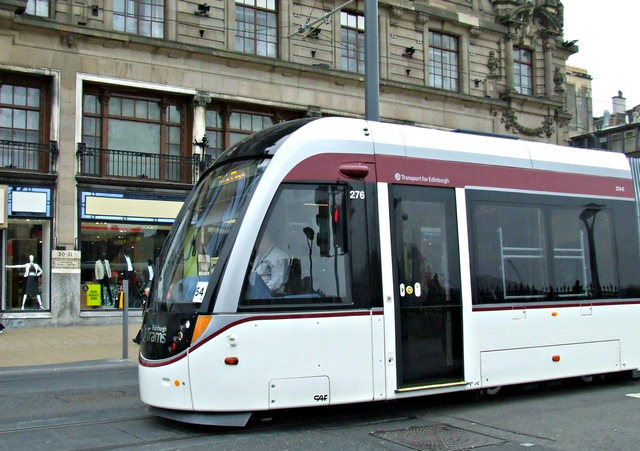
An Edinburgh tram, pictured in 2014

	2014	2015	2016	2017	2018	2019	2020	2021	2022	2023	2024
Turnover (£m)				12.99	15.81	16.75	5.19	6.28	13.60	23.81	28.82
Operating profit (£m)	−0.45	−0.25	0.25	1.60	−9.40	−7.88	−7.68	−7.21	−11.59	−10.62	−8.95
Net profit after tax (£m)				1.29	−7.62	−8.99	−8.87	−8.76	−10.89	−10.33	−9.64
Number of employees (average)	130			163	189	210	218	207	245	292	327
Number of passengers (m)	2.95	5.20	5.59	6.67	7.30	7.45	2.25	2.59	4.78	9.18	12.1
Number of trams (at year end)	27	27	27	27	27	27	27	27	27	27	27
Notes/sources											

Edinburgh Trams made a pre-tax profit of £252,000 for 2016, against a predicted loss of £170,000, which meant that profitability had been achieved two years ahead of schedule. This was based on excluding maintenance and infrastructure costs. Including these, as has been done since 2018 when these costs were shifted to Edinburgh Trams, the small operating profit (£3 million) has turned to a large operating loss (e.g. £9.4 million in 2018). It has not achieved an operating profit since full costing.

=== Staffing ===
Fifty-two ticket inspectors have been recruited to prevent fare dodging. Edinburgh Council is aiming for a 3% fare evasion rate, lower than any other tramway in Britain. Thirty-two drivers were employed, after passing psychological tests designed to eliminate risk-takers.

== Accidents and incidents ==
Frequent accidents involving cyclists and the tramway have been reported since the opening of the system in 2014. These are typically caused by bicycle wheels getting stuck in the rails or by bikes skidding on the rails. A study published in 2018 found that, up to April 2016, 191 cyclists in Edinburgh had suffered tramway-related accidents serious enough to require hospital treatment. In September 2022, using Freedom of Information (FoI) data, the BBC reported that there had been 422 accidents involving cyclists on the tram tracks, as a result of which 196 cyclists had made successful claims against Edinburgh City Council, resulting in nearly £1.3 million being paid in damages. Following a further FoI request in September 2024, it was reported there had been 112 collisions between trams and other road vehicles since 2014, as well as four collisions involving cyclists (not including incidents involving cyclists and trams tracks).

Noteworthy accidents include:

- On 29 August 2014, a bus and tram collided in the West End of Edinburgh, causing severe traffic congestion.
- On 31 May 2017, a medical student was killed in Princes Street when she fell into the path of a minibus after her bike wheels may have become stuck in the tram rails. However, the exact cause of her fall is not known.
- On 13 June 2018, a bus and tram collided near Edinburgh Airport, seriously injuring the bus driver.
- On 11 September 2018, a pedestrian was killed by a tram on a crossing near Saughton tram stop. The Rail Accident Investigation Branch determined that the tram's warning bell was not loud enough, and that Edinburgh Trams should better monitor risks at crossings. The tram company was subsequently fined £240,000 for breaches of health and safety regulations. In May 2025, a fatal accident inquiry at the Edinburgh Sheriff Court ruled that steps could have been taken by the tram operators that might have prevented the accident. These included ensuring that warning bells on trams were loud enough to be heard above the background noise, improving the design and layout of the crossing to make it more obvious to pedestrians that they were in an area of higher risk, and providing additional signs to warn tram drivers of the last emergency braking point before this type of crossing. The tram company has since replaced the horns on Edinburgh trams and have redesigned the crossing where the accident occurred.
- On 7 November 2025, a 66 year old man was admitted to hospital after becoming trapped under a tram at the junction between Constitution Street and Queen Charlotte Street.
- On 24 May 2026, a 19-year old woman was seriously injured after being hit by a tram in Leith Walk.
- Between 9 July and 29 August 2026, tram services were interrupted as a result of a fire in a former hotel and department store in Princes Street, with services running only between Edinburgh Airport and the West End.

== See also ==
- Edinburgh Airport Rail Link
- Light Rail Transit Association
- List of tramways in Scotland
- Proposals for new tram lines in Edinburgh
- Edinburgh Tram Inquiry
- Scottish Tramway and Transport Society
- Transport in Edinburgh
