= Edinburgh Tram Inquiry =

The Edinburgh Tram Inquiry was a public inquiry, chaired by Lord Hardie, that was held in Edinburgh to establish why the Edinburgh Trams project incurred delays, cost more than originally budgeted and delivered significantly less than was projected. Its report, which was published in September 2023, put much of the blame for the delays and cost overruns on Edinburgh Council and on various arms-length companies employed by the council, singling out Transport Initiatives Edinburgh for particular criticism.

Due to the inquiry's own long delay and mounting costs, it was accused of turning into a "bigger scandal than the one it was set up to look into in the first place".

== Timetable ==
On 5 June 2014, First Minister Alex Salmond announced a non-statutory public inquiry. On 12 June 2014 the Scottish Parliament was told that the inquiry would be headed by the former Lord Advocate, Andrew Hardie, Baron Hardie. The Scottish Government subsequently announced on 7 November 2014 that the inquiry was to be upgraded to a statutory inquiry to ensure that key personnel would provide evidence. The Solicitor for the inquiry was Gordon McNicoll and Senior Counsel was Jonathan Lake QC. No time frame was set for how long the inquiry would take.

The first preliminary hearing took place on 6 October 2015. It had been set back by a few weeks after Lord Hardie had a short unexpected stay in hospital.

Anticipating some complexity around legal representation of the parties involved, Lord Hardie asked core participants to consider what conflicts of interest might exist and provide written responses to the inquiry by 27 November.

On 2 November 2022, over 8 years after its establishment, the inquiry issued warning letters to persons it proposed to make significant or explicit criticism of. Recipients would have a right of response, which would have to be taken into account before the report was published. Publication of the final report was expected to be some months away, and well into 2023 at the earliest.

== Terms of Reference ==
The terms of reference for the inquiry were as follows:

- To inquire into the delivery of the Edinburgh Trams project (“the project”), from proposals for the project emerging to its completion, including the procurement and contract preparation, its governance, project management and delivery structures, and oversight of the relevant contracts, in order to establish why the project incurred delays, cost considerably more than originally budgeted for and delivered significantly less than was projected through reductions in scope.
- To examine the consequences of the failure to deliver the project in the time, within the budget and to the extent projected.
- To otherwise review the circumstances surrounding the project as necessary, in order to report to the Scottish Ministers making recommendations as to how major tram and light rail infrastructure projects of a similar nature might avoid such failures in future.

The inquiry team was based in Edinburgh's Waverley Gate building, the capital's former General Post Office.

== Core participants ==
At the first preliminary hearing on 6 October 2015, Lord Hardie revealed that the parties who had applied for and been granted core participant status were: Bilfinger Construction UK, Carillion Utility Services, City of Edinburgh Council, DLA Piper Scotland, Parsons Brinckerhoff, Scottish Ministers and Siemens.

The city council had decided not to revive its former arms-length transport firm Transport Initiatives Edinburgh (Tie), therefore the former company could not be designated a core participant.

== Evidence ==
It was initially estimated that the inquiry might examine more than two million digital files and 200 boxes of documents as evidence.

The hearings made use of large screens, to display documents as they were referred to during the proceedings.

Three expert witnesses gave evidence: Stuart Fair, CIPFA; Bent Flyvbjerg, Professor of Major Programme Management at the Saïd Business School at the University of Oxford; and David Rumney, consultant in light rail/tramway engineering.

== The report ==
In May 2023, it was confirmed that the final report had been completed and sent to the publishing company for printing, a process expected to take several weeks. The report was finally published in August 2023.

The report concluded that failings by the City of Edinburgh Council and its arms-length companies were to blame for the delays. Much of the criticism was directed against Transport Initiatives Edinburgh (TIE), the company that was initially in charge of the project. The report stated that TIE's failings were "the principal cause of the failure to deliver the project on time and within budget" but added that Edinburgh Council "must also share principal responsibility". Lord Hardie made 24 recommendations, and also provided a figure of £835.7m for the final cost of the project.

== Cost of the inquiry ==
In August 2015, City of Edinburgh Council announced that they expected to spend up to £2 million participating in the inquiry. The council spending would include the costs of legal assistance that would be provided to former councillors and staff.

By July 2016, the inquiry itself had cost £3.7m, £1.822m of this being staffing costs, and £716,000 being legal fees.

In June 2020, two years after the last public hearing, the estimated cost had risen to around £11m.

The Scottish Government stated in an FOI request for the remuneration paid to Lord Hardie; 'We are not able to provide details of amounts paid to Lord Hardie under the Data Protection Act'.

In September 2023, the final cost of the inquiry was reported to be "more than £13m".

== Criticism ==
As at November 2022, there was still no date for the publication of the report. Joanna Mowat, a Conservative councillor for Edinburgh city centre, said the delay was “nothing short of a scandal. “No one can understand why this is taking so long”.

== Bibliography ==
- Edinburgh Tram Inquiry Report (PDF). August 2023. ISBN 978-0-85759-155-5.
