= Transport Initiatives Edinburgh =

Tie Limited
- Type: Limited company, wholly owned by local government
- Industry: Public transport
- Founded: 2002
- Defunct: 2011
- Headquarters: Edinburgh, Scotland
- Area served: Lothian
- Key people: Richard Jeffrey, Chief Executive (2009–2011)
- Services: Project management, transport planning
- Owner: City of Edinburgh Council
- Website: Official website (archived)

Tie Ltd. (previously Transport Initiatives Edinburgh Ltd.) was a Scottish company which project-managed large-scale transport projects on behalf of the City of Edinburgh Council, which also owned it. The company was active between May 2002 and August 2011.

Tie was involved in numerous projects inside and in the vicinity of Edinburgh, including the Ingliston park and ride, the Stirling–Alloa–Kincardine rail link, and the cancelled Edinburgh congestion charge. However, the organisation would become most well known for its work on the Edinburgh Trams scheme, for which it project-managed and oversaw the appointing of contracts to external parties.

By 2008, the partially-constructed tramway had become controversial and Tie was being publicly criticised over its handling of the project. As both financial and schedule overruns on the tramway became increasingly severe, numerous senior figures chose to abruptly resign from Tie, particularly when contractor Bilfinger Berger chose to halt construction work entirely. During mid-2011, sweeping redundancies were enacted across the company and Tie was effectively dissolved later that year. In its place, Transport for Edinburgh has taken on numerous responsibilities it formerly undertook, including the tramway.

== History ==
Tie was established in 2002 as a move towards a public-private partnership (PPP) to improve Scottish public transport infrastructure development. It was structured as a private limited company, wholly owned by the City of Edinburgh Council, and was operated on a not-for-profit basis.

Despite the similar names, Tie had no connection with Transport Initiatives LLP, an English transport planning consultancy established in 2005 that specialises in active travel Active mobility (walking, wheeling, cycling and travel planning).

During June 2006, Willie Gallagher joined Tie as its executive chairman; he promptly enacted a reorganisation of the company.

In July 2007, preparatory work, including the diversion of underground utilities ahead of track-laying in Leith, started for the Edinburgh Trams scheme. This new tramway project, budgeted at £512 million, was initially managed by Tie, which had also overseen the awarding of the associated contracts. In May 2008, final contracts to build the tram system were awarded to BSC, a consortium of Bilfinger Berger, Siemens and Spanish tram builder Construcciones y Auxiliar de Ferrocarriles (CAF).

As early as 2008, both the under construction tramway and Tie itself was incurring criticism related to delayed infrastructure delivery and prolonging road closures, such as of Princes Street, which had caused economic disruption to several areas of the city. Numerous disputes broke out between the various contractors involved in the construction and Tie, some of which were so severe as to end up in court. Project overruns, both in terms of financial and schedule, were also at least in part attributed to Tie; the organisation having initially denied any such overruns although their reality later became apparent.

Amid this controversy, several organisational changes occurred at Tie. On 13 November 2008, Gallagher abruptly chose to step down as executive chairman amid heavy criticism of his handling of the tram project. He was replaced by David Mackay, then Chairman of Transport Edinburgh Limited, on an interim basis. In May 2009, Richard Jeffrey, the former managing director of Edinburgh Airport, was appointed as the new executive chairman of Tie. By December 2009, reported emerged that the tramway's cost was running £545 million over budget and that the system was unlikely to be operational until February 2012 or later.

During May 2011, by which point tramway contractor Bilfinger Berger had halted construction work completely and tensions over the future of Tie had only increased, Jeffrey resigned from the executive chairman position. Shortly after Jeffrey's resignation, four non-executive directors and the communications director also resigned.

In June 2011, a substantial restructuring of Tie was launched, the cornerstone of which being a voluntary redundancy scheme aimed at halving the company's total headcount. During August 2011, it was announced that further redundancies would be made and that Tie had been relieved of its responsibilities; in its place, an international consultancy, Turner & Townsend, had been appointed to support the Edinburgh Trams project. In the aftermath of this transfer, tramway contractor Bilfinger Berger spoke out about Tie's management of the scheme, expressing the view that Tie had exercised a poor risk management strategy and that it had failed to organise the necessary construction work to relocate various underground utilities prior to commencing construction of the tramway.

Amid the Edinburgh Trams controversy, Tie received heavily criticism from various parties for its handling of the project. During late 2011, Tie was disbanded as a company; Transport for Edinburgh took over responsibility for the Edinburgh Trams scheme from the defunct organisation. Initially, the company chose not to reveal the severance payments that had been awarded to its directors, however, following a Freedom of Information application, it was revealed that the directors of Tie had received compensation totalling £406,635 after they stepped down from the company. The company had also worked to reduce the tax incurred by several of its consultants.

== Projects ==
Tie was involved in several major transport projects in Scotland including:

	Project	Description	Status
Ingliston car park	Ingliston Park & Ride	a park and ride facility to be integrated with the Edinburgh tram system	Operational as a car park
"Stirling to Alloa and Kincardine railway under construction"	Stirling-Alloa-Kincardine rail link	Railway line from Stirling to Kincardine	Operational
	One-Ticket	A multi-modal ticketing system for south-east Scotland	Operational
Edinburgh guided bus	Edinburgh Fastlink	A guided bus system in the west of the city, opened in 2004 and closed in 2009 to be replaced with the Edinburgh Trams line.	Closed
Edinburgh Airport	Edinburgh Airport Rail Link (EARL)	Rail link connecting Edinburgh Airport with the main ScotRail network	Cancelled
traffic on Princes Street Edinburgh	Congestion charging	A project to introduce a congestion charge into Edinburgh	Rejected in referendum
Edinburgh tram	Edinburgh Trams	Construction of a new tramway in Edinburgh - Tie dismissed from project, August 2011	Open - limited scope
