= Edinburgh congestion charge =

Proposed congestion pricing scheme in Edinburgh, Scotland

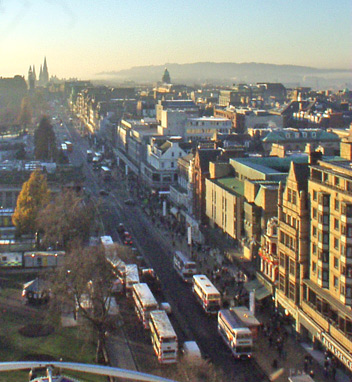
Princes Street - at the centre of the proposed city centre cordon

The Edinburgh congestion charge (also known as Edinburgh road tolls) was a proposed scheme of congestion pricing for Scotland's capital city. It planned to reduce congestion by introducing a daily charge to enter a cordon within the inner city, with the money raised directed to fund improvements in public transport. The scheme was the subject of intense public and political debate and ultimately rejected. A referendum was held and nearly three-quarters of respondents rejected the proposals.

== Background ==
Edinburgh's roads radiate from the city centre, which acts as a hub for other modes of transport and facilitates through-journeys. An outer by-pass circles the east, south and western boundaries of the city, but there is neither a northern by-pass nor a recognised inner ring road to take vehicular traffic. As of 2001, Edinburgh's public transport relied on buses and taxis; there were two major (and ten minor) city train stations, no light rail system, and the tram network had been decommissioned in the 1950s. The city centre straddles seven hills; there was an off-road cycle network although there were few dedicated routes in the city centre. City commuters could use Park and Ride schemes, or several bus companies, with the largest being Lothian Buses, formed in 2000 with The City of Edinburgh Council as its major shareholder, carrying 108 million passengers in 2006.

Edinburgh's economy had been growing over the last few decades, with 34,800 more jobs predicted to be generated in the city between 2006 and 2015. This has helped to drive the local growth of car use in Edinburgh, with daily commuting trips identified as having increased by 72% between 1981 and 2001. In 2000 more vehicle registrations occurred in Edinburgh than anywhere else in Scotland. Congestion in the city was predicted to rise a further 25% between 2006 and 2026.

Edinburgh's road network was also in need of extensive repair and refurbishment; although maintenance had been increased to £16m per annum, the backlog of outstanding work was estimated at £70m.

Traffic delays and the impacts of road congestion had been estimated to cost the local economy about £20billion a year. Although its air quality was generally good, parts of Edinburgh suffered from high concentrations of nitrogen oxides (NOx), mostly emitted from vehicle exhausts. Minor traffic management changes were planned to reduce this by 5% in the worst-affected areas, but an overall 40% reduction was targeted, partly by introducing a low emission zone to restrict heavy goods vehicles, partly through improved vehicle standards, and the rest through Edinburgh's 'Integrated Transport Initiative', with journeys moving to public transport as a result of congestion charging. To improve public transport, the city also considered opening up existing railway lines, currently used for freight, to carry new passenger trains, and a new tram line in South East Edinburgh.

In summary, Edinburgh Council was faced with increasing issues with private and public transport, yet it had limited options, and a challenging set of finances, being limited to its annual transportation budget, along with monies collected from parking charges.

Meanwhile, the Westminster Parliament passed legislation expanding the range of possible methods of taxation for roads in the UK, notably allowing for local authorities to introduce local road use pricing schemes. Durham introduced the first British scheme during 2002, followed by the London congestion charge in 2003, introduced under new powers granted to the Mayor of London, Ken Livingstone.

Edinburgh chose to participate in the Department for Transport's Charging Development Partnership of local authorities working considering congestion charging or workplace parking levies, and also part-funded the European Union's PRoGR€SS project ('Pricing Road use for Greater Responsibility, Efficiency and Sustainability') to demonstrate and evaluate the effectiveness and acceptance of urban road pricing schemes, under the EU's CUPID European Road Pricing initiative.

== Proposals ==
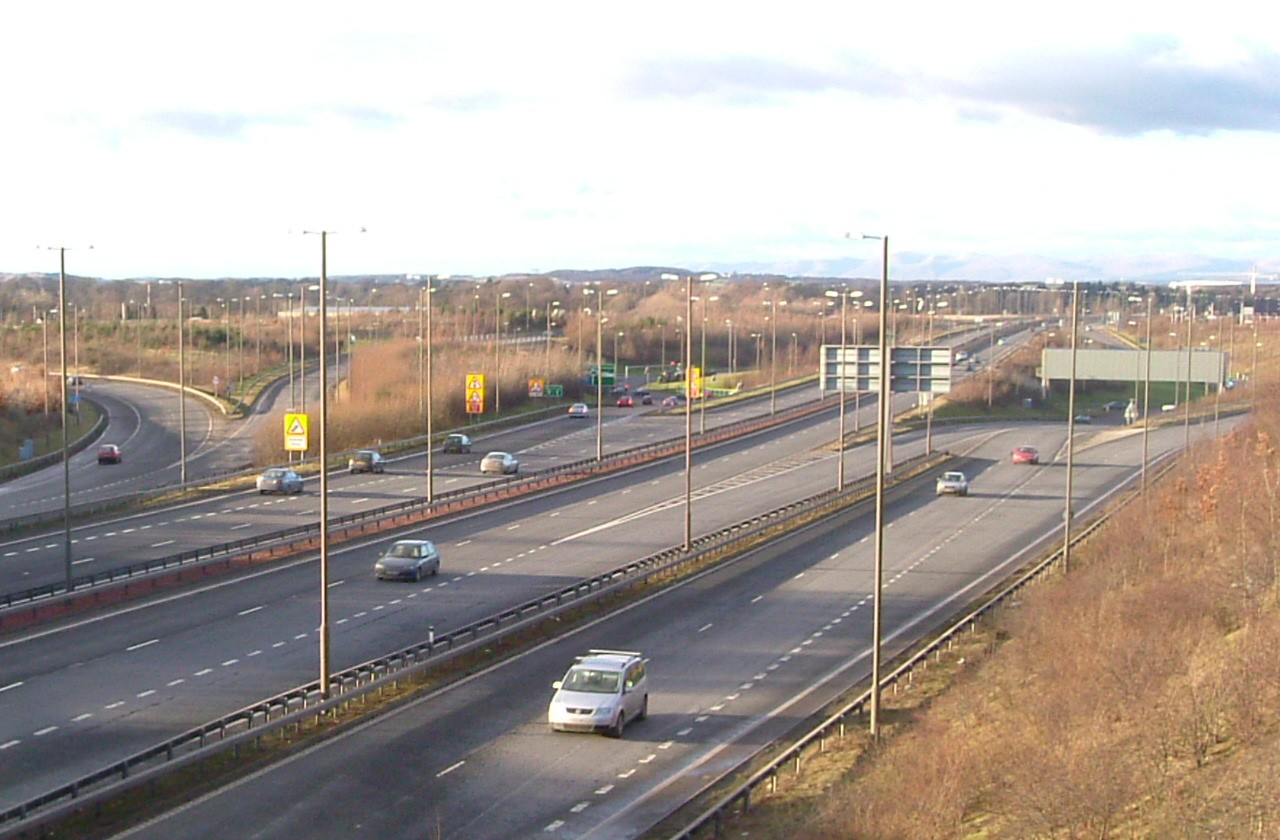
The Edinburgh City Bypass junction with the M8 motorway which was one of the cordons for the proposed congestion charge.

The Transport (Scotland) Act 2001 made Scottish road pricing schemes possible, and laid down the condition that all proceeds from such schemes must be spent on transport. In 2002 the City of Edinburgh Council began a consultation on future options for transport in Edinburgh. Three options were presented:

- a two cordon congestion charge,
- a one cordon congestion charge, or
- do nothing.

The scheme was seen as a possible blueprint for other areas in Scotland, with Glasgow, Aberdeen and Dundee awaiting the outcome of the Edinburgh scheme before making their own proposals.

The initial plans envisaged a charging scheme that operated in the city centre between 0700 and 1900, Monday to Friday, starting in 2006. The intention was to use similar technologies to the London scheme, with automatic number plate recognition systems to record vehicles passing the cordon boundaries, and fines issued to those who had not paid using the Driver and Vehicle Licensing Agency database to trace vehicles. Pre payment would be allowed as well as payment at a number of locations. Vehicles would be charged £2 to pass one of the two cordons. One would be at the Edinburgh City Bypass and the other surrounding the city centre. There would be only one charge to enter the city centre, even if both cordons were passed or cordons were passed several times in one day. It was also proposed to block off side roads to stop rat running.

An all-day scheme was initially projected to raise around £900 million for a central cordon only and £1.5 billion for the dual cordon option. Subject to public approval, the charge would have started in 2006, following various transport improvements. A two cordon scheme was expected to reduce congestion by up to 15% overall, with a drop of up to 85,000 journeys per day. It was projected to reduce volumes by 18 per cent in the centre and 15 per cent in the west. A one cordon scheme was projected to remove 59,000 journeys in the city centre, although there would be a small increase in the west. The cost for setting up the congestion charge was estimated at £11million for the two cordon option and £8million for the city centre cordon only proposal.

Later in 2002 the council stated they would look at various options for residents' discounts, potentially discounting the charge to 20p for those eligible. In September 2002, the council confirmed the initial proposals with some variations. The outer cordon was now proposed to operate between 0700-1000 and 1600 to 1830, and the inner cordon from 0700 to 1830, although these modifications would reduce the revenues available to provide the promised transport improvements. In 2003 the concessions were reported to be worth £58million, reducing the funding for transport improvements to £900million. Costs for preparing the scheme at the end of 2003 were estimated to be £5.36million and that the council would not proceed with the scheme as a Public-private partnership. Transport Initiatives Edinburgh announced £435million for public transport schemes outside of the Edinburgh council area.

A consultation was initially sent to over 250,000 people in the city and surrounding areas. Neighbouring West Lothian Council were against the scheme, and sent out 72,000 newsletters to its businesses and residents, criticising the scheme. Fife Council were also concerned about its fairness on the residents of neighbouring areas who contributed to the Edinburgh economy, but had been priced out of the city by the high cost of living, and planned a study into the impact of Edinburgh's scheme on Fife. Some political parties and central city traders were skeptical of the projected economics, claiming that shoppers would drive to other out of town destinations such as McArthur Glen in Livingston, shifting business away from Edinburgh. They noted that the circumstances were different from London's, which is so large that the impact upon retail and business would be less significant. Edinburgh council then sought public feedback and re-evaluated parts of the scheme's operation.

A public enquiry opened on 27 April 2004 and lasted ten weeks. The inquiry report broadly supported the Edinburgh council's proposals, but recommended removing some of the exemptions proposed and allowing payment the day after. It also expressed concern at the implementation timetable along with the likelihood of receiving the required public transport improvements. Costs for preparing the scheme were now estimated at £8.1million. The costs were shared on a 50% basis with the Scottish Executive.

The council also proposed to introduce traffic calming measures including speed humps, road closures, and one way roads to stop rat running by drivers trying to avoid the congestion charge.

The final proposals had the outer cordon operating during the morning rush hour with the inner one from 0700 to 1830, both from Monday to Friday.

At this stage, the council said that the scheme would raise around £50 million a year to fund improvements in public transport, amounting to £760m over 20 years. It was hoped that this money would fund a range of new transport projects:

- 3 tram networks serving north, west, and south east Edinburgh
- 5 or 6 Park & Ride sites around Edinburgh
- new rail services, reopening of some former passenger service routes in Edinburgh, and new links to Fife, East and West Lothian
- more frequent bus services and new orbital bus routes
- improvements at major transport interchanges
- live information displays at bus stops and other public places
- city centre environmental and pedestrian improvements
- an expansion of bicycle routes
- 20 mph speed limits and traffic calming across all residential areas
- road maintenance

== Reaction ==
When the initial consultation was launched, there was initial opposition and support for a congestion charge scheme. Transform Scotland, a transport pressure group, supported the two cordon scheme. Friends of the Earth Scotland also welcomed the proposals as they believed they would reduce air pollution and improve the city environment. The Princes Street association opposed the scheme, stating that businesses in the city centre would be put at a competitive disadvantage. Two public surveys in March 2002 had shown opposition to a charging scheme from 75% of suburban Edinburgh residents and 64% across the whole city. Scottish Executive support was anticipated, but the Executive stated that it was up to local authorities to propose schemes. The AA Scotland stated its opposition to the scheme. The hospitality industry supported the scheme, subject to improved public transport. Fife Council announced a report into the impact onto their area, whilst West Lothian Council opposed the outer cordon as a penalty on commuters into Edinburgh. Concern was also expressed that the DVLA would not be able to trace 1 in 12 of those not paying.

The proposals became part of the political debate in Scotland. The Scottish Conservatives argued that the scheme was not about congestion but about raising money and the Scottish National Party campaigned against the charge and made it an issue in the 2003 local elections. The Scottish Greens supported the congestion charge. The ruling Scottish Labour Party lost a significant number of votes at a September 2002 council by election (slipping from second to fourth place) with participants claiming that the proposed congestion charge had been a factor. On Edinburgh City Council, the opposition parties of the Scottish Conservatives, Scottish Liberal Democrats and the Scottish National Party all opposed the plans. The Liberal Democrats had supported road charging in the Scottish Parliament. The Scottish Transport Minister, Iain Gray, announced government support in principle for the scheme in December 2002, subject to the residents of Edinburgh supporting the scheme. A referendum was offered by the city council, which unlike the original consultation, would be restricted to the residents of the City of Edinburgh council area.

The councils surrounding Edinburgh - West Lothian, Fife and Midlothian - opposed the scheme. Mid Lothian circulated leaflets encouraging their residents to actively oppose the plans. In February 2005, these three councils were permitted to bring a petition to have the scheme declared unlawful in the Court of Session. They argued that the concessions for residents of the Edinburgh council area who lived further away than some of their residents from the capital, made the scheme unfair. Further they also asked for a declaration that the City of Edinburgh council had acted unlawfully in not taking on board the recommendations of the public enquiry and that there were not legal powers to fund public transport beyond the city boundaries. Scottish Borders Council also opposed the scheme and wanted the referendum extended to their residents.

Following the introduction of the London congestion charge, Professor David Begg, chair of the Commission for Integrated Transport, cited the reported of that success as a reason to go ahead with the Edinburgh scheme. Two groups were set up to campaign for the introduction of the charge and a yes vote in the referendum, Yes to Edinburgh and Get Edinburgh Moving. Opposed to the charge were Edinburgh Communities Against Congestion Charging, retail businesses and the National Alliance Against Tolls.

The John Lewis Partnership, owners of a department store in central Edinburgh, called for reduced charging hours in the city centre to reduce the impact on retail shops and improvements to the public transport system before the charge began. The Edinburgh Chamber of Commerce was joined by the Freight Transport Association in requesting that all commercial vehicles be exempted, arguing that businesses would have to pass on their increased costs to consumers or leave the city altogether. An early 2004 survey by the Chamber of Commerce had 90% of respondents rejecting the proposed scheme with two-thirds against road pricing as a matter of principle.

Initial results from the consultation showed that amongst respondents half supported a city centre cordon, but 44% supported the outer cordon. Concern was expressed on rat runs and local air quality in parts of north Edinburgh if only a city centre cordon was introduced. A survey organised by Mid Lothian council showed 98% of residents were opposed to the scheme. In the run up to the referendum, the council proposed an independent monitoring board for the scheme and possible abolition after two years if it did not work.

== Referendum ==
Edinburgh congestion charge
- 7–21 February 2005
- The leaflet enclosed with this ballot paper gives information on the Council's transport proposals for Edinburgh. The Council's 'preferred' strategy includes congestion charging and increased transport investment funded by it. Do you support the Council's 'preferred' strategy?

Results
Choice	Votes	%
Yes	45,965	25.59%
No	133,678	74.41%
Registered voters/turnout		61.7%

A referendum was organised by the City of Edinburgh Council and conducted by postal ballot from 7 February 2005 until 21 February 2005. The referendum cost £600,000.

The question asked in the Edinburgh road tolls referendum was:

"The leaflet enclosed with this ballot paper gives information on the Council's transport proposals for Edinburgh. The Council's 'preferred' strategy includes congestion charging and increased transport investment funded by it. Do you support the Council's 'preferred' strategy?"

There was concern that the referendum forms were confusing. A dedicated council help line received 943 calls in one day. There were complaints that the question was biased, referring to the council's "preferred" strategy and there were concerns expressed by some political parties that the information leaflet enclosed with the form would also add to the confusion. Around 30,000 residents who had stated a preference not to receive junk mail on the electoral register form could not be sent a ballot form.

On 22 February 2005 the result was announced, with the majority rejecting the proposals. With a turnout of 61.7% (179,643 votes) from a potential electorate of 300,000, there were 133,678 votes against and 45,965 in favour. The rejections amounted to 74.4% of the votes cast.

NO vote	YES vote
133,678	45,965

Against : 133,678 (74.4%)	In Favour : 45,965 (25.6%)
▲

Turnout	Total votes cast
61.7%	179,643

== Aftermath ==
The council accepted the results of the referendum and did not implement their proposals. A final bill of £9million was put on the development of the proposals.

The House of Commons select committee on transport suggested that the rejection of the scheme would delay plans to introduce other schemes in the United Kingdom.

Although the costs of the public transport schemes are still politically contentious at a local and Scottish level, the council continued to spend money on the Edinburgh tram network, buses, and new park and ride schemes.

In retrospect, Transport Initiatives Edinburgh noted that, although there was agreement that congestion needed to be contained, there had been clear public opposition to the concept of road pricing as a direct traffic restraint measure. The failure to achieve support they attributed to a range of factors:

- lack of consistent political will
- a distrust of the motives of the authority
- an absence of a powerful champion for the scheme
- significant stakeholder opposition
- a commitment to a popular referendum
- a difference in perception between the 'transport professionals' and the stakeholders. Edinburgh's scheme designers were attempting to introduce a road pricing mechanism as a proxy for making road users pay the full marginal cost for their journeys, while public opinion was that congestion came about because the alternatives to car travel were not viable, yet the schemes showed no commitments to investment in alternatives before road pricing would start.

== See also ==
- Motoring taxation in the United Kingdom
- Manchester congestion charge
- Durham City congestion charge
