= Ingliston =

Area of Edinburgh, Scotland

Coordinates: 55°56′22.10″N 3°22′21.01″W

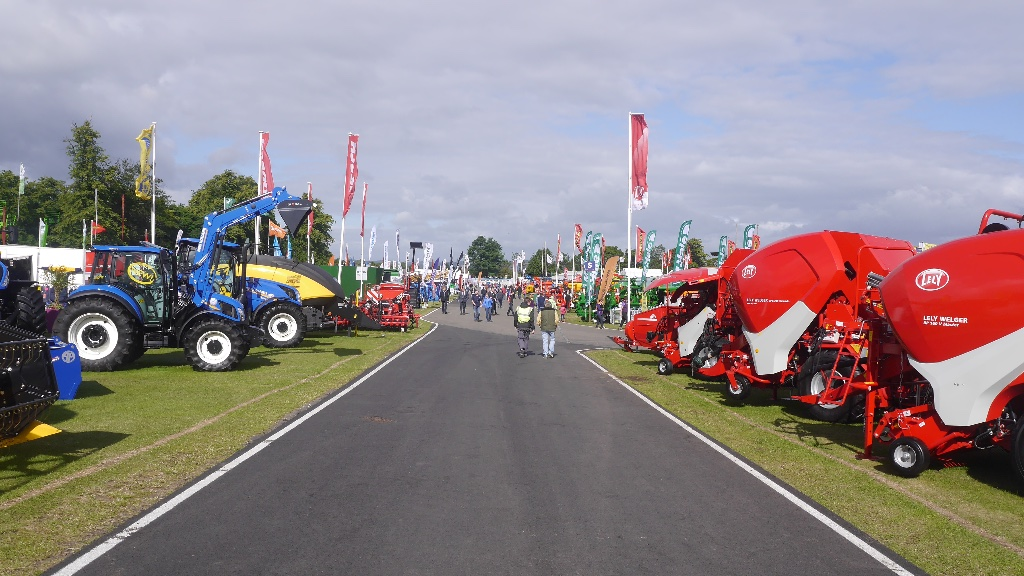
Machinery exhibits, Royal Highland Showground

Ingliston (/ˈɪŋɡəlstən/; Scots: Inglistoun) is an area in the west of Edinburgh, Scotland. It is near to Maybury, South Gyle and Newbridge.

It is home to Edinburgh Airport and The Royal Highland Showground.

== History ==
The name Ingliston either means the "settlement of the Inglis Family" or "English town".

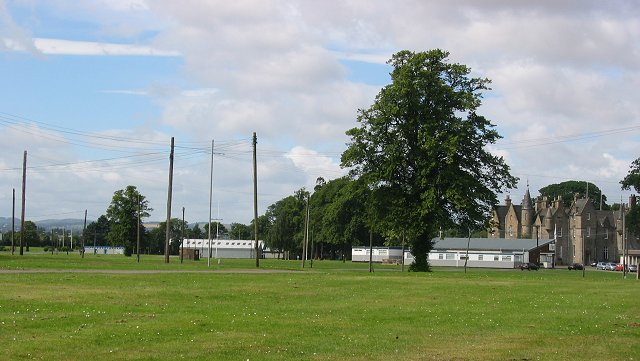
Ingliston House

From 1965 to 1994 motor racing took place at Ingliston Racing Circuit, which was located within the Royal Highland Showground.

From 1973 to 2005, a Sunday market was held at Ingliston. It was one of the biggest open air markets in Europe. For many years, a feature of the market was a 5.5-metre-tall (18 ft) statue of King Kong by Nicholas Monro.

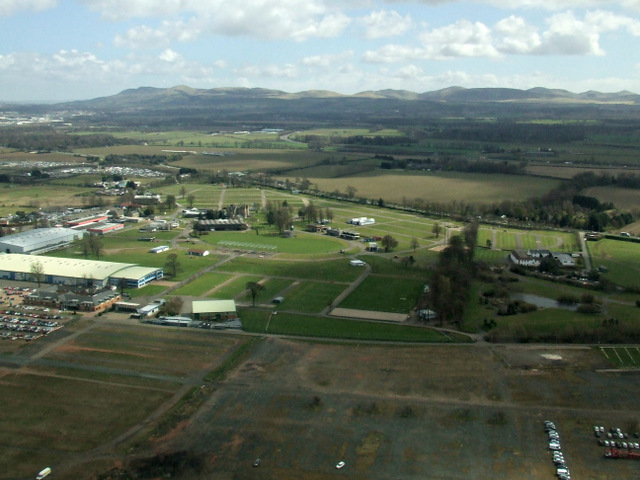
Ingliston market and showground from the air

Ingliston Golf Club first appeared in the 1930s. The 18-hole parkland course closed in the 1960s and is now the site of the Royal Highland Show Ground.

== Park and Ride ==
Ingliston Park and Ride (P&R) opened in 2006. It is the most westerly of seven parks and rides in and around Edinburgh. It offers free parking with 1085 spaces. Parking is prohibited between 2:00 am and 4:00 am.

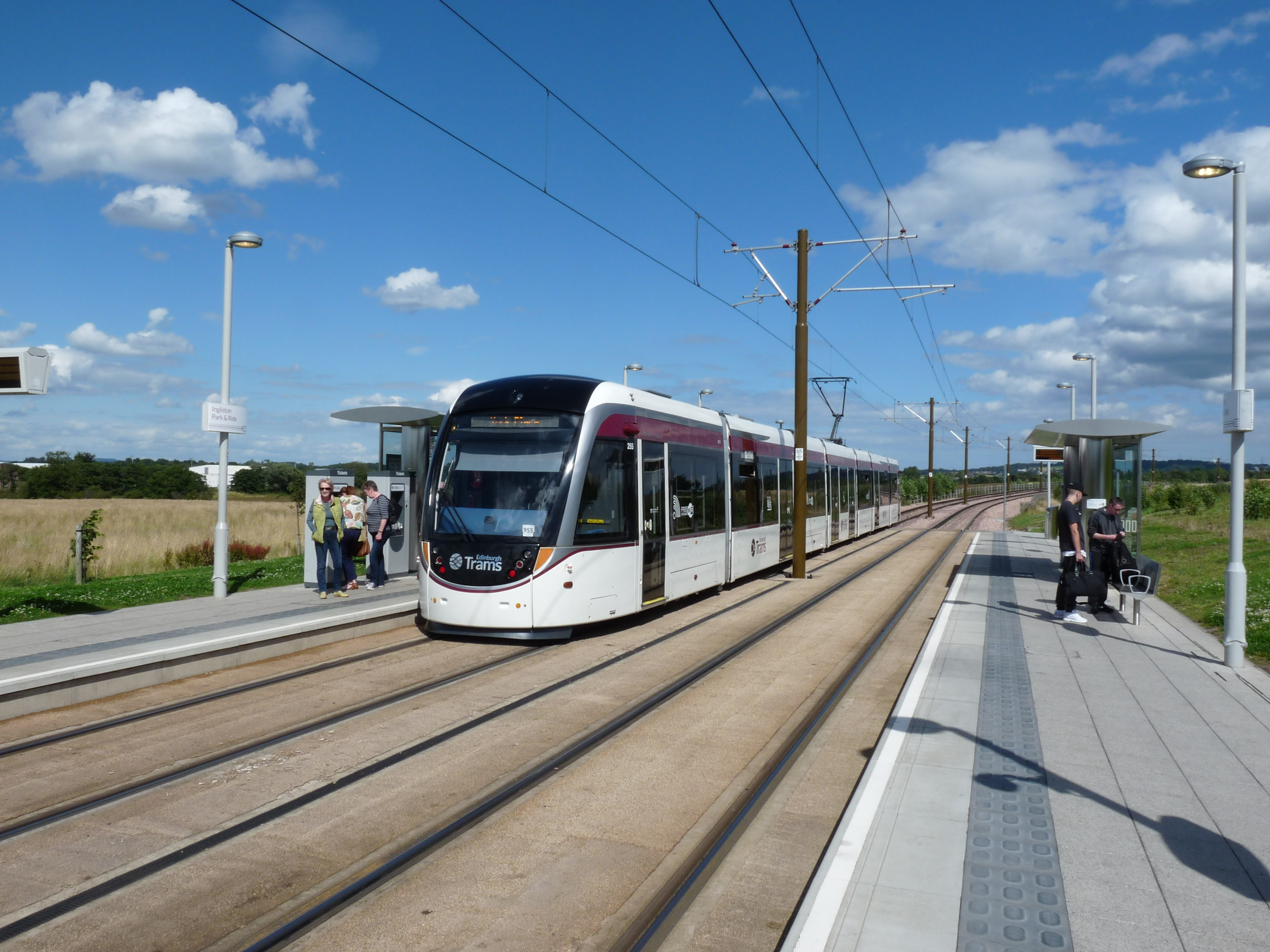
Ingliston P&R tram stop

=== Buses ===
Lothian Buses services 17 and 18 serve the park & ride. In addition Ember service E1 serves the park and ride with services to Edinburgh, Dundee and Aberdeen. Flixbus also service the park and ride with services to Edinburgh, Glasgow, Aberdeen and Inverness.

=== Tram ===
Ingliston Park and Ride light rail tram stop opened in May 2014, and is operated by Edinburgh Trams.

Preceding station	Edinburgh Trams	Following station
Gogarburn towards Newhaven	Newhaven - Edinburgh Airport	Edinburgh Airport; Terminus
