= Pedal on Parliament =

UK advocacy group

Pedal on Parliament is a volunteer-run group that campaigns for better conditions for active travel in Scotland. Its main aim is to make Scotland a safer place for cyclists and walkers of all ages. Set up in 2012, it organises an annual mass bike-ride through central Edinburgh to the Parliament. In several years since 2015, simultaneous rides have been organised in other Scottish cities.

After a couple of years with no event, the most recent Pedal on Parliament was held on Saturday 30 May 2026.

== Manifesto ==
The campaign's eight-point manifesto aims to make Scotland a more cycle-friendly nation:

1. Proper funding for cycling
2. Design cycling into Scotland’s roads
3. Safer speeds where people live, work and play
4. Integrate cycling into local transport strategies
5. Sensible road traffic law and enforcement
6. Reduce the risk of HGVs to cyclists and pedestrians
7. A strategic and joined-up programme of road user training
8. Solid research on cycling to support policy-making

== Pedal on Parliament ride ==
The group's main activity is an annual mass-participation bike ride through the centre of Edinburgh, ending at the Scottish Parliament, where speeches are given by activists, politicians and others. For the first eight years, the ride started at The Meadows but in 2023 the start point was changed to Chambers Street. The route follows George IV Bridge and the Royal Mile, these roads being closed to general traffic during the event. The ride proceeds at a leisurely pace, with many children, some on balance bikes, taking part as well as pedestrians walking alongside. It is mainly policed by Edinburgh-based police officers on bikes.

A minute's silence has been held at these rides, to remember those cyclists who have been killed on the roads. In contrast, ringing of bike bells has also been used to celebrate cycling, and to signal agreement with speakers.

=== Feeder rides ===
Feeder rides are organised from various locations around Edinburgh and beyond to allow cyclists to travel to the start of the main ride in a group. There have also been guided ride from the parliament back to the Meadows along quiet streets after the main event.

== History ==
Pedal on Parliament was set up in 2012, partly in response to the death of Andrew McNicoll, and to protest at the lack of investment in cycling. There had previously been no national cycling campaign for Scotland. After the success of its first mass-participation ride, the group decided to continue its work and to organise further rides in subsequent years. The group now takes part in Scottish Parliament's Cross-Party group on cycling. For the first time since 2012, there was no event in 2024.

=== Inaugural 2012 event ===
The first ride took place on Saturday 28 April 2012, with between 2,500 and 3,000 people taking part. After gathering at the Meadows, a two-minute silence was held, and the ride was led off by the noted long-distance cyclist, Mark Beaumont. At the end of the ride, a petition with 3,000 signatures was delivered to the parliament. This event had followed several meetings between Government and road safety professionals and campaigners.

=== 2013 event ===
The second event was held on Sunday 19 May 2013. The procession of 4,000 cyclists was led by the families of Audrey Fyfe and Andrew McNicoll who were both killed while cycling in Edinburgh. as well as the athlete Graeme Obree. Paul Wheelhouse, Minister for Environment and Climate Change, received the campaign's eight-point manifesto.

=== 2014 event ===
The third Pedal on Parliament was held on 26 April 2014, and was the largest so far, with an estimated 4,500 people taking part. The event had started at midday to allow for football match traffic later in the day and the Great Edinburgh Run the following day.

Speeches were introduced by David Brennan, one of the organisers, and began with the views from three children, which were followed by speeches by a number of MSPs and campaign leaders:

- Daniel, Kyle, and Katharine: children who explained they wanted to cycle, but couldn't because of the lack of safe infrastructure and the dangerous roads between their house and school
- Keith Brown MSP, Minister for Transport (SNP), who remarked that "this was the largest demonstration we have seen outside parliament"
- Alison Johnstone MSP, Lothian (Green)
- Willie Rennie MSP, Mid Scotland and Fife (Lib Dem)
- Claudia Beamish MSP, South Scotland (Labour)
- Councillor Cameron Rose, Edinburgh (Conservative)
- Lynne McNicoll from the charity Andrew Cyclist
- Chris Oliver from Road Share spoke about the campaign for presumed liability

Several other MSPs and councillors, primarily from Edinburgh and the surrounding area, attended the event.

=== 2015 event ===
The fourth event was held on Saturday 25 April 2015. Transport Minister Derek Mackay attended, along with representatives of all the main political parties.

Speeches were again held outside the Parliament, following a minute's silence for those who had been killed on the roads.

- Briana Pegado, President of the Edinburgh University Students' Association
- Emilia Hanna, Friends of the Earth
- Derek Mackay MSP, Minister for Transport and Islands, announced "record breaking" funding for cycling in 2015/16
- Cameron Buchanan MSP, Conservative
- Sarah Boyack MSP, Labour
- Alison Johnstone MSP, Green
- Bruce Whitehead, Left Unity candidate

==== Pedal on Marischal, Aberdeen ====
A simultaneous ride was held in Aberdeen, from Hazlehead Park to Marischal College, to increase the profile of cycling in the city. Around 150 people gathered at the headquarters of Aberdeen City Council and were met by councilors from several political parties.

=== 2016 event ===
A fifth mass ride was held on 23 April 2016, during the run-up to the Scottish parliamentary elections, with a main ride in Edinburgh and a simultaneous ride in Aberdeen. The Edinburgh ride was attended by the leaders of three political parties: Kezia Dugdale, Willie Rennie and Patrick Harvie. It was the second year that Derek Mackay, Scotland's Minister for Transport, had taken part.

=== 2017 events ===
In 2017, rides were held over two days, with events in Edinburgh, Aberdeen and Glasgow being initially announced. A ride in Inverness was announced later.

In Aberdeen around 100 cyclists joined the ride, while around 120 people took part in the Inverness ride.

=== 2018 events ===
In 2018, the main ride in Edinburgh took place on 28 April, leaving from the Meadows at midday. A ride was held in Inverness on the same day. On the following day, a ride in Aberdeen went from Hazlehead Park to Union Street. A decision was made by the organizers not to hold a ride in Glasgow in 2018.

=== 2019 events ===
No main ride to the Scottish Parliament was planned for 2019. Instead, some twenty smaller-scale local events were organised for the weekend of 26 to 28 April. For the first time there was an event in Dundee. In Glasgow there was an event calling for a safe pedestrian crossing area at Victoria Park. An event at Bearsden was intended to raise pressure for the completion of the "Bears Way" cycle route.

=== 2021 events ===
In 2021 the theme was Light up Scotland, with cyclists being encouraged to undertake actions in the evening and light their bikes up, in particular highlighting the message, 'This machine fights Climate Change'. For the 2021 United Nations Climate Change Conference (COP26), a mass ride was organised as part of the COP Global Day of Action March in Glasgow on 6 November with the theme being Pedal on COP.

=== 2022 event ===
The 2022 ride took place Saturday 23 April. On this occasion the ride began at Chambers Street.

=== 2023 event ===
The 2023 ride took place on Saturday 22 April, again beginning from Chambers Street. A group of cyclists came from Glasgow, including friends of 22-year-old Emma Burke Newman, who was killed while cycling in Glasgow earlier that year. The benefits of the Blackford Safe Routes school bike bus was also highlighted by some of the children who cycle to school in it.

=== 2026 event ===
In January 2026, the organisers announced the event would return on Saturday 26 May, with a route from the Meadows to the Parliament on closed roads. More than a thousand cyclists from across Scotland participated.

A series of short speeches were given at the parliament from:

- Rose Marie Burke, mother of Emma Burke Newman who was killed while cycling in Glasgow in January 2023 by an HGV driver who encroached into the advance stop "bike box".
- Kate Campbell the SNP MSP for Edinburgh Eastern, Musselburgh and Tranent.
- Patrick Harvie, Scottish Greens MSP for Glasgow (region).
- Sanne Dijsktra-Downie, Liberal Democrat MSP for Edinburgh Northern.
