= Spokes (Lothian) =

Spokes, the Lothian Cycle Campaign, was started in Edinburgh, Scotland, in 1977 to campaign for better facilities for cyclists.

One of its first campaigns was for cycling to be allowed on Middle Meadow Walk (through The Meadows). After initial opposition, Edinburgh Corporation agreed. Since then Edinburgh's councils have gradually increased on and off-road facilities to encourage cycling. Pressure has been kept up by Spokes and its members.

Spokes has been actively involved in Safe Routes to School projects since 1996.

Spokes also publishes a cycle map for Edinburgh, and others for surrounding council areas.
