= Transport for Edinburgh =

Organisation that oversees public transport in Edinburgh, Scotland

- Abbreviation: TfE
- Headquarters: 55 Annandale Street; Edinburgh; EH7 4AZ
- Region served: Edinburgh; Lothian
- Chairman: Lesley Macinnes
- Main organ: Edinburgh Trams; Lothian Buses
- Parent organisation: City of Edinburgh Council
- Website: transportforedinburgh.com

Transport for Edinburgh (TfE) was an organisation that oversaw public transport in Edinburgh, Scotland. It managed the city's public transport operations in a similar manner to Transport for London, but with many fewer powers. The organisation worked to integrate public transport services in Edinburgh operated by Edinburgh Trams, Lothian Buses and McGill’s Midland Bluebird. It focused solely on buses and trams during its first twelve months and later included cycles. The formation of the organisation was announced on 15 August 2013, by Edinburgh transport convener and former Lord Provost of Edinburgh Lesley Hinds.

The body held the City of Edinburgh Council's 91% stake in Lothian Buses, and its 100% stake in Edinburgh Trams. It has been reported that TfE was the tenth largest employer in Edinburgh. The board of directors of the body was chaired by Lesley Hinds. She was joined on the board by Jim McFarlane, Charlene Wallace, Steve Cassidy and city councillors Karen Doran, Claire Miller and Callum Laidlaw. Former non-executive directors have included solicitor Ann Faulds and transport specialist Tony Depledge.

TfE did not have a separate office, but instead utilised the offices of Lothian Buses. Its logo was revealed on 17 December 2013.

Transport for Edinburgh was renamed Edinburgh Transport Holdings in December 2025 as part of a City of Edinburgh Council plan to merge Lothian Buses and Edinburgh Trams. It now functions solely as a holding company, with its board of directors responsible for all three companies.

== See also ==
- Transport in Edinburgh
- Proposals for new tram lines in Edinburgh
- SESTRAN
