= Kilmarnock =

Burgh in East Ayrshire, Scotland

Coordinates: 55.61106°N 4.49571°W

Kilmarnock: Scottish Gaelic: Cille Mheàrnaig; Scots: Kilmaurnock
- Administrative centre, town and former burgh
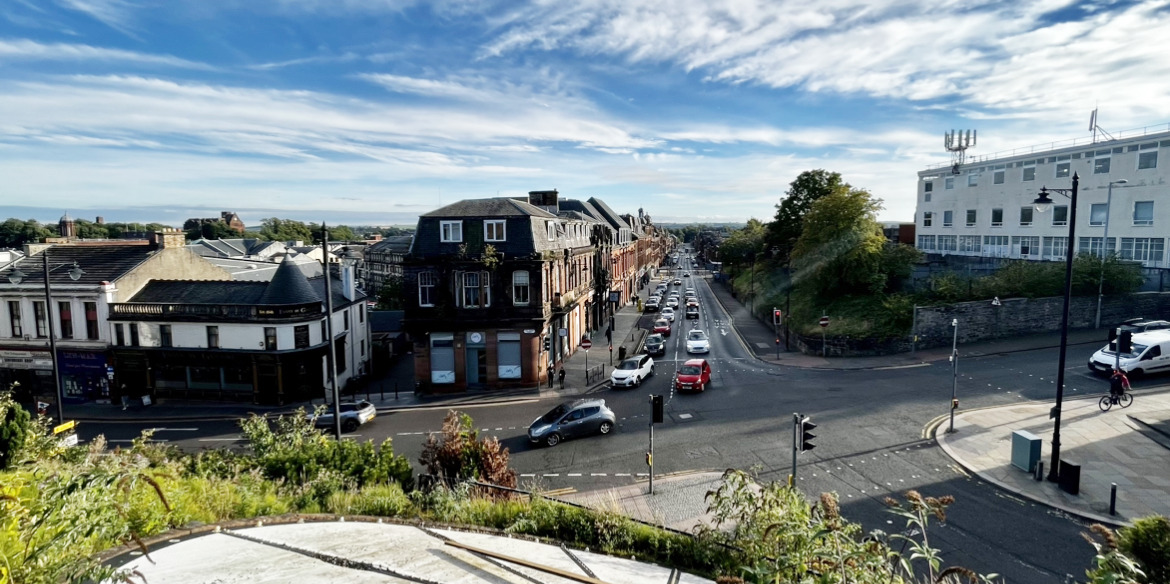
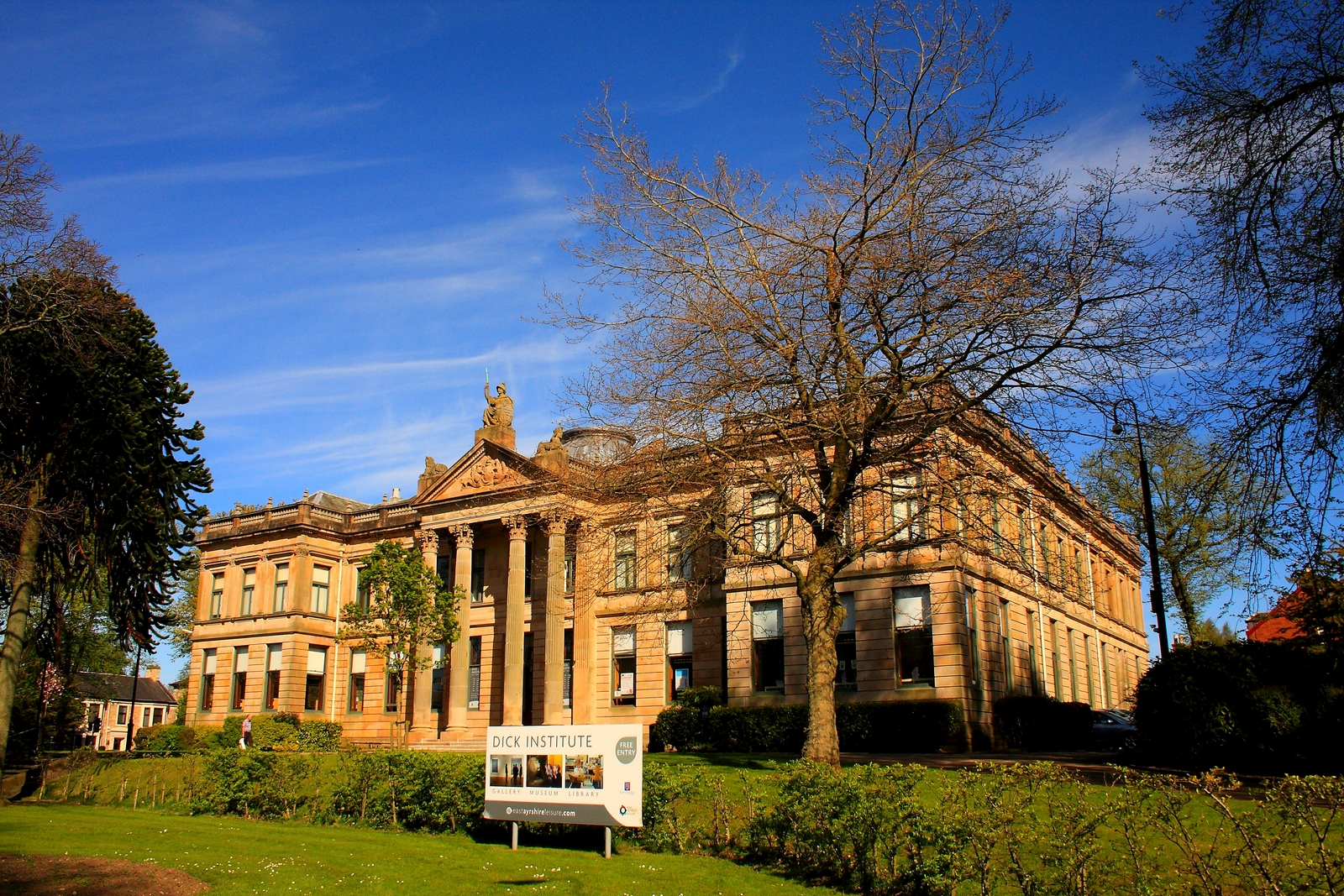
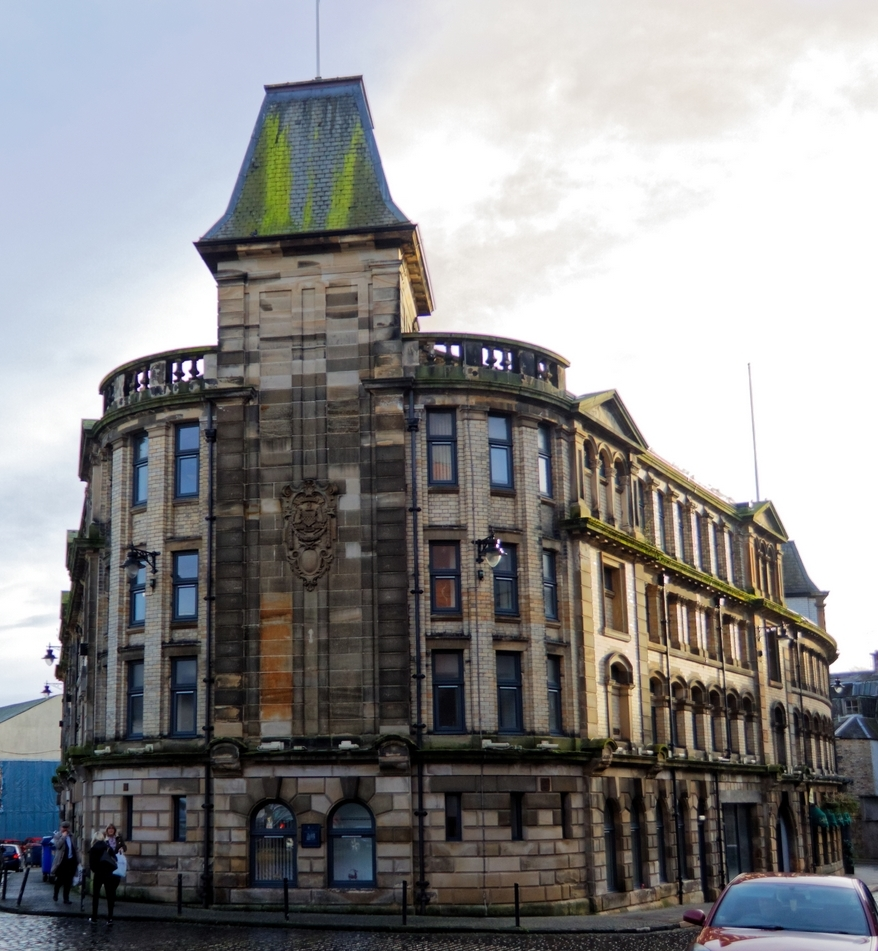
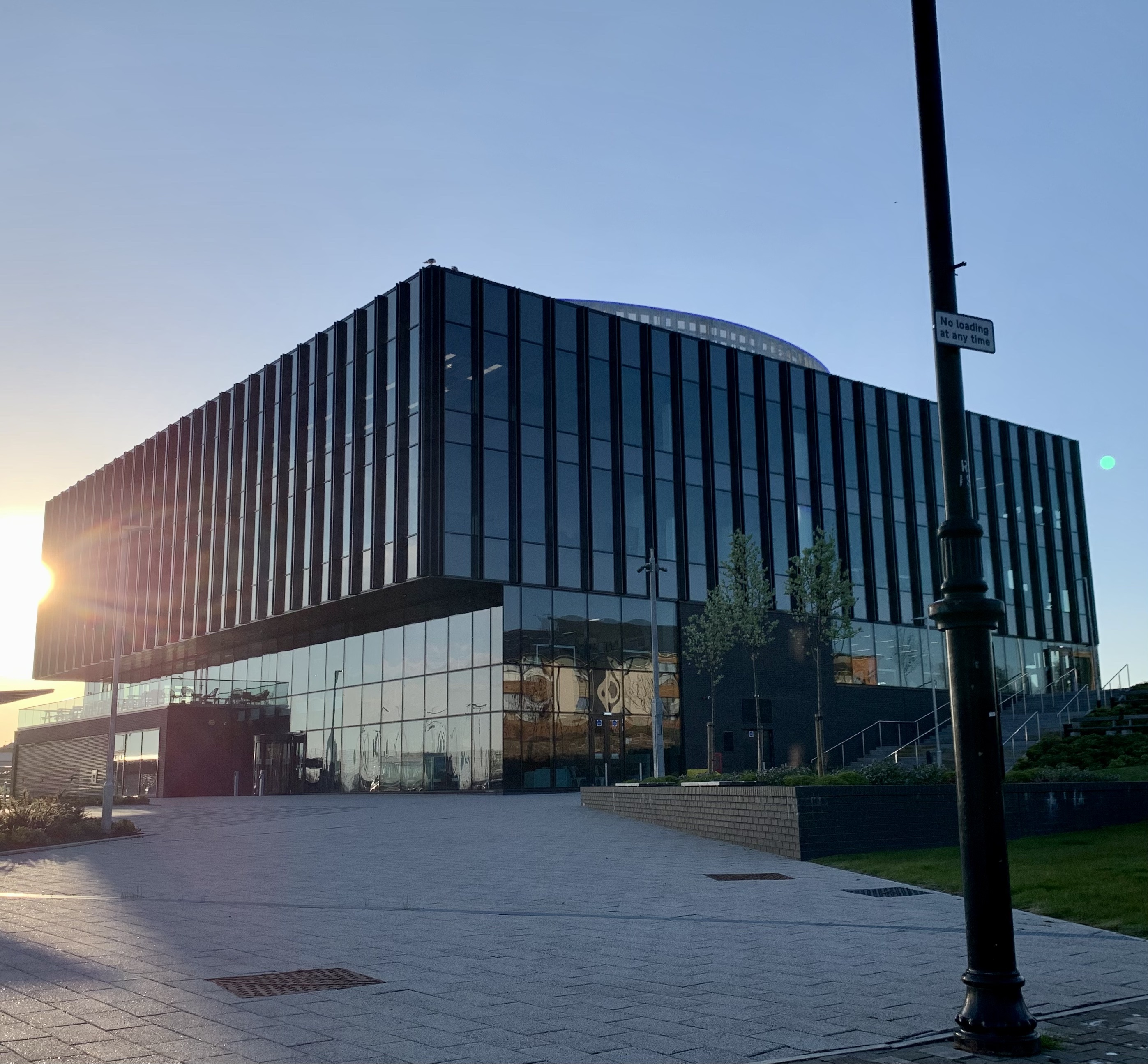
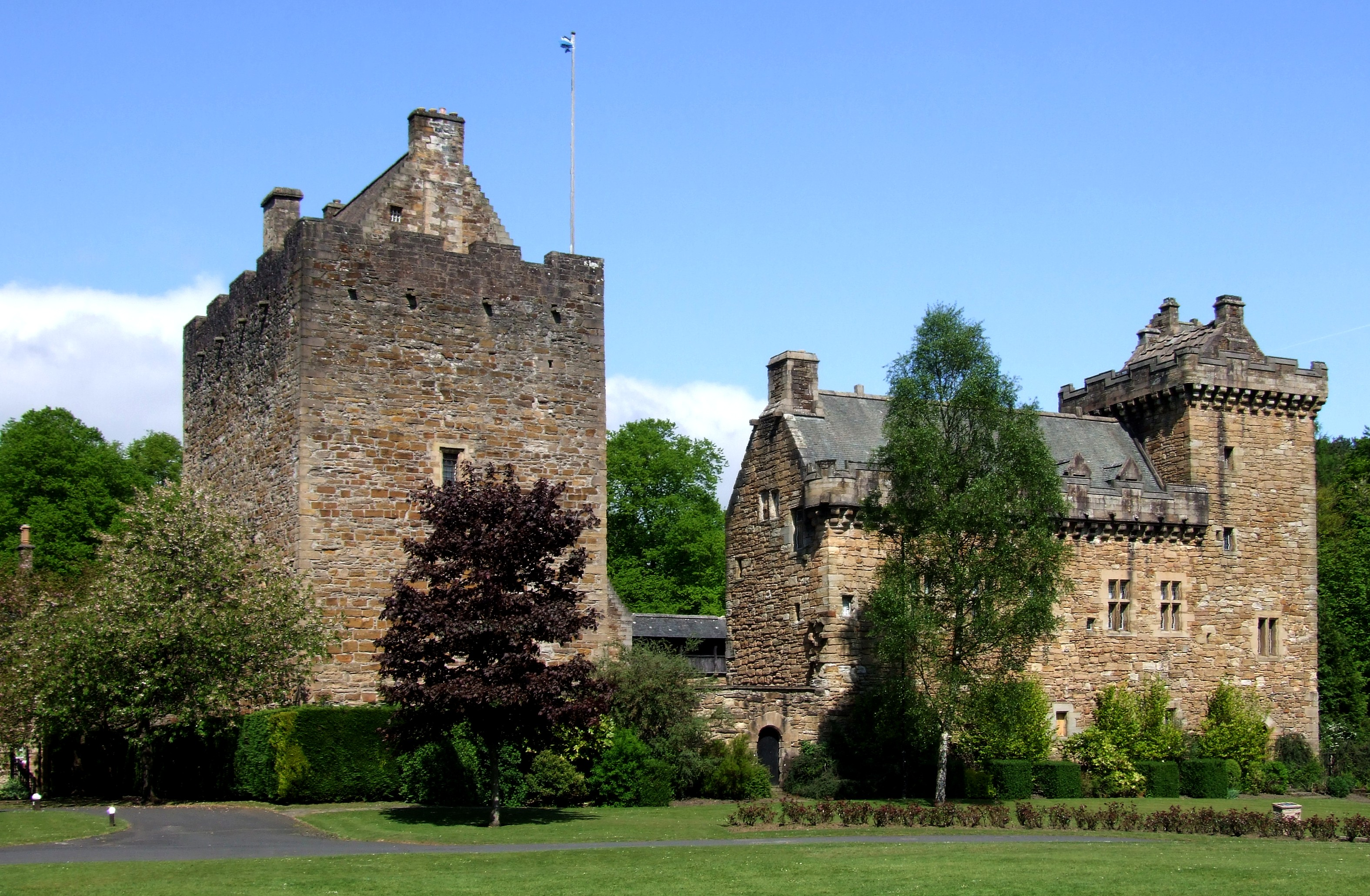
- Skyline of Kilmarnock Dick Institute Johnnie Walker Bond The Halo Dean Castle

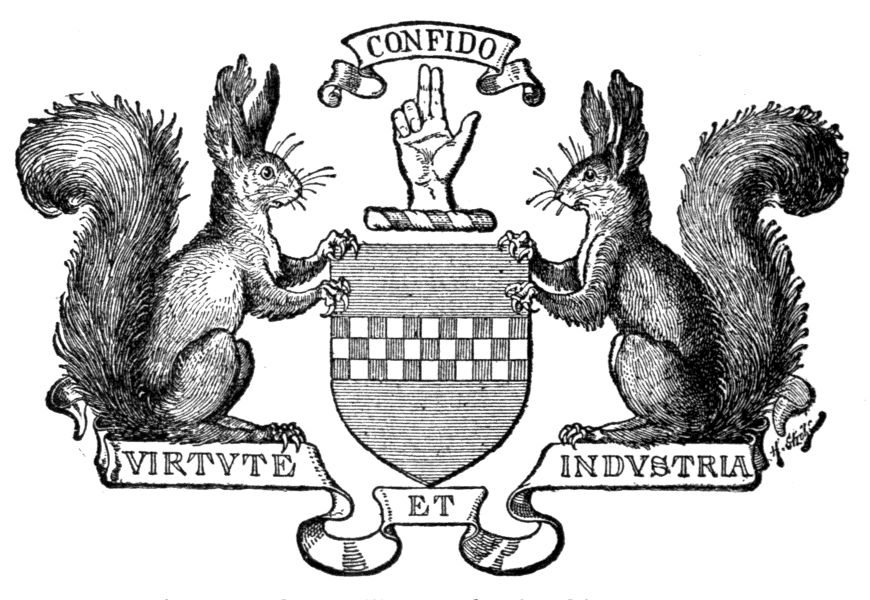
- Coat of arms

- Location within East Ayrshire
- Area: 27.3 km^{2} (10.5 sq mi)
- Population: 47,064 (2022)
  - Density: 1,724/km^{2} (4,470/sq mi)
- Settlement: 51,370 (2020)
- OS grid reference: NS429381
  - Edinburgh: 56 mi (90 km)
  - London: 335 mi (539 km)
- Council area: East Ayrshire
- Lieutenancy area: Ayrshire and Arran
- Country: Scotland
- Sovereign state: United Kingdom
- Post town: KILMARNOCK
- Postcode district: KA1-KA3
- Dialling code: 01563
- Police: Scotland
- Fire: Scottish
- Ambulance: Scottish
- UK Parliament: Kilmarnock and Loudoun
- Scottish Parliament: Kilmarnock and Irvine Valley
- Website: East Ayrshire Council

Kilmarnock (/kɪlˈmɑːrnək/ kil-MAR-nək; Scots: Kilmaurnock; Scottish Gaelic: Cill Mheàrnaig, IPA: [kʲʰiːʎ ˈvaːɾnəkʲ]), meaning "the church of Mernóc", also colloquially referred to as Killie, is a town and former burgh in East Ayrshire situated in southwest Scotland. The town has served as the administrative centre of East Ayrshire Council since 1996, and is the region's main commercial and industrial centre. The town has a total of 284 listed buildings and structures as designed by Historic Environment Scotland, including the Dick Institute, Dean Castle, Loanhead School and the original 1898 building of Kilmarnock Academy, with post-war developments of the controversial 1970s regeneration including the Clydesdale Bank building receiving Category C status in 2026.

The first passenger conveying railway in Scotland originated in Kilmarnock in 1812 as a horse-drawn four-foot-gauge (1.2 m) plateway and became known as the Kilmarnock and Troon Railway. The first printed collection of works by Scottish poet Robert Burns was published in 1786 in Kilmarnock. Poems, Chiefly in the Scottish Dialect, was published by John Wilson, and became known as the Kilmarnock Edition. The whisky Johnnie Walker was established in the town in the 19th century and was produced and bottled at the Hill Street plant until closure in 2012, following an announcement by owners Diageo in 2009 that the plant would close as part of company restructuring.

The town grew considerably during the 1870s and the town's growth subsumed the village of Bonnyton, and by the 1960s, new purpose built suburbs such as New Farm Loch were constructed to accommodate the increasing population of Kilmarnock. In 2022, the population of the town was 47,064, making Kilmarnock the 15th most populated settlement in Scotland as well as the largest town in Ayrshire by population.

== Etymology ==
The name Kilmarnock comes from the Gaelic cill (cell), and the name of Saint Marnock or Mernoc who is also remembered in the name of Portmarnock in Ireland and Inchmarnock. It may come from the three Gaelic elements mo, 'my', Ernán (name of the saint) and the diminutive ag, giving Church of My Little Ernán. According to tradition, the saint founded a church there in the 7th century. The name Kilmarnock literally means "Marnock's Church". There are 12 Church of Scotland congregations in the town, plus other denominations. In 2005, the Reverend David W. Lacy, minister of the town's Henderson Church, was elected Moderator of the General Assembly of the Church of Scotland.

== History ==
=== Origins ===
The town's precise origins are largely unclear, however, it is believed that a community was established between the fifth–seventh centuries at the Laigh Kirk Church by a Saint Marnock. The earliest known mention of the town was in the 14th century, with Clan Boyd coming to prominence in the area during that time, building the Keep of the Dean Castle. The Romans held a "tentative grip" on the area in and around Kilmarnock, with forts nearby at Loudoun Castle as well as possessing costal harbours around Ayrshire. Early references to the town are vague in regards to population numbers and the geographical size of the town, however, it is widely believed that at this time, the town was little more than a small cluster of dwellings situated around the Laigh Kirk church.

By the end of the sixteenth century, Kilmarnock had become a burgh of barony, and had a weekly market stall and by the 1600s had grown into a small network of narrow streets, with the population relying on industries such as spinning wool, knitting bonnets and the manufacturing of metal cutlery to make a living. A fire engulfed the town in 1668, following the hunting of Covenanters by government troops.

The core of the early town appears to have lain around what is now the Laigh Kirk, Kilmarnock (Low Church), although the oldest parts of the current building are no earlier than the 17th century, extending north and northwest. In 1668 the town was largely destroyed by an accidental fire. About 120 families lost most of their possessions and were forced to live destitute in the fields surrounding the town. These tradespeople had no other way of making a living and had already been driven to the edge of poverty by having troops stationed with them as part of the anti-Covenanter measures. Parish churches throughout Scotland collected money for the relief of these homeless citizens.

=== Burgh of Barony, 1592 ===
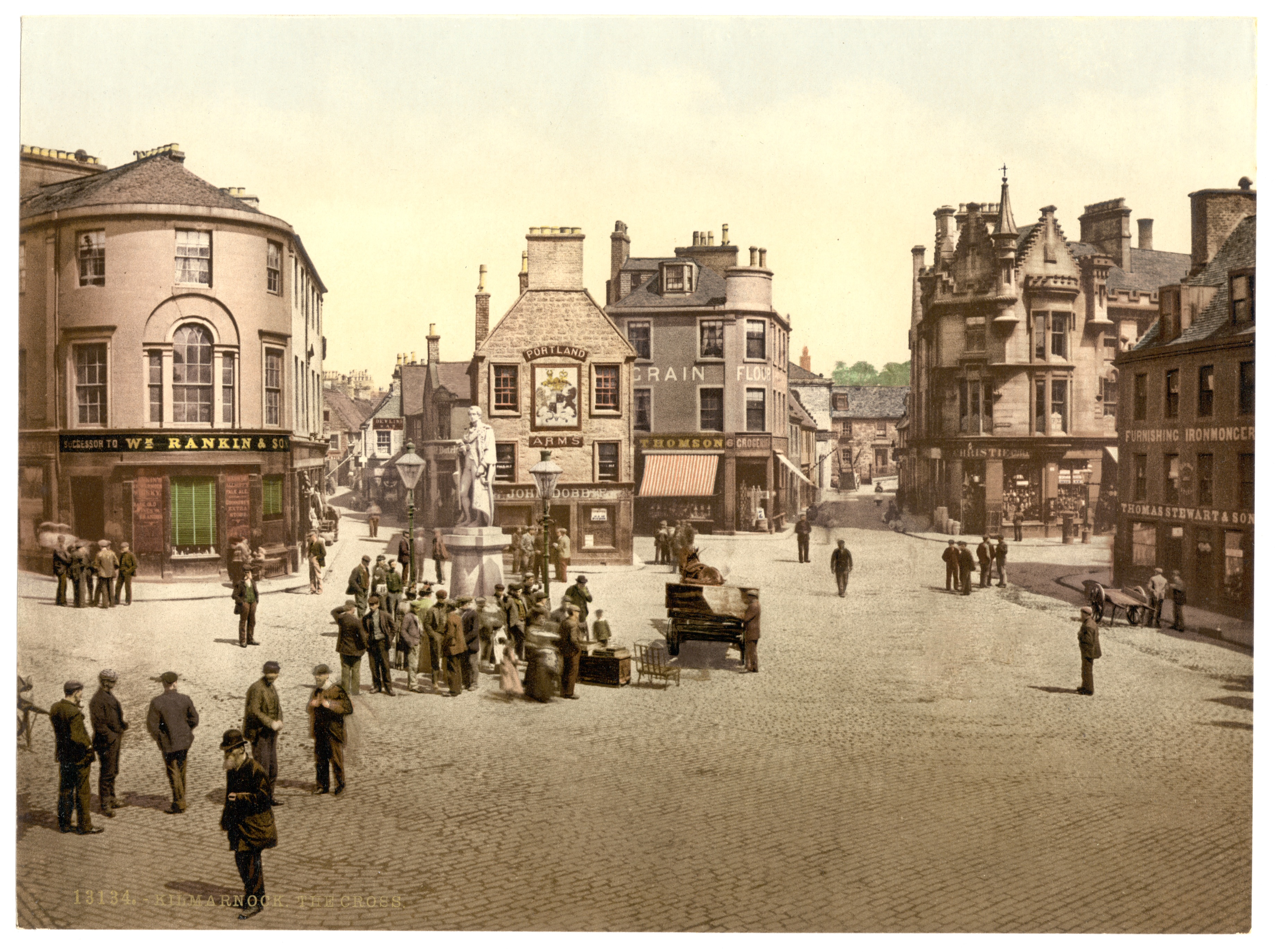
Kilmarnock Cross between 1890 and 1900

In 1592, King James VI of Scotland granted a charter to Thomas, Lord Boyd, erecting Kilmarnock into a burgh of barony. The charter confirms that the Boyd family to be in possession of the land of Kilmarnock and assures any future line of succession. At the beginning of the 16th century, Kilmarnock was described as "a large village and of great repair" with nearby Kilmaurs notably larger than Kilmarnock. However, over the course of the next one hundred years, the expansion of Kilmarnock was evident. Its expansion led to Kilmarnock becoming larger than Kilmaurs and becoming Ayrshire's largest inland centre and challenging the supremacy of the royal burghs of Ayr and Irvine. During the 19th century, due to the growing rate of expansion due to the industrial expansion, Kilmarnock's population growth increased significantly from 6,000 in 1800, 21,000 in 1851 and 35,000 by 1901.

In the early nineteenth century, Kilmarnock was developed considerably, with the town improvement committee creating plans to improve the road network around the town as they considered the narrow streets that had been in place at the time to be a hindrance for potential trade and development. Plans for new grid-based streets were developed following the consideration of the town improvement committee which resulted in thoroughfares through King Street, Titchfield Street, John Finnie Street and surrounding roadways. The full planned course of the development were never fully completed, resulting in many of the towns older streets and lanes within the new grid-based developments, including Bank Street, Croft Street and Nelson Street not being redeveloped. The refurbished streets were lined with commercial properties, and John Finnie Street is considered one of the most complete examples of Victorian architecture in Scotland.

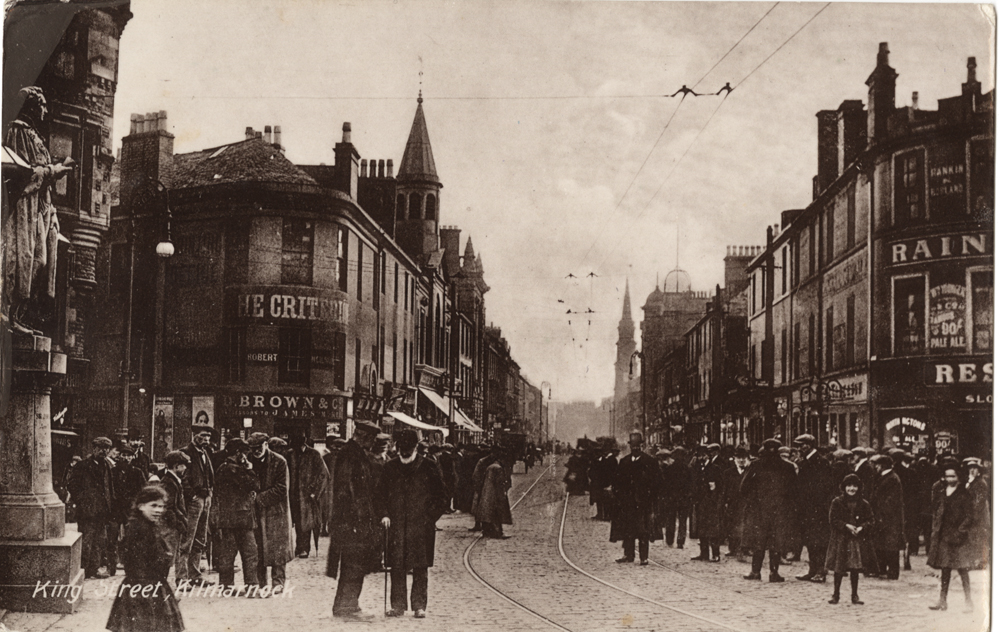
King Street in 1900

Although never granted the title of royal burgh, largely due to its geography as an inland settlement with no port to enhance trade at sea, Kilmarnock, as a parliamentary burgh was ranked as equal to other nearby royal burghs such as Ayr and Irvine. Its close proximity to Troon and its harbour helped Kilmarnock's trade and economy and its reputation of a strong and important burgh despite its inland position. Goods such as coal were frequently transported from Kilmarnock to Troon for export, and by 1812 a new railway line between Kilmarnock and Troon was constructed to allow trade to flow from the town much easier. The line opened in 1812, and was the first railway in Scotland to obtain an authorising Act of Parliament; it became the first railway in Scotland to use a steam locomotive; the first to carry passengers; and the River Irvine bridge, Laigh Milton Viaduct, is the earliest railway viaduct in Scotland. It was a plateway, using L-shaped iron plates as rails, to carry wagons with flangeless wheels. In 1841, when more modern railways had developed throughout the West of Scotland, the line was converted from a plateway to a railway and realigned in places. The line became part of the Glasgow and South Western Railway system. Much of the original route is part of the present-day Kilmarnock to Barassie railway line, although the extremities of the original line have been lost.

When elected county councils were created in 1890 under the Local Government (Scotland) Act 1889, the burgh of Kilmarnock was deemed capable of running its own affairs and so was excluded from the jurisdiction of Ayrshire County Council. Further local government reform in 1930 brought the burgh within the area controlled by Ayrshire County Council, but classed as a large burgh, which allowed the town to continue to run many local services itself. Kilmarnock Town Council was based at the Town Hall at 28 King Street, which was built in 1805 and demolished in the 1970s.

=== Early growth ===
OS map of Kilmarnock and the surrounding region in Ayrshire, Renfrewshire and Lanarkshire, 1906

The growth of Kilmarnock in population and geographical area swallowed up the old separate village communities of Beansburn, Bonnyton, and Riccarton. This led to such communities and villages around the town losing their identities due to the process of rehousing people who were dispersed to the new housing schemes. These large new housing areas lacked adequate shopping and recreational facilities, and most of them were not within convenient walking distance of the old town centre. Despite the growth in population of Kilmarnock, the town did not grow in terms of proportion, and construction of new building took place mostly on "gap sites", the construction of houses at Robertson Place by the Kilmarnock Building Company, being an exception.

This expansion led to the town becoming a major centre in the west of Scotland. By 1856, Kilmarnock was widely regarded as a key railway location when the Glasgow and South Western Railway re-located their workshops from Cook Street in Glasgow to Bonnyton. Homes were constructed for the workers of the Glasgow & South Western Railway Company at Bonnyton Square and at other areas in Bonnyton. These houses were later demolished in 1966 and 1967.

=== Industrial revolution ===
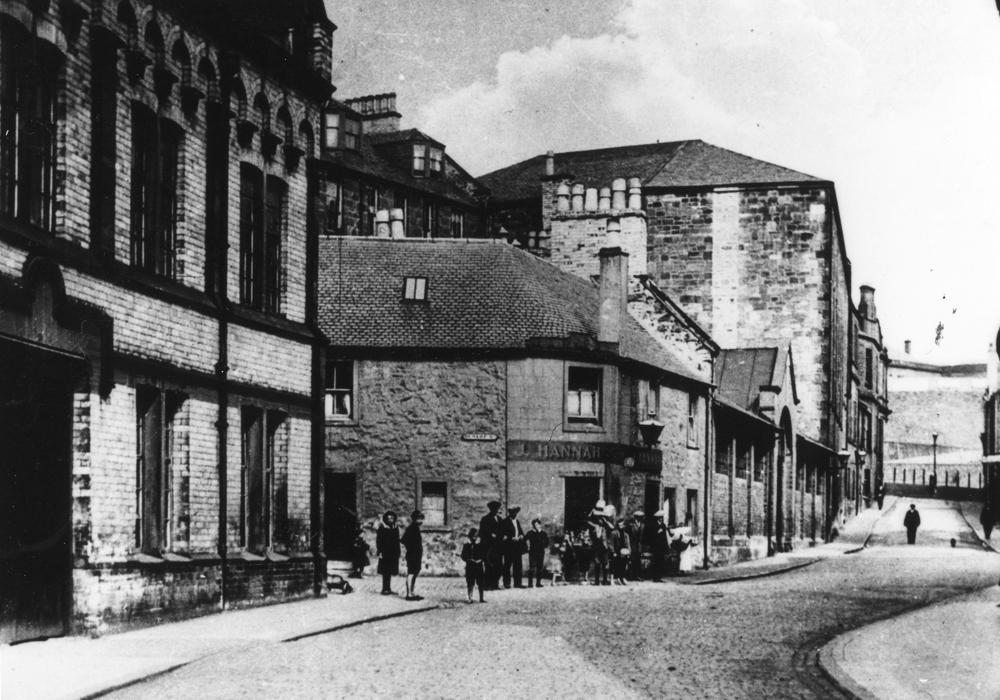
The Strand in Kilmarnock, the site of the buildings which constituted the Johnnie Walker Whisky bonds

A comparatively modest settlement until the Industrial Revolution, Kilmarnock extended considerably from around 1800 onwards, requiring the opening of King Street, Portland Street, and Wellington Street. Added later was John Finnie Street, which is regarded as "one of the finest Victorian planned streets in Scotland." The Sandbed Street Bridge is the oldest known surviving bridge in the area.

During the 19th century, the traditional cottage crafts in the town which had been "around for generations", expanded and grew into major industries. A number of Kilmarnock industries established both national and international reputations, such as leather makers who were sought to make items such as belts, saddles and other leather goods. Boots and shoes began to dominate the leather making industry in the town, and by 1837, local shoemakers were making in excess of 2,400 pairs of shoes and boots. In 1840, George Clark's shoe making company, established and based in the town, began exporting shoes to Brazil, using the merchant venture system which was created to allow producers to make use of any spare space on cargo ships. It is widely believed that Clark used cargo ships mostly carrying Kilmarnock whisky exports, and as a result, both Kilmarnock whisky and shoe made products became widely popular in Brazil. The shoe production business continued to grow, and by 1900, Clark's shoe business, Saxone, had a total of 40 shop premises in Brazil.

Additionally, Kilmarnock gained a reputation of being a location for quality carpet making, following Charlotte Maria Gardiner, half auntie of the 4th Earl of Kilmarnock, bringing a number of carpet makers from Dalkeith to Kilmarnock. BMK Carpets was founded in Kilmarnock in 1908, quickly earning a reputation for the top carpet manufacturer of choice for major venues. It remained Kilmarnock's main employer until closure in 2005. Glenfield and Kennedy became the largest company of hydraulic engineers in the British Empire. All three companies – BMK Carpets, Saxone Shoes and Glenfield and Kennedy, became widely known and trusted in export markets internationally. Johnnie Walker whisky, established as a grocery shop in 1820, was transformed into a global whisky brand, and is the world's best selling brand of whisky. The Titchfield Street drill hall was completed in 1914.

=== World War efforts ===
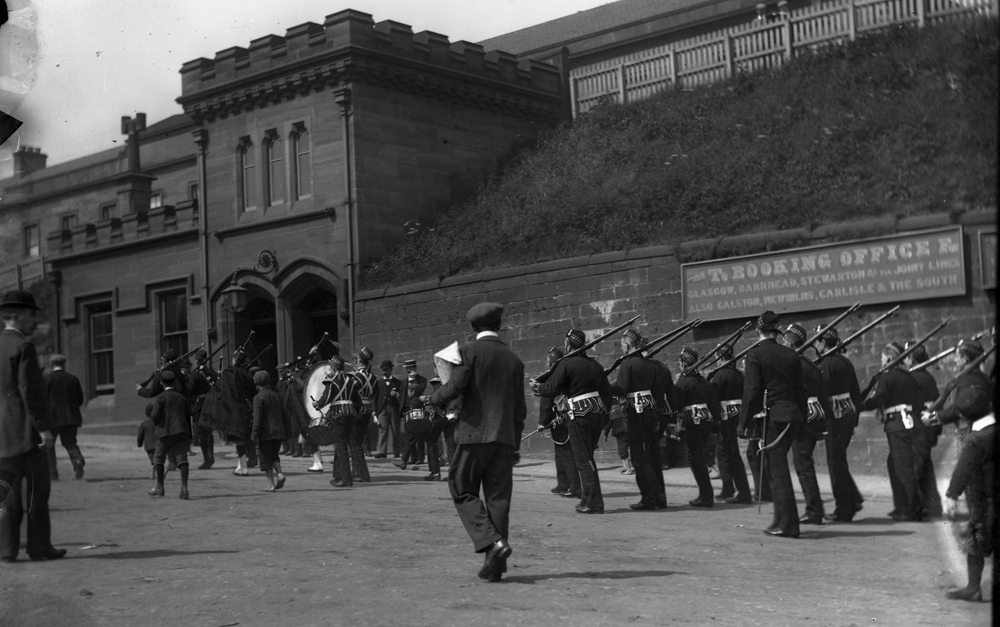
Kilmarnock Rifle Soldiers heading to Kilmarnock railway station to join war efforts, roughly between 1890 and 1902

The Kilmarnock War Memorial was constructed in temple style and completed in 1927, becoming dedicated to local men who died "for king and country" during World War I. Following World War II, more plaques were added to the war memorial to commemorate local men who died during World War II, and later, plaques to commemorate those who fought in the Korean War were added.The first post–war housing scheme in Kilmarnock, at Shortlees, was completed by the 1960s, followed by Bellfield by the end of the decade.

Following the second World War, many of the towns factories and production sites had to be transformed into meeting civil needs, rather than those needs of the military, as had been expected during the war effort. A considerable effort began to construct "homes for heroes" in Kilmarnock following World War II, taking "years, even decades, to complete". New companies opened in Kilmarnock by the late 1940s and early 1950s, such as Glacier Metal Massey-Harris. The first post-war housing scheme in Kilmarnock, at Shortlees, was completed by the 1960s, followed by Bellfield by the end of the decade.

During World War II, a local battalion of the Home Guard was established in the town to protect the area during the war. The Kilmarnock Guard was known as the 4th North Kyle Home Guard, with men from Kilmarnock, Galston, Newmilns, Darvel, Hurlford, Fenwick and Craigie part of the battalion. The battalion was commanded by Lieutenant-Colonel D.M. Wilkie, with F. Richmond Paton as second in command, and Major Hugh B. Farrar as adjutant.

Kilmarnock based carpet manufacturing company BMK ceased production of carpets for a time during the second world war to manufacture bomb shells for the war effort. Glenfild & Kennedy, also based in the town, made components for anti-tank guns among other war-related engineering projects, including valves for mulberry harbours. Local mansions around the town were requisitioned, such as Bellfield House, with many becoming operational bases for training Special Air Services personnel. Kilmarnock Swimming Baths were also used for this purpose. The town's prominent cooling towers were painted in camouflage to prevent them being visible to the German Luftwaffe.

The town suffered one air raid attack by the Luftwaffe, which killed four people on 6 May 1943. The Luftwaffe dropped a total of fourteen bombs in a line, from South Dean Farm to Kilmarnock cemetery. A 50 kg bomb landed on a block of four residential houses in the towns Culzean Crescent, killing four residents; Janet MacGeachie, Alice MacGeachie, John Bissett and Dorothy Armour.

=== Post–war ===
==== Expansion and housing ====
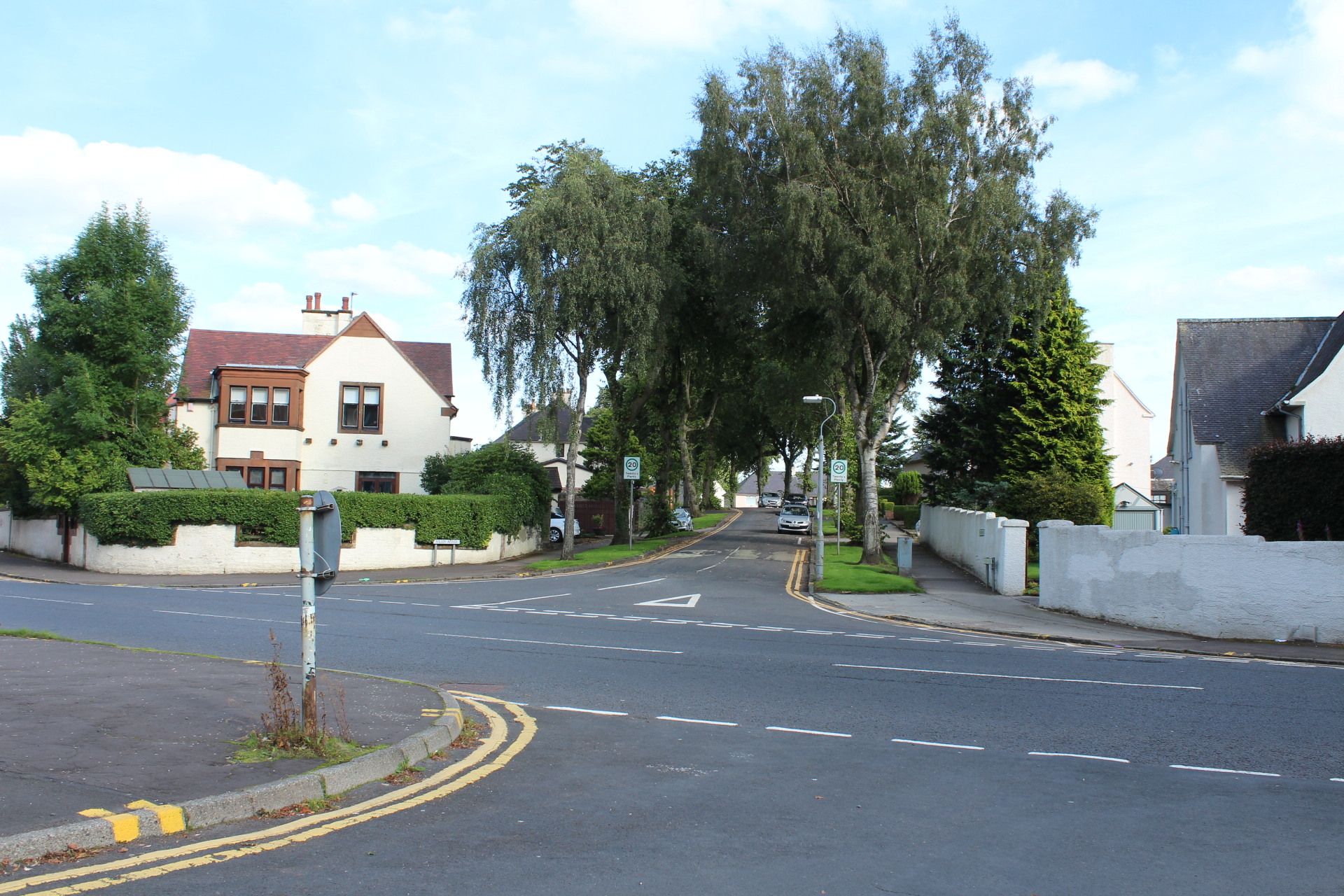
Post–war housing was constructed in areas such as Wilson Avenue (pictured)

In 1945 an attempt by the Burgh Council of Kilmarnock to cope with increasing traffic was made by removing the statue of Sir James Shaw and re-developing the Cross into a roundabout. In 1976, a one-way traffic system was introduced around the town centre which is still in use today as of December 2023, however, that same month, it was confirmed that studies were being conducted which would see the town centre converted back to a two way street for traffic. Considerable growth of the town occurred in the second half of the 19th century, and following World War I, major efforts began to construct new homes to be "fit for heroes". New residential and commercial streets around the town were created, with large housing schemes being built in the years which followed the end of World War II. The first new housing estate in Kilmarnock following World War II became Shortlees, followed by the Grange Estate, Bellfield and Onthank during the 1960s. During this period, the priority continued to be on the construction of council housing, however, there was still a demand for houses in the private market, and with that, the construction of the Grange Estate pushed the boundary of Kilmarnock's built up area.

Despite the new housing estates at Shortlees, Bellfield, Grange and Onthank, housing demand continued to be strong, and the construction of additional housing estates continued through the late 1960s and early 1970s. Mass housing construction to create the New Farm Loch estate aimed to meet the increased demands of the towns population by providing additional space for homes as well as vehicles. More land was allocated than in previous house building projects to meet these demands. A 1923 Act of Parliament granted the construction of new homes at Scott Roads Fulton's Lane, Townholm and Landmark. Additional acts of Parliament in 1924 and 1925 allowed the commencement of construction of additional homes at Annanhill, Ayr Road, Bonnyton, Craigie Road, Granger Road, London Road, Longpark, New Mill Road, New Street, Stoneyhill Avenue and Yorke Place. By 1973, an outer-town bypass was formed to take away the heavy through traffic that had been travelling in and throughout the town. In 1974, the Foregate pedestrianised shopping area was opened, to be followed by a new bus station, a multistorey car park,(the multistorey carpark was demolished at the latter end of 2025 and replaced with a green space), a civic centre, and a re-shaped central precinct for the town.

==== Economic ====
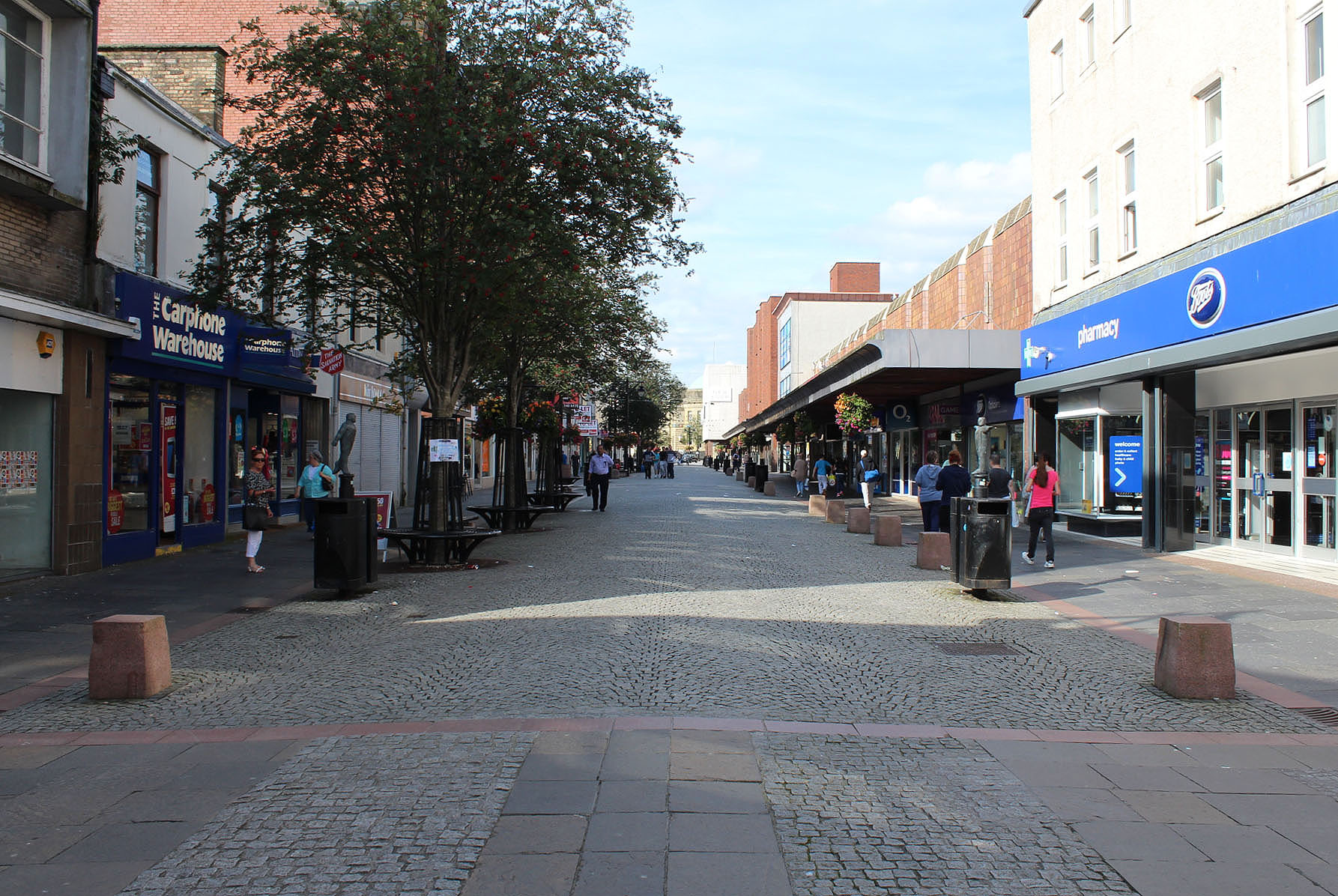
King Street following regeneration

The textile and manufacturing sectors across Scotland suffered significant decline in the post-war period and in particular from the 1960s, in the face of greater foreign competition. Kilmarnock was no exception, with the closure or significant reduction of many of its traditional large employers: Glenfield and Kennedy, Massey Ferguson, BMK and Saxone. Although significant attempts have been made to halt this decline and attract new employers, Kilmarnock saw a continuing net loss of jobs in the five years to 2005.

Although traditionally a main shopping area for most of the surrounding districts, patterns have changed over the last 20 years; traditional centres such as Ayr have been joined by new developments at Braehead and East Kilbride. This difficult economic climate is most visible in the town centre, the eastern part of which has been extensively redeveloped, with important historic buildings such as King Street Church and the town hall being demolished and Duke Street (the link from Kilmarnock Cross to the Palace Theatre and out to the London Road) built over.

==== Regeneration ====
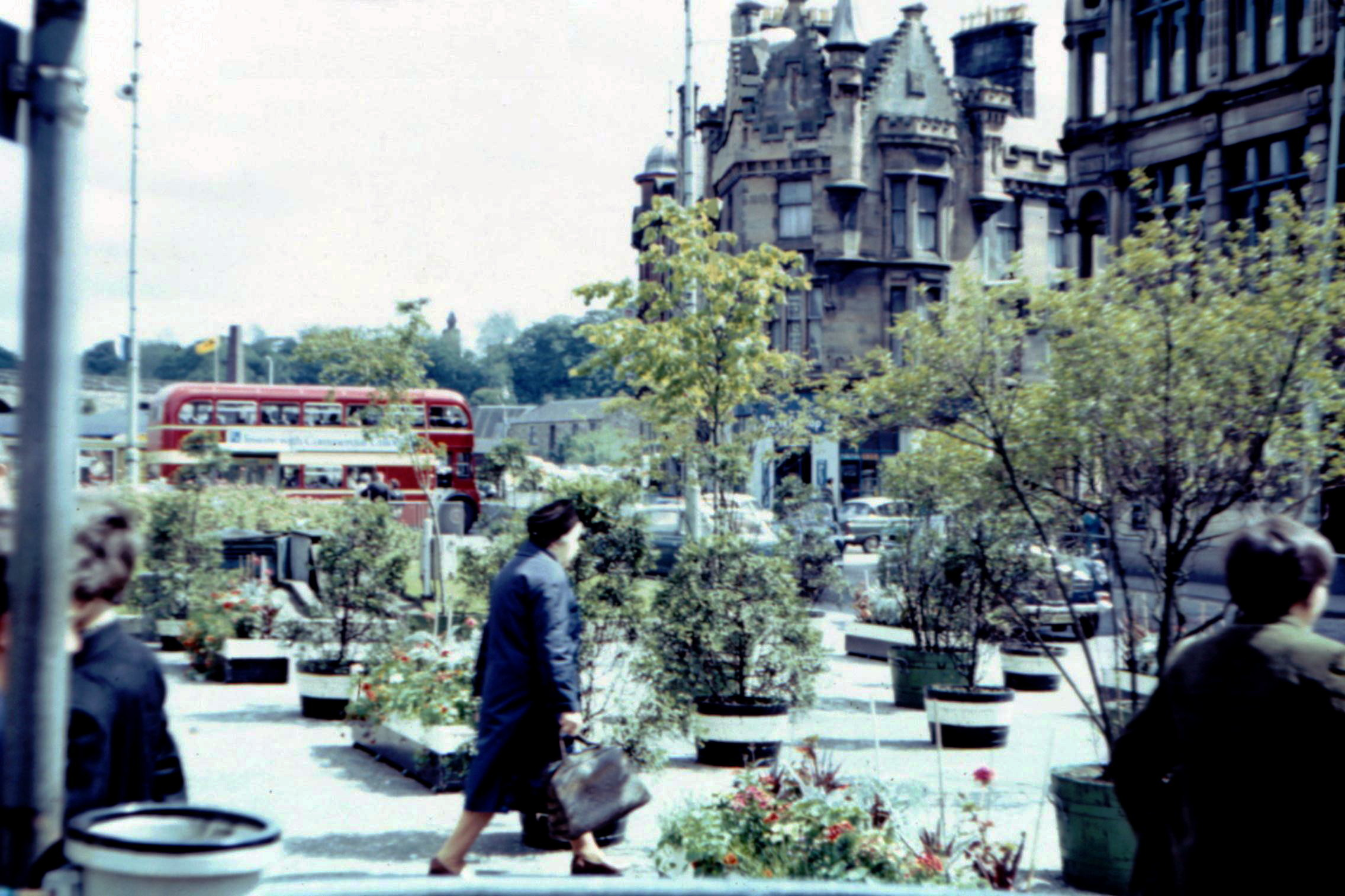
Kilmarnock town centre before regeneration, 1972

During the late 1960s and into the 1970s, Kilmarnock, predominately the town centre, underwent an extensive programme of regeneration which saw a number of historic structures particularly on King Street demolished to make way for new buildings as part of redevelopment plans. In 1966, the Kilmarnock Town Council appointed Edinburgh based firm Percy Johnson-Marshall to examine ways forward to combat increased traffic and land usage within the town centre. Amongst the plans were the construction of seven multi-storey carparks for shoppers to the town centre, however, only one of these were ever constructed. The multi-storey began being demolished in 2024 following structural concerns.

Other plans produced by the firm resulted in large sections of John Finnie Street, West George Street and several houses on Dundonald Road being demolished to accommodate land for the projects. Additionally, the Newton area of the town was proposed to be demolished entirely, with residents to be offered new housing in the New Farm Loch estate which at that time was still be constructed. Such plans never materialised, instead, the town council approved Phase 1 of plans presented by Percy Johnson-Marshall which saw the eastern side and surroundings of both Portland Street and King Street being demolished to create land for new developments.

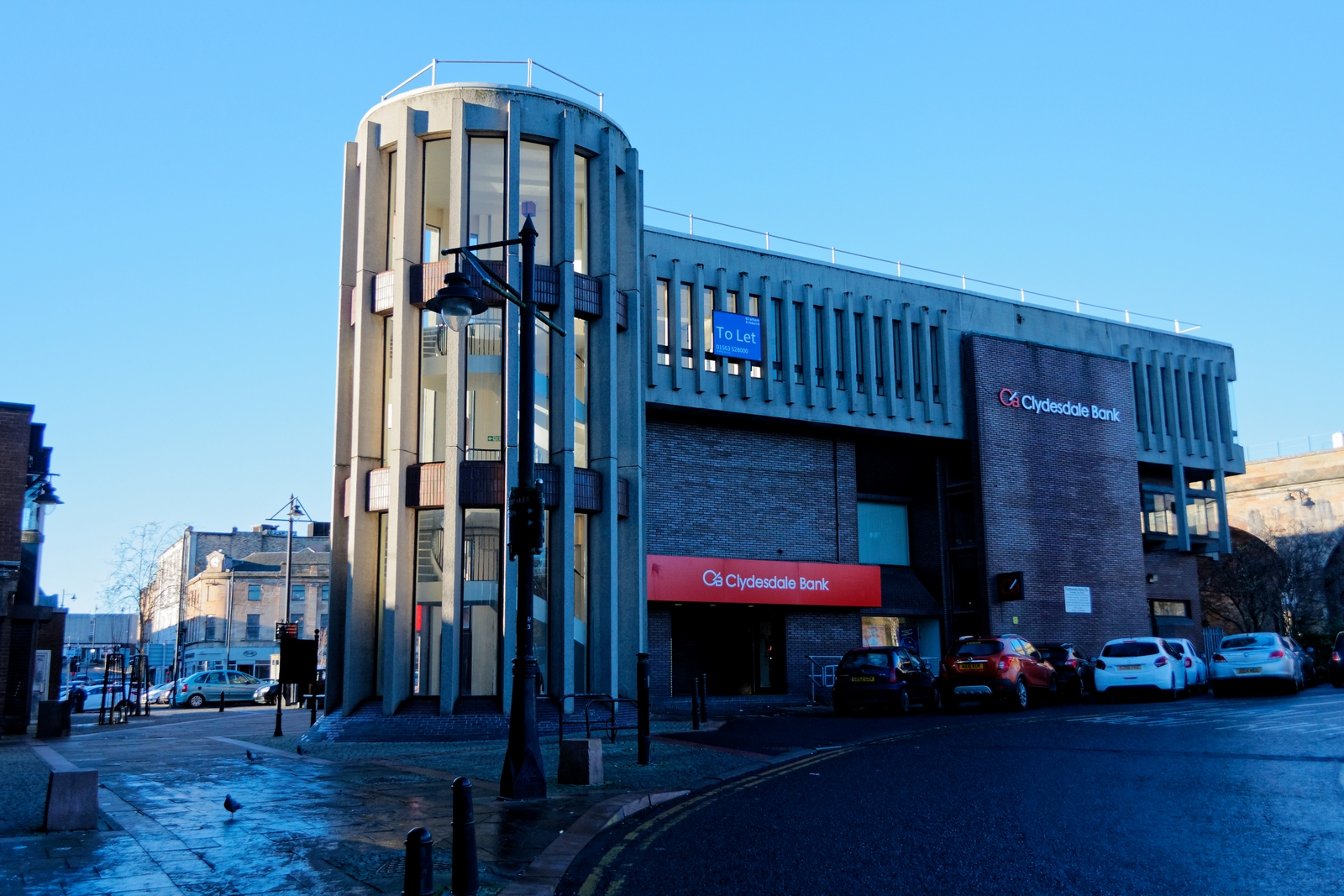
The Clydesdale Bank, described as "one of the most vibrant and forceful Scottish bank buildings of the post war era"

Duke Street and Waterloo Street were demolished entirely, after a developer had assessed them both as being "obsolete". The town council purchased properties to demolish through a process of negotiation and ultimately Compulsory Purchase Orders in order to progress with redevelopment plans.

Small and independent private traders were forcibly relocated from both Waterloo Street and Duke Street, with The Foregate, a new shopping area constructed as part of the regeneration plans to relocate such traders. Plans for The Foregate also included a high-rise hotel and a cinema, however, both proposals were later shelved, with the Kilmarnock Centre (now the Burns Shopping Centre) constructed instead. The Foregate was constructed in a style which saw extensive brick-built commercial developments including offices over shops with canted projecting plate-glass windows.

The Clydesdale Bank building located at the top of The Foregate is considered an "individual brutalist piece of architecture. The building is now occupied by a Virgin Money bank, and has been described as "one of the most vibrant and forceful Scottish bank buildings of the post war era".

Phases 2 and 3 of the regeneration project never materialised as a result of economic strains.

=== Administrative centre, 1996 ===
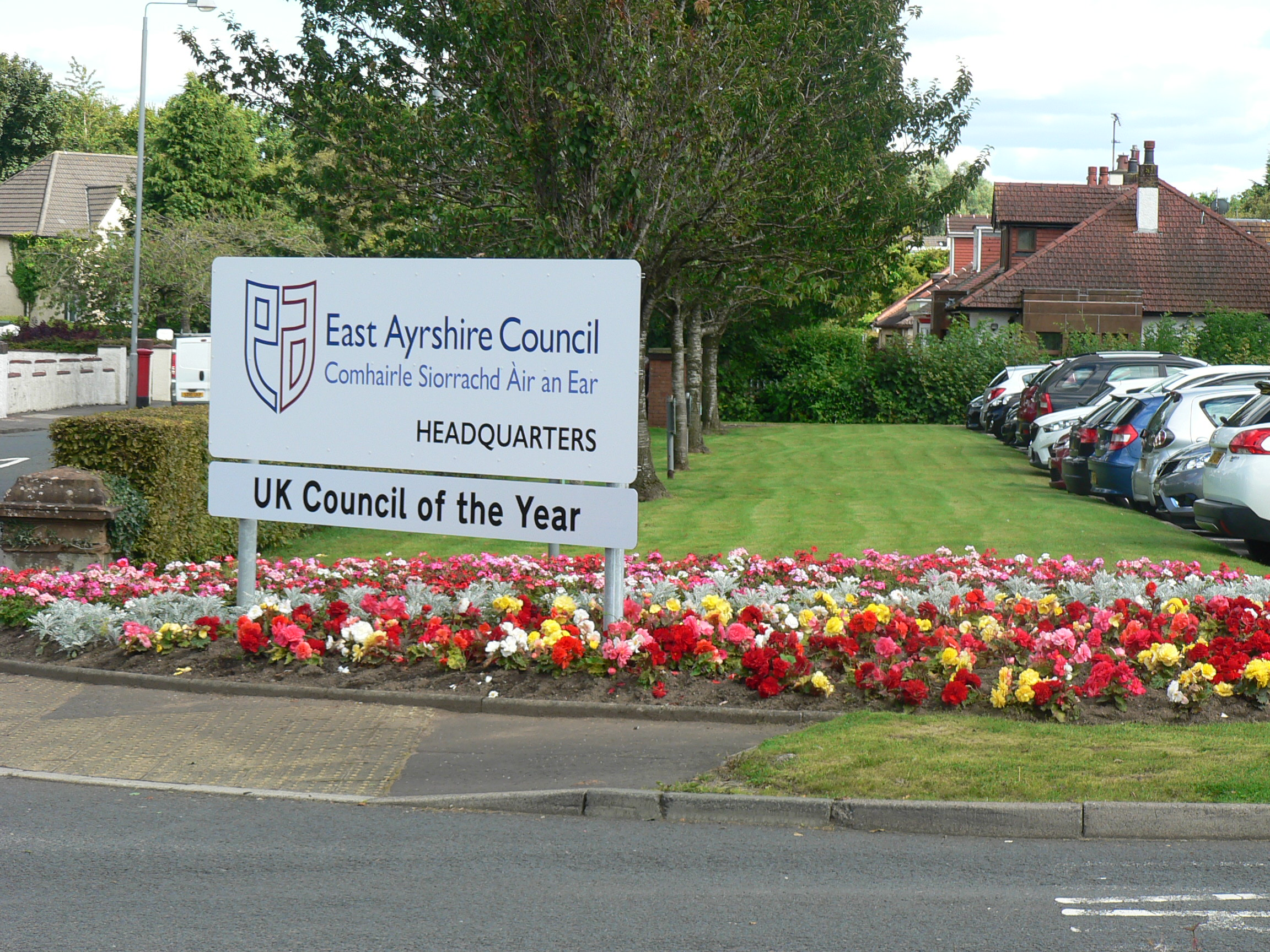
Kilmarnock is the administrative centre of East Ayrshire Council

In 1996 the two-tier system of regions and districts was abolished and Ayrshire was divided between the unitary council areas of East Ayrshire (covering the area of the former Kilmarnock & Loudoun District and Cumnock & Doon Valley District), North Ayrshire (covering the area of the former Cunninghame District Council) and South Ayrshire (covering the area of the former Kyle and Carrick District).

Following this, Kilmarnock now came under East Ayrshire Council which was formed in April 1995 to replace the Kilmarnock and Loudoun and Cumnock and Doon Valley District Councils, and the part of Strathclyde Regional Council which related to the area. The newly formed East Ayrshire Council were granted responsibility for areas such as education, social work, leisure and planning, among other services, for Kilmarnock and the wider East Ayrshire geographical area.

Kilmarnock became the administrative centre for the newly formed East Ayrshire Council, with the council purchasing the former James Hamilton Academy building on London Road for £1. The building was refurbished and has since been the meeting place for elected councillors, the cabinet of East Ayrshire Council and is the main seat for the Chief Executive of East Ayrshire Council, the provost of East Ayrshire and Depute Provost of East Ayrshire.

=== Recent history ===
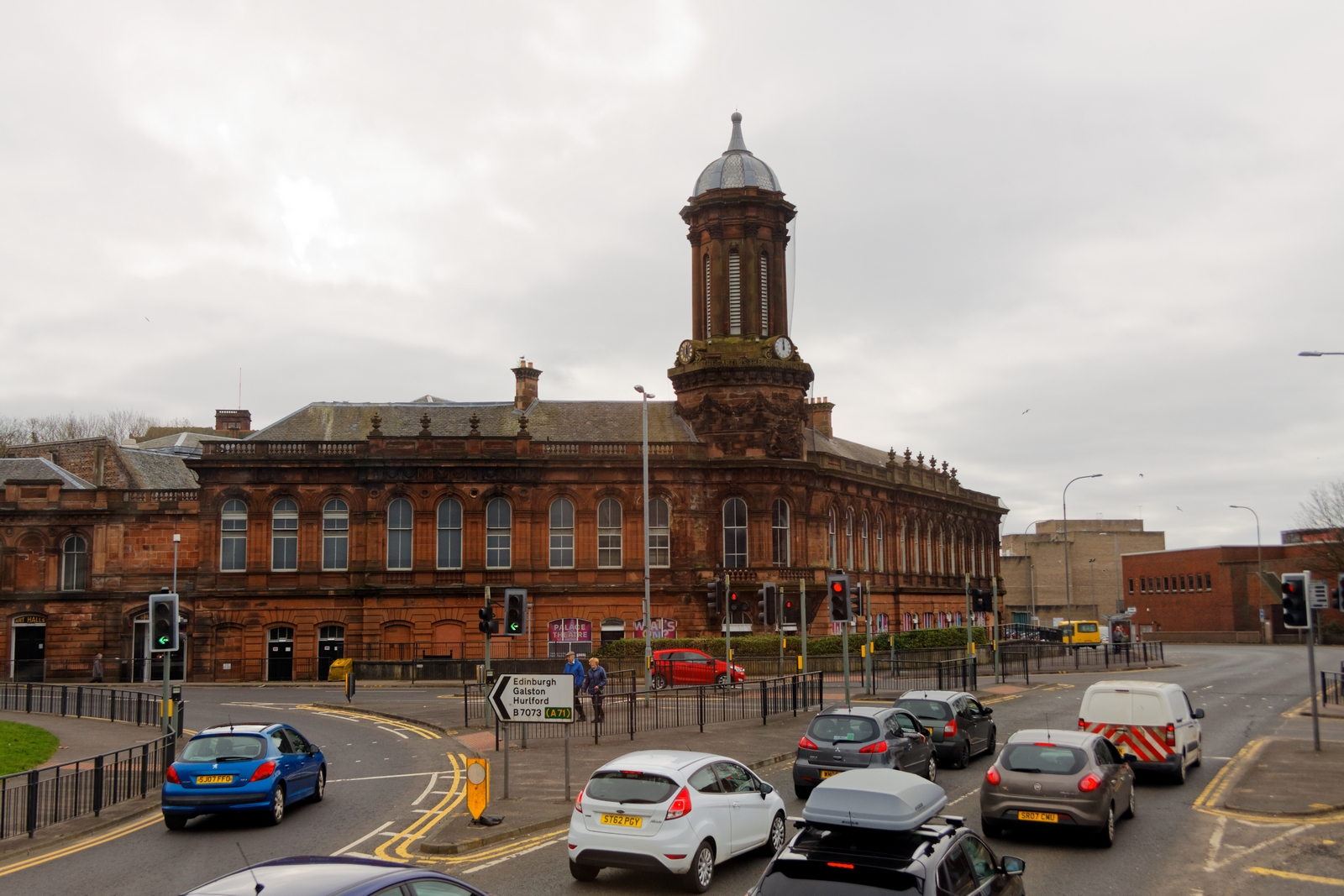
The town's Palace Theatre and Grand Hall complex is set to undergo £20 million investment between 2025 and 2027

In 2004, the Rough Guide to Scotland described the town as "shabby and depressed, saddled with some terrible shopping centres and a grim one-way system". In early 2006, an application to Historic Scotland's Conservation Area Regeneration Scheme was successful, and in July 2006 an application under the Heritage Lottery Fund's Townscape Heritage Initiative Scheme was pending, allowing work to be finished on a quality housing development on the site of the former Kilmarnock Infirmary, north of the town centre, which was completed by local property development company The KLIN Group. With a journey time of 20 minutes from Kilmarnock to Glasgow, the M77 motorway received an extensive upgrade in 2005 to accommodate Kilmarnock's emerging status as a commuter town. As a result, new quality housing has been constructed on the northern fringes of the town for commuters to Glasgow and the central belt of Scotland. Recent house price in and around Kilmarnock have reflected the towns location for commuters to the country's largest city.

In 2015, Kilmarnock was named 'Scotland's Most Improved Town' at the Scottish Urban Regeneration Forum awards. The panel recognised the improvements made to the town centre of Kilmarnock due to a £43 million investment, and local authority intervention to restore derelict buildings including the former Johnnie Walker bond building and the Opera House. In April 2018, East Ayrshire Council published a plan to protect and enhance the towns historic and listed buildings. Structures such as the former ABC cinema (previously the King's Theatre) on Titchfield Street has lay derelict since the opening of the Odeon cinema at Queens Drive. Buildings such as this are considered to be irreplaceable listed buildings. East Ayrshire Council has committed to regenerating the town, with buildings such as the former Opera House on John Finnie Street which was destroyed by fire in the late 1980s, being reconstructed with its original facade retained and is now office space for East Ayrshire Council.

The end of the 20th century and the beginning of the 21st century is widely regarded as a "boom period" for housing construction in Kilmarnock. Large numbers of farm land was purchased by housing developers, with an "unprecedented" number of houses being completed, notably at Southcraig, Dunsmuir Park and the Johnnie Walker estate. The largest house building projects in Kilmarnock were undertaken at Southcraig and Dunsmuir Park.

In February 2021, a series of co-ordinated attacks occurred in the town which resulted in three deaths. On 14 July 2025, a "deliberate and wilful" large scale fire broke out at Victoria Buildings, a Category C listed building on King Street, which lead to a partial collapse of the building. Following investigations by East Ayrshire Council, the building was deemed unsafe in the interest of public safety and was subsequently scheduled for demolition.

== Governance ==
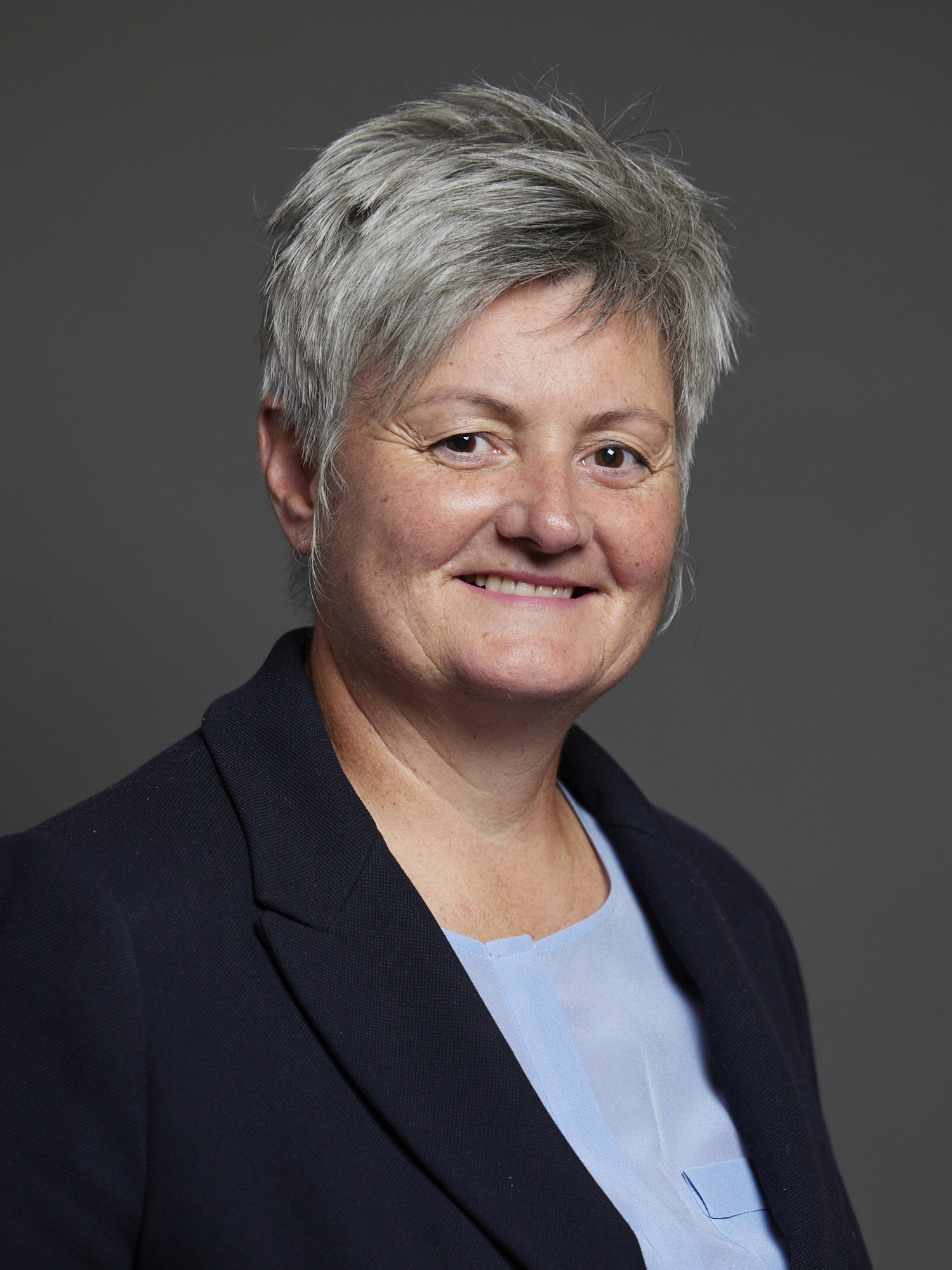
Lillian Jones, MP since 2024

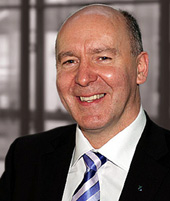
Willie Coffey, MSP since 2007

Kilmarnock, as part of the Kilmarnock and Loudoun parliamentary constituency, had long been considered a "safe seat" for the Scottish Labour Party, having been represented by a Labour MP since the establishment of the constituency in 1983. However, at the 2015 general election, the seat changed hands from Labour to the Scottish National Party with the election of Alan Brown, at an election which resulted in a landslide victory for the SNP at the expense of Scottish Labour. Brown defeated Labour candidate Cathy Jamieson with an overwhelming majority with Brown receiving 30,000 votes with Jamieson only receiving 16,363. At the 2024 election, Scottish Labour regained the seat from the SNP, the first time they have gained the seat from the SNP since 2015, when Scottish Labour candidate Lillian Jones won the election with 19,055 votes with a majority of 5,119.

The member of the Scottish Parliament (MSP) for Kilmarnock is Willie Coffey, having represented the area as the MSP of the Kilmarnock and Irvine Valley constituency since 2007.

Following the 2017 East Ayrshire Council election, the SNP formed a minority government for East Ayrshire, following the result of a hung council. At present, the Scottish Labour party is the opposition in the East Ayrshire parliament with their leader, Maureen McKay alongside the Scottish Conservative Party, independent councillors and one councillor elected from local campaign group party, The Rubbish Party.

Kilmarnock is the administrative centre of East Ayrshire Council, with the council headquarters and debating chamber situated on the London Road. In local council elections, Kilmarnock comprises four wards: Kilmarnock North, Kilmarnock East and Hurlford, Kilmarnock West and Crosshouse, and Kilmarnock South. The current leader of East Ayrshire Council is Councillor Douglas Reid of the SNP, who has been leader since 2007. The chief executive is Eddie Fraser, who has been Chief Executive since 2020.

Councillors in Kilmarnock
Ward	Councillors	Party
Kilmarnock North	Helen Coffey	Scottish National Party
Kilmarnock North	Ian Grant	Scottish Conservative Party
Kilmarnock North	Maureen McKay	Scottish Labour Party
Kilmarnock West and Crosshouse	Tom Cook	Scottish Conservative Party
Kilmarnock West and Crosshouse	Ian Linton	Scottish National Party
Kilmarnock West and Crosshouse	Lillian Jones	Scottish Labour Party
Kilmarnock West and Crosshouse	Douglas Reid	Scottish National Party
Kilmarnock East and Hurlford	Jon Herd	Scottish Conservative Party
Kilmarnock East and Hurlford	Fiona Campbell	Scottish National Party
Kilmarnock East and Hurlford	John Campbell	Scottish National Party
Kilmarnock East and Hurlford	Barry Douglas	Scottish Labour Party
Kilmarnock South	Clare Maitland	Scottish National Party
Kilmarnock South	Jim Todd	Scottish National Party
Kilmarnock South	John Knapp	Scottish Labour Party

== Demography ==
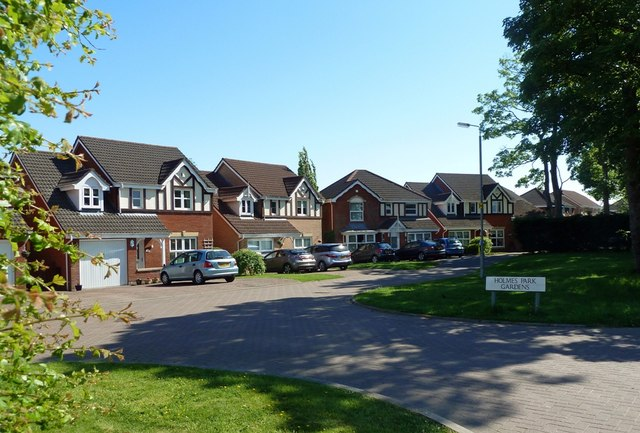
Housing in Holmes Park Gardens

Kilmarnock is both the largest town in East Ayrshire and its administrative centre, and the largest town in Ayrshire by population. The town had an estimated population of 46,970 residents in 2020, making it the 14th largest settlement in Scotland.

At Scotland's 2011 census, Kilmarnock had a recorded population of 46,159 inhabitants. The census data highlighted that 45,379 were white (with 42,915 identifying as White Scottish), 121 mixed or multiple ethnic groups, 548 Asian, Asian Scottish or Asian British, 148 Asian, Asian Scottish or Asian British: Indian, Indian Scottish or Indian British and 204 Asian, Asian Scottish or Asian British: Chinese, Chinese Scottish or Chinese British. Other ethnic groups included Asian, Asian Scottish or Asian British: Bangladeshi, Bangladeshi Scottish or Bangladeshi British and Caribbean or Black: Caribbean, Caribbean Scottish or Caribbean British.

At the 2011 census, 12,143 residents were aged over 16 and had no formal qualifications, while 8,983 residents had at least one qualification in Level 1, with 5,185, 4,044 and 7,339 having a qualification Level 2, Level 3 and Level 4 (or above) respectively. There were a total of over 20,000 households in Kilmarnock at the time of the 2011 census, ranging from semi-detached, detached, bungalows, flats and maisonette properties. The 2011 census of Scotland recorded a working population of 34,104 (16–74) in Kilmarnock, with 4,915 recorded part-time employees, 13,504 full-time, 1,978 self-employed, 2,156 unemployed and 1,094 full-time students.

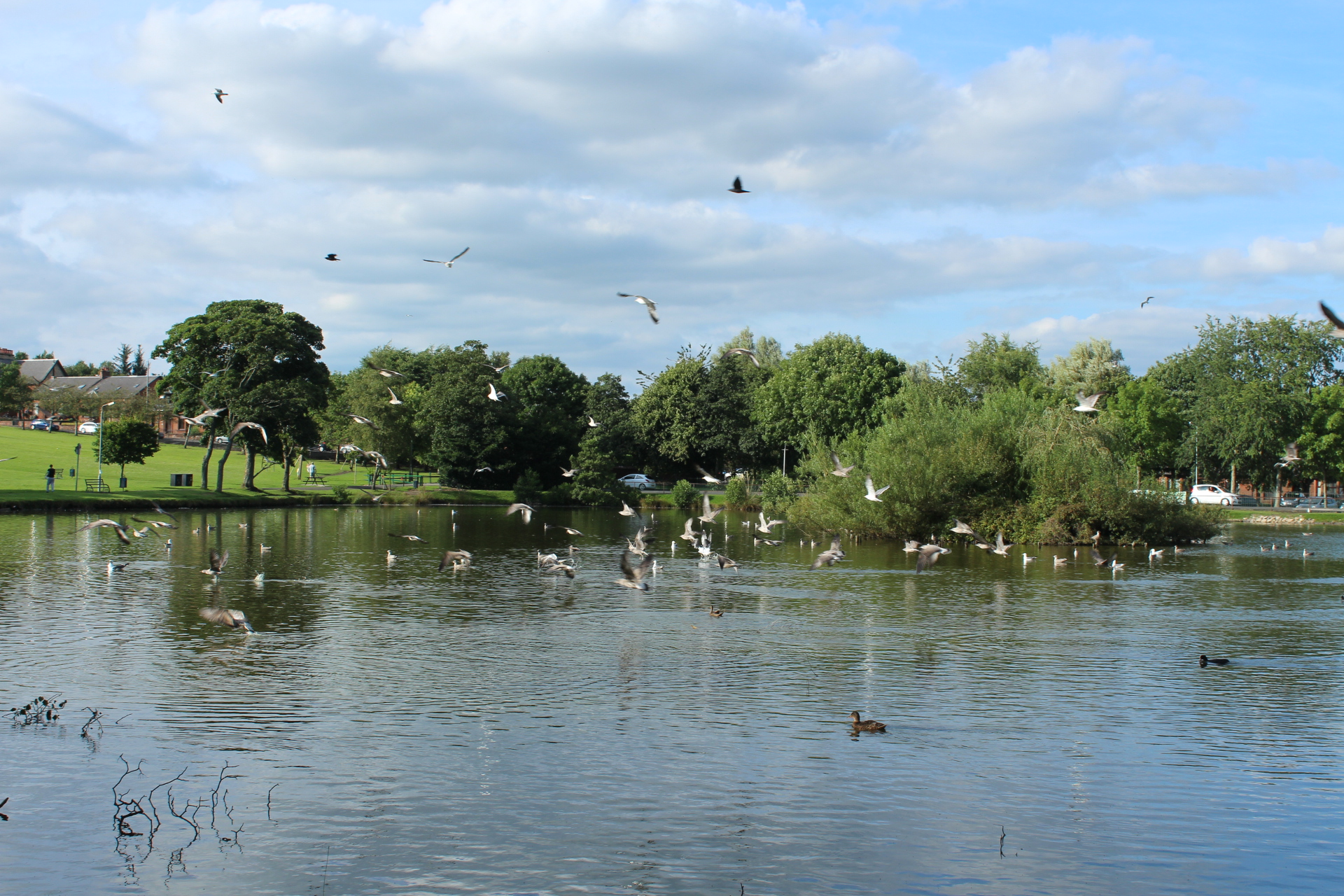
The 30 acre Kay Park in the centre of the town

By the 2022 census, the population of Kilmarnock had increased to 47,064 people, with 48.3% male and 51.7% female. 16.8% lived in the least deprived Scottish Index of Multiple Deprivation (SIMD) decile, whilst 33.8% lived in the most deprived. In 2022, there were a total of 26,303 dwellings in Kilmarnock, an increase from 25,737 in 2014. By 2022, a total of 542 dwellings were unoccupied in the town, compared to 676 in 2014. The most common council tax banding in Kilmarnock was Band A, with 37.7% of properties placed in Tax Band A, whilst Tax Band B was the second most common with 21.7%.

Life expectancy in Kilmarnock is estimated at 74.6 years for males and 79.1 years for females. The life expectancy rate for females is largely in line with both the East Ayrshire and national averages, whilst for males, life expectancy for males in Kilmarnock is slightly below the East Ayrshire average (74.8 years), and two years below the Scottish average for males (76.5 years).

== Economy ==
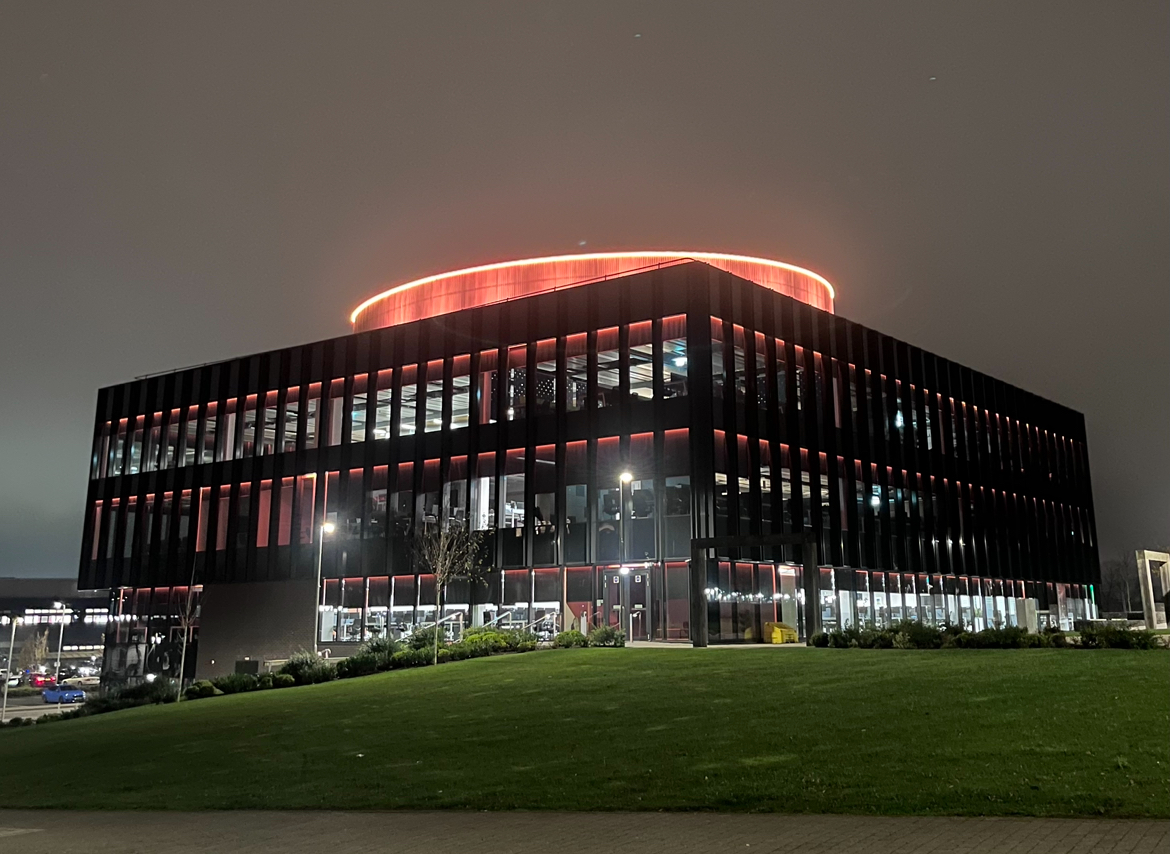
The HALO Urban Regeneration building on Hill Street

The economy of Kilmarnock had historically been centred around heavy manufacturing and goods based services. However, in recent years, and in trend with other towns and cities across Scotland, Kilmarnock's economic dependence has shifted from manufacturing and instead become more reliant on skills-based knowledge. Companies such as Vodafone (Webhelp Call Centre) and Teleperformance occupy a large part of the Rowallan Business Park, which was also previously home to Food Partners, a nationwide sandwich franchise. Nowadays, the economy of Kilmarnock is largely based on public service and office work, with local property redevelopment and regeneration company, The KLIN Group occupies the former Andrew Barclay Sons & Co offices in West Langland Street, Brodie Engineering operate two production factories for locomotives in the town centre and Utopia Computers also have their headquarters and main site situated in Kilmarnock in High Glencairn Street. Kilmarnock is also home to The HALO Urban Regeneration, a business innovation park, urban regeneration and business start-up support company. HALO is set to provide £205 million of Gross Domestic Product (GDP) to the Economy of Scotland. The window and door company, Scotia have their main headquarters in Kilmarnock, as well as a manufacturing and production plant.

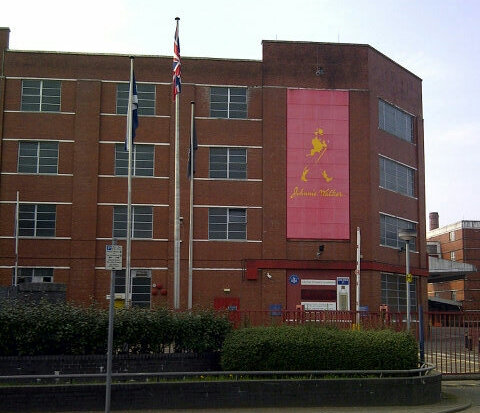
The world's best selling scotch whisky, Johnnie Walker, was established in the town in 1820, and was produced and bottled at Hill Street until closure of the plant in 2012

The internationally best–selling Scotch whisky brand Johnnie Walker was established in Kilmarnock in 1820 by John 'Johnnie' Walker. Originally known as Walker's Kilmarnock Whisky, the brand first started trading from the town in the mid-1800s. The whisky was originally produced, blended and bottled at the Johnnie Walker Bond building, known as "The Bond", in the town centre. Operations continued from The Bond until September 1956 when a new, state of the art and sector leading production plant was opened at Hill Street in the town. At the time of opening in 1956, the Hill Street plant was the world's largest bottling plant. In 2009, to much public backlash as well as backlash from the Scottish Government, First Minister of Scotland Alex Salmond and local MP and MSP Cathy Jamieson and Willie Coffey, the owner of Johnnie Walker, Diageo, decided to close the bottling plant, originally by the end of 2011, ending the link between the whisky brand and the town. In September 2009, Diageo confirmed the plant in Kilmarnock would close, despite local protests. Production of Johnnie Walker in Kilmarnock ceased during March 2012, after 192 years. It is now made at a new Diageo bottling plant in the eastern coast of Scotland in Leven, Fife. Over the years, Kilmarnock has been the home to other well-known companies, Andrew Barclay Sons & Co., and Saxone Shoes. Following the closure of the Hill Street plant, the building was demolished and the site is now home to both the Kilmarnock campus of Ayrshire College and The HALO Urban Regeneration.

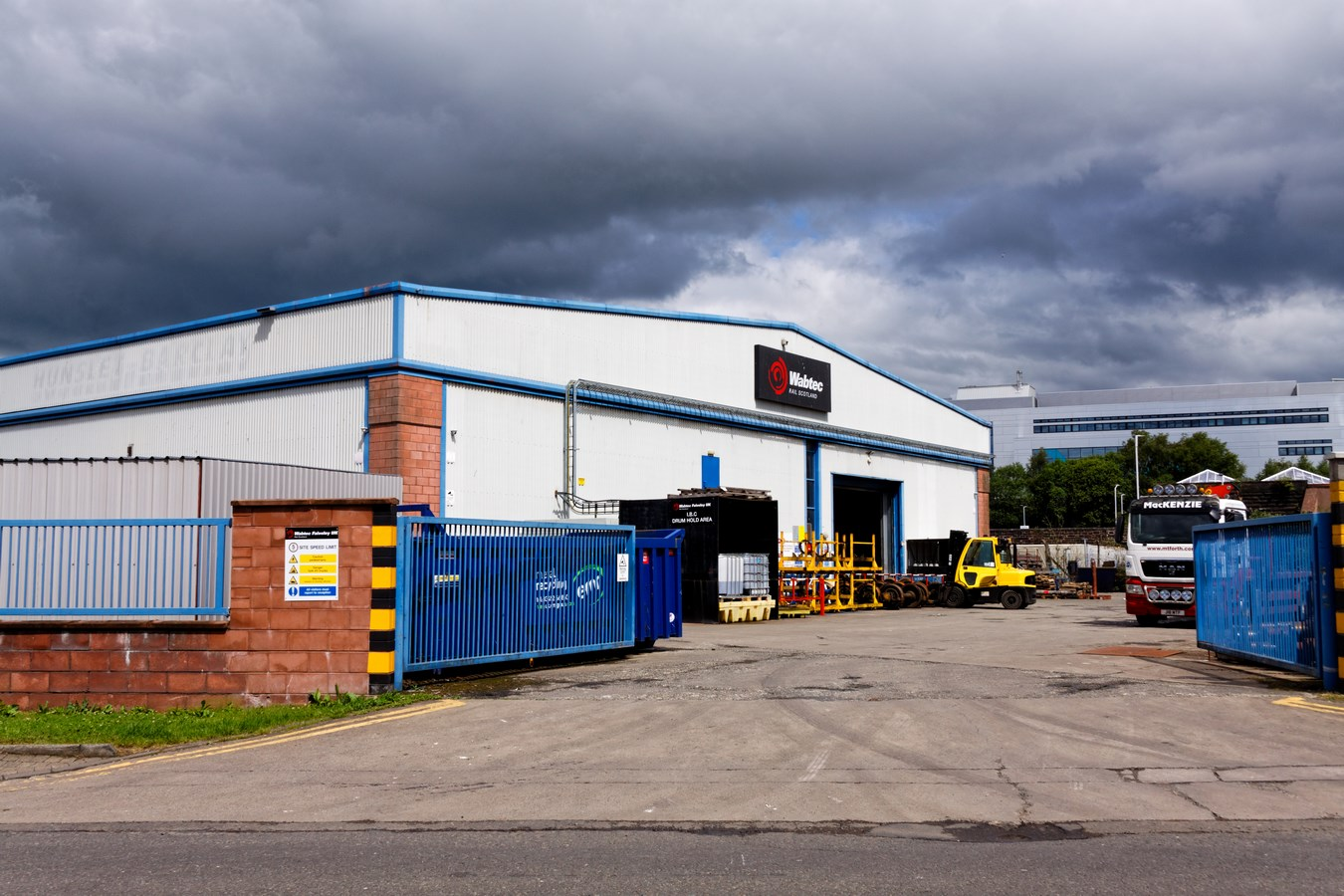
Brodie Engineering railway engineering company, specializing in heavy maintenance, refurbishment and overhauls for both passenger and freight trains

Kilmarnock's traditional industries were based around textiles and heavy engineering such as locomotives (Andrew Barclay Sons & Co) from 1837, and valves (Glenfield and Kennedy), which are still in production. Glenfield and Kennedy is now trading as Glenfield Valves and still operates a base from Kilmarnock, and Andrew Barclay Sons & Co. is now trading as Brodie Engineering. Blackwood's (often known as Blackwood Brothers) produced woollen garments and yarns in Kilmarnock for a number of years, and in 1908, Robert Blackwood formed a partnership with Gavin Morton, establishing Blackwood and Morton of Kilmarnock, which better became known as BMK which specialised in the manufacturing of carpets. Blackwood and Morton of Kilmarnock (BMK) ceased production and closed in 2005, following the closure of Stoddard Carpets and at this time, Stoddard Carpets was the oldest carpet manufacturing company still in operation at that time in Scotland. Carpets manufactured in Kilmarnock were internationally known for their quality and intricacy since the late 19th century. Shoe making was a dominating industry during the height of Kilmarnock's industrial strength, with both Clarks and Saxone Shoes producing shoes from warehouses within the town. The Saxone Shoe factory in Kilmarnock was the largest shoe production factory in operation in Scotland with a staff base of 1,000 employees at the plants peak. Saxone Shoes was bought by the British Sears group and became defunct when Sears sold it to Stylo.

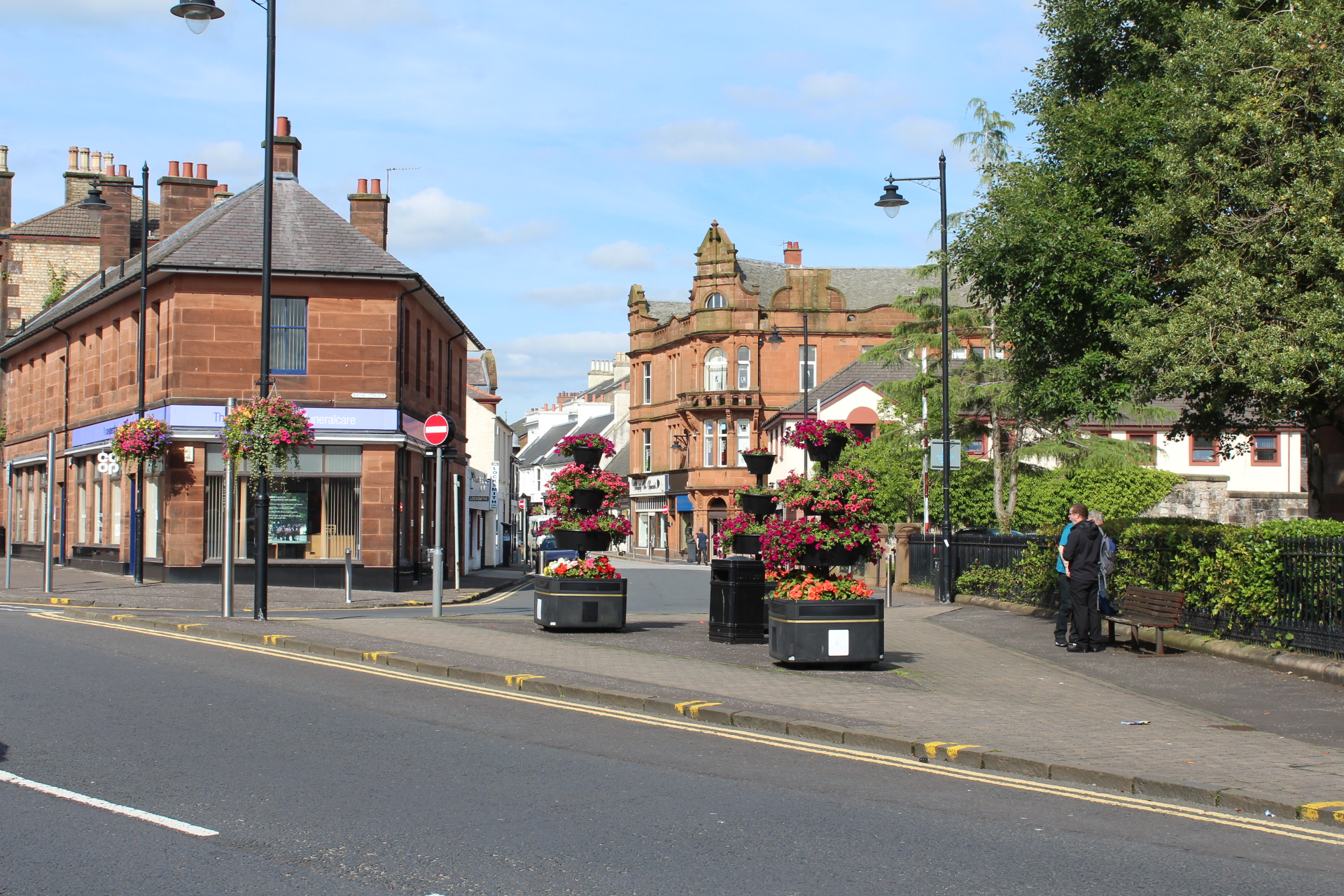
Business premises on Bank Street

Coal was mined within the vicinity of Kilmarnock, with former mines being located within the areas of Grange, Bonnyton and Portland. Quarrying took place at areas such as Dean, Holm and elsewhere, with clay works for bricks and tiles being produced in Gargieston. Clay was also made into sanitary ware at Hillhead, Longpark and Bonnyton, with the produced products being exported extensively from Kilmarnock. Garden produce relied on the establishment and operation of a number of nurseries within Kilmarnock, namely at Westmoor, Holmes, Burnside, New Park and New Pit, despite the towns heavy reliance on heavy industry for economic strength. Kilmarnock had one of the earliest tram railways in the world, running to Troon over the recently restored Laigh Milton viaduct. The Glasgow & South Western Railway set up their works here, producing nearly 400 locomotives by the time it was absorbed by the London, Midland & Scottish Railway in 1923. Some work continued, but heavy repairs were sent to St Rollox. Locomotive repairs finished in 1952, and the works closed in 1959. Nevertheless, locomotives are still made by Brodie Engineering, as well as the maintenance of existing diesel and electric multiple units. From 1949 self-propelled combine harvesters were built in Kilmarnock in a large Massey-Harris factory on the outskirts of the town. It later became Massey Ferguson, and closed in 1980. Glenfield and Kennedy still survives, albeit with a fraction of its former workforce, which at its height numbered in the thousands.

== Health care ==
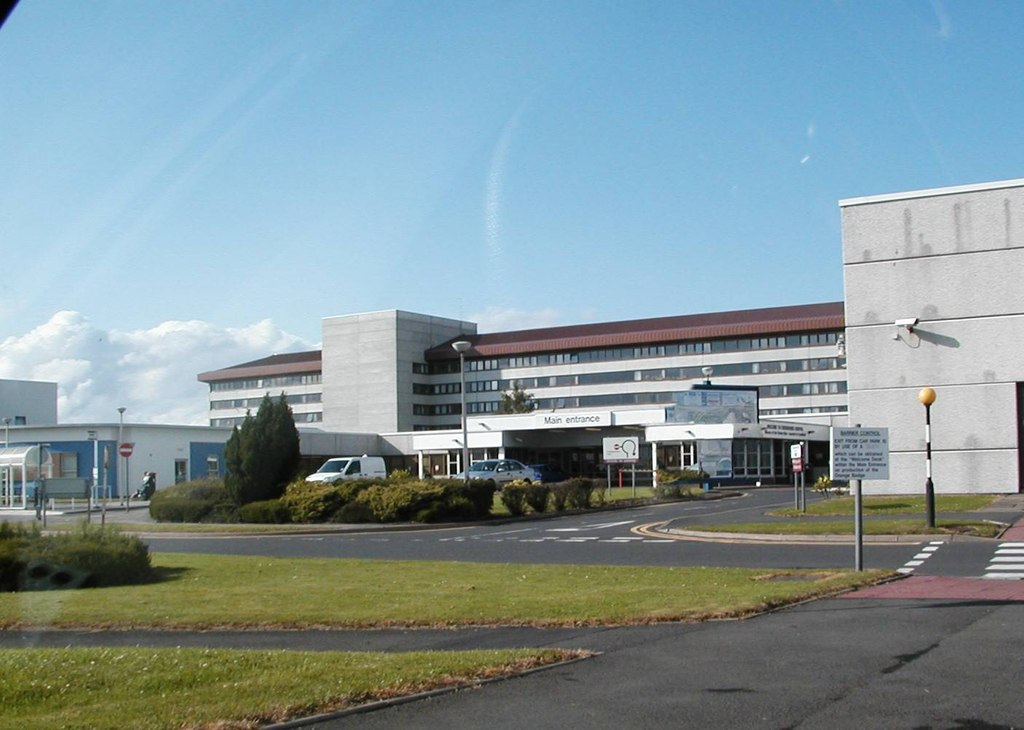
University Hospital Crosshouse, Kilmarnock's main hospital and largest within NHS Ayrshire and Arran

Kilmarnock is served by NHS Ayrshire and Arran, one of fourteen regions of NHS Scotland. NHS Ayrshire and Arran was formed in 2004, with Kilmarnock being served by NHS Ayrshire and Arran's largest hospital, University Hospital Crosshouse, situated less than one mile outwith Kilmarnock between the town and neighbour village Crosshouse.

The town was previously served by the Kilmarnock Infirmary which opened in 1868 in Portland Street, to meet the growing population of the town. The original building was designed by the prolific Kilmarnock architect, William Atkinson Railton. The foundation stone was laid in September 1867 and the building opened in October 1868. A children's block and a nurses' training school were added in 1891. In 1923 it had a capacity of 130 beds. With hospital services transferred to Crosshouse Hospital, the infirmary building and the accident and emergency building were demolished in the late 1980s. The listed nurses' home was demolished under a Dangerous Building Notice in September 1997.

Work on University Hospital Crosshouse, which was commissioned to replace the Kilmarnock Infirmary, began on the site in August 1972 with completion expected in May 1977. The contractor, Melville Dundas & Whitson, encountered difficulties with the water supply and ventilation systems and the facility was only officially opened by George Younger, Secretary of State for Scotland, as Crosshouse Hospital in June 1984. Services provided at University Hospital Crosshouse include an Emergency Department covering both East Ayrshire and North Ayrshire, Maternity Unit (covering the whole of the Ayrshire region), paediatric inpatient services, a Combined Assessment Unit and Ayrshire Doctors on Call (ADOC).

A new maternity unit, which replaced a similar facility at Ayrshire Central Hospital in Irvine was opened in the grounds of the hospital in 2006. In March 2012, the hospital officially became University Hospital Crosshouse as a result of a partnership with the University of the West of Scotland.

Kirklandside Hospital, in neighbouring village Hurlford closed between 2018 and 2020. Kirklandside hospital provided consultant-led services for frail elderly patients. It had 25 long-stay beds for inpatient care and a day hospital which provided assessment and rehabilitation facilities. Kilmarnock is served by a number of general practice (GP) surgeries under NHS Scotland and a variety of other healthcare services including dental treatment and pharmacies.

== Transport ==
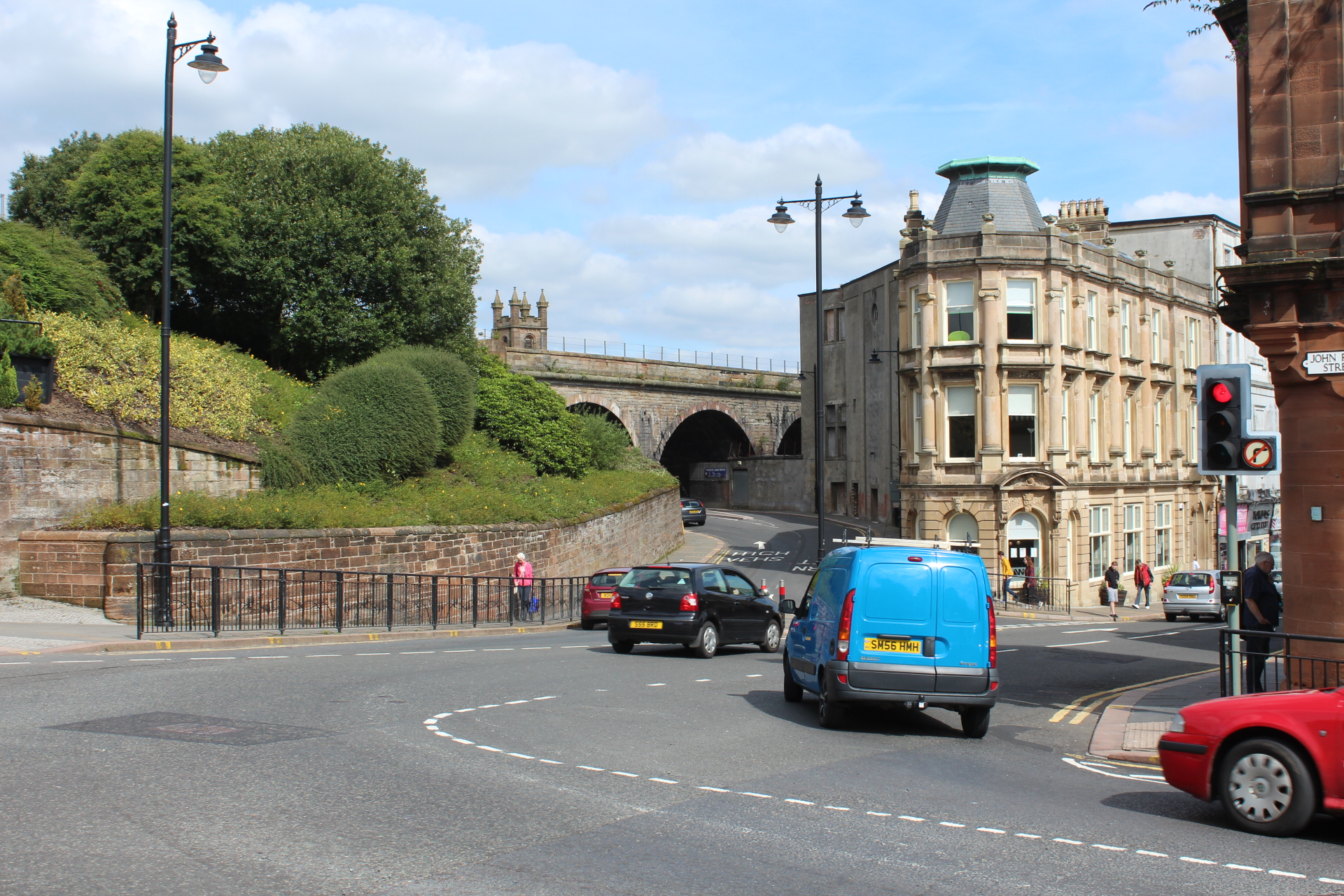
Vehicles on Garden Street, with the railway viaduct in the centre

Until the 18th century, means of transportation in and around Kilmarnock relied on rough tracks which were narrow, twisting and, at times, impassable, to link the town with neighbouring settlements. The Ayrshire Turnpike Act 1767 was passed which allowed for the rough tracks to be expanded in width and improved by turnpike trusts who additionally held responsibility for the maintenance of roads. Following the 1767 act, numerous new and improved roads were completed in the town, such as roads linking Kilmarnock with Ayr, Irvine, Kilmaurs, Stewarton, Kingswell and Flockbridge. An additional act, the Ayrshire Turnpike Act 1774, named a total of 39 new roads for Ayrshire, and included several roads in and around Kilmarnock to link the town with Symington, Riccarton, Dundonald and Hurlford. Improved roads around the town had a positive effect on trade and business in Kilmarnock. By the start of the 19th century, William Bentinck, 4th Duke of Portland, wanted "the best way" to transport coal between Kilmarnock and the seaside settlement of Troon for onward shipping.

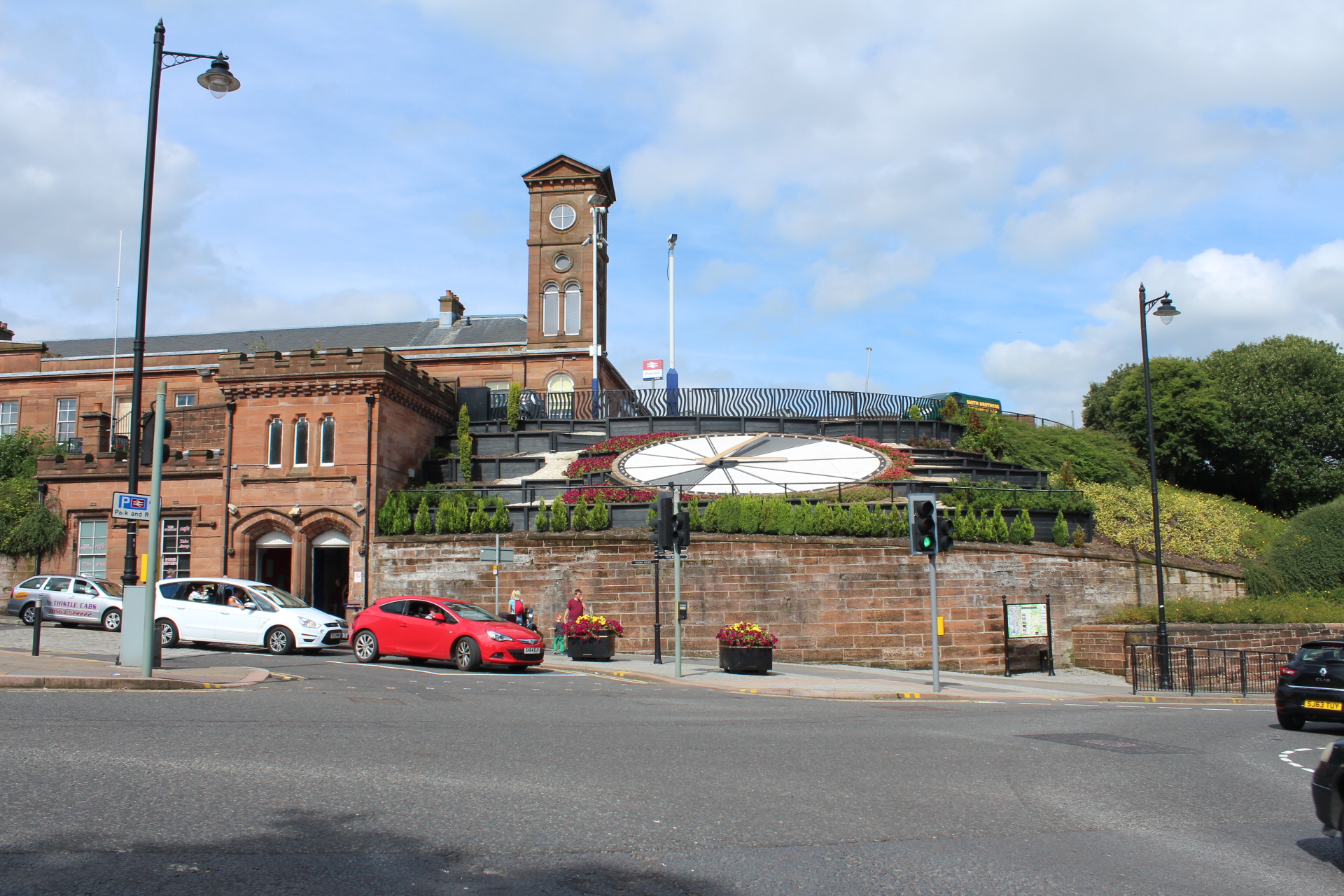
Kilmarnock railway station

In 1812, the Kilmarnock and Troon Railway opened, the first railway in Scotland, mainly to carry coal from the area to the harbour at Troon, but also had a regular passenger service provided prior to the construction work being complete. In 1904, Kilmarnock built its own tramway system, the Kilmarnock Corporation Tramways. An electric power station was built on the south bank of the River Irvine at Riccarton and overhead power lines and tram lines were laid. With continued upgrading and expansion, the tram network at its peak went from Ayr Road in Riccarton at its southerly point, to Knockinlaw Road in Beansburn in the north.

Today the town is served by Kilmarnock railway station, which operates services from the town to all major locations in Scotland connecting with Stranraer for the ferries to the Port of Belfast as well as Larne Harbour in Northern Ireland and as far as Carlisle and Newcastle in England. Despite an expensive upgrade to the railway station clock in 2008, it was announced in December 2022 following a full cabinet meeting of East Ayrshire Council that the station clock was to be removed and landscaped "with immediate affect" due to continuous technical difficulties preventing the clock and its LED lighting from working properly.

The town's "Transport Station" for bus travel opened in 1923, and was among the first custom–built bus stations in Scotland. It remained the town's main bus station until 1974 when it was replaced by a new bus station, which itself has been upgraded extensively through 2021–2024.

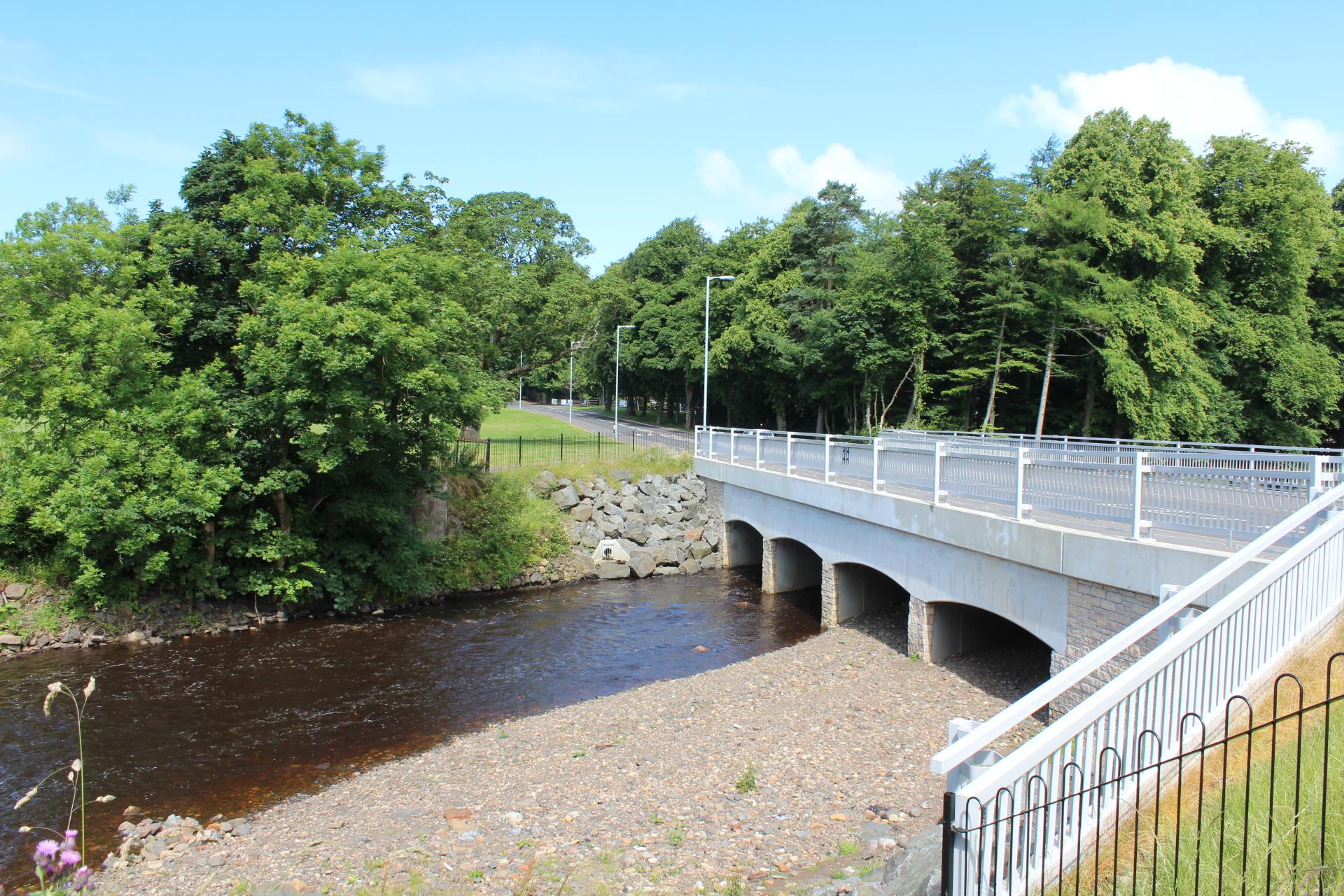
Dean Bridge

Kilmarnock has road links to Glasgow through the M77 motorway from Fenwick to its junction with the M8 at the Kingston Bridge. A south side motorway connects this point to the M74 near Calderpark when the latest phase of development is complete, eliminating some of the heavy traffic formerly travelling on the A71 through Hurlford, Galston, Newmilns, Darvel and Strathaven to join the M74 at Stonehouse.

Stagecoach Group is the main transport provider in the town; it operates bus services to most major towns in the west of Scotland. Kilmarnock has its own bus station. As an early market town, Kilmarnock lies on the intersection of 3 main roads: the A71 which runs from Edinburgh to Irvine, the A76 from Dumfries, and the A77/M77 from Stranraer to Glasgow.

Kilmarnock has no international airport, however, the town, as well as surrounding settlements in the area, is served by nearby Glasgow Prestwick Airport (14 mi).

== Education ==
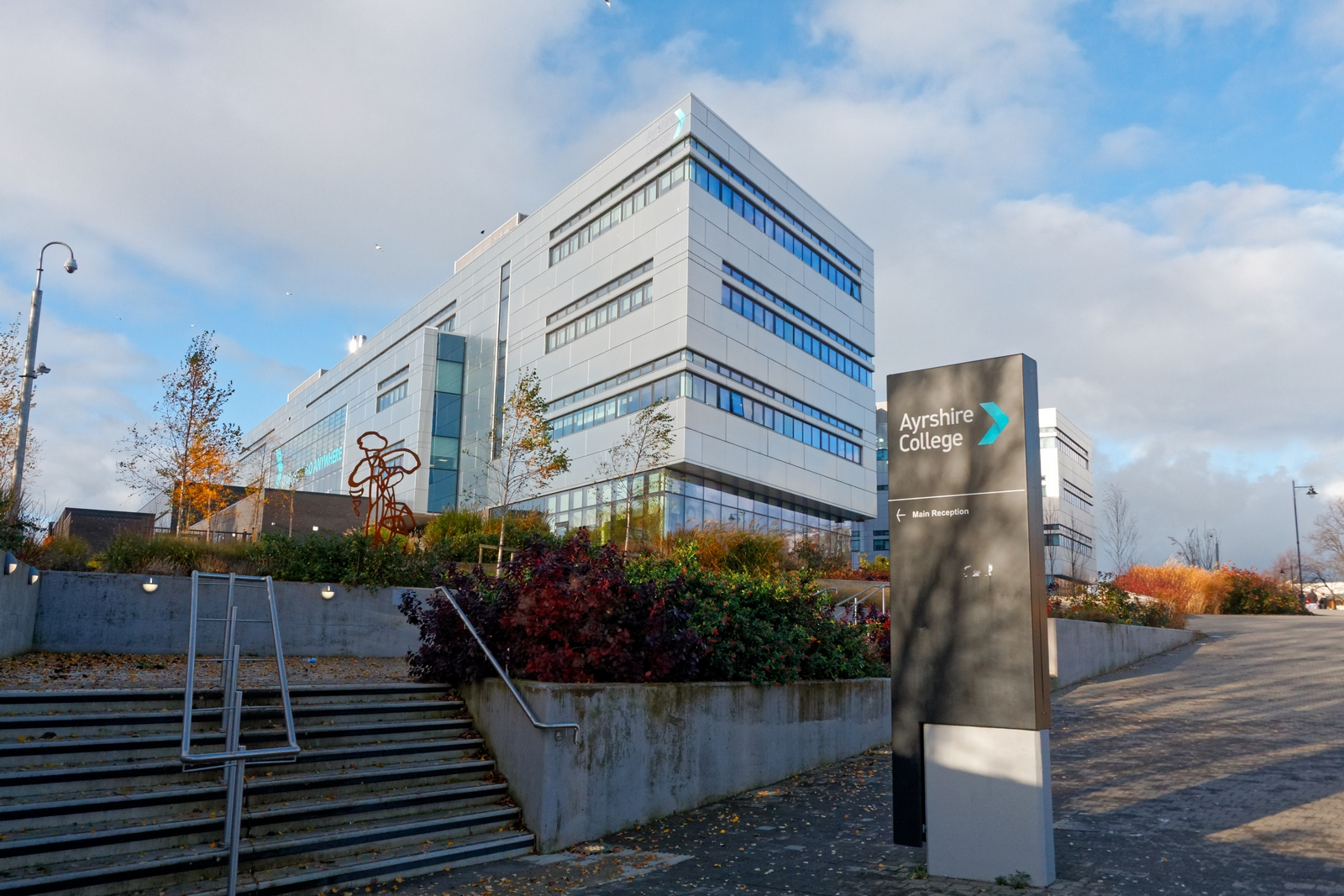
Kilmarnock campus of Ayrshire College

Kilmarnock has ten primary schools, three secondary schools (Kilmarnock Academy, Grange Academy and Saint Josephs' Academy) and thirteen nursery schools. The schools are managed by East Ayrshire Council. Further education in the town is provided by Ayrshire College, previously known as Kilmarnock College and, prior to that, Kilmarnock Technical College.

The town's oldest secondary school Kilmarnock Academy dates back to the 1600s. The school in its present-day serves as a comprehensive school, one of three in Kilmarnock. It can trace its history back to the local burgh school founded in the 1630s and the first school to bear the name was established in 1876. Kilmarnock Academy is one of a small number of schools in the United Kingdom, and was the first school in Scotland, to have educated two Nobel Prize Laureates – Sir Alexander Fleming, discoverer of Penicillin, and The 1st Baron Boyd-Orr, for his scientific research into nutrition and his work as the first Director-General of the United Nations Food and Agriculture Organization (FAO). Grange Academy in the Bonnyton area of the town, is one of only seven Scottish Football Association (SFA) Performance Schools.

Loanhead Primary School was founded as Loanhead Public School, and was erected between 1903 and 1905 to accommodate primary aged pupils in the eastern part of Kilmarnock. The foundation stone was laid by Andrew Carnegie on 29 August 1903 before opening to pupils in 1905, and the building is a Category B listed building by Historic Environment Scotland At a construction cost of £15,000, Loanhead Public School was to become the seventh primary school built by the Kilmarnock School Board, as before the introduction of the Education (Scotland) Act 1872, pupils were either educated by schools operated by churches, private individuals or parish councils. Loanhead Primary School underwent a multi-mullion pound programme of investment between 2020 and 2021 to modernise the building and include provision for early years education within the town centre area of Kilmarnock.

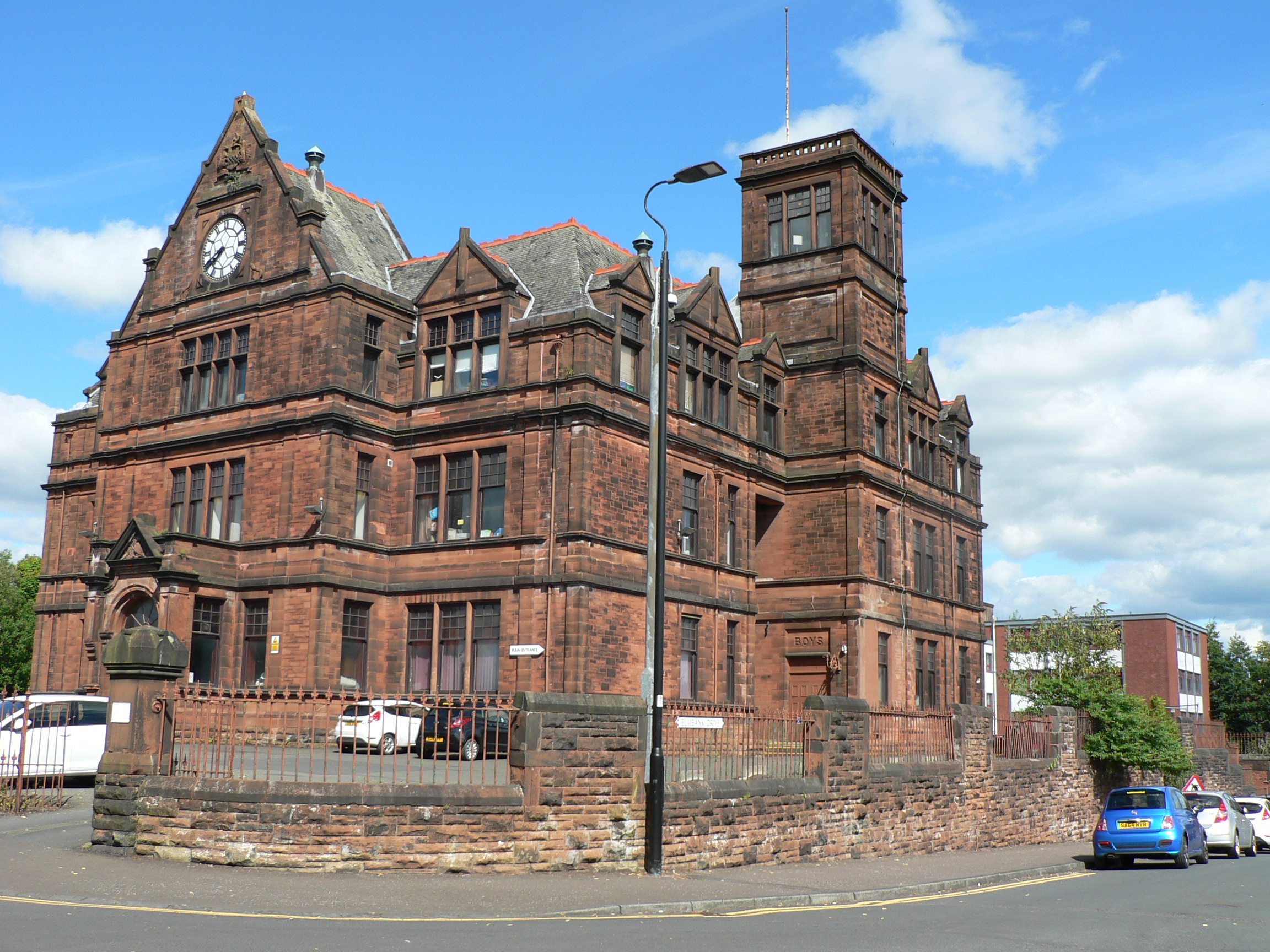
Kilmarnock Academy educated two Nobel laureates – Alexander Fleming, discoverer of Penicillin, and John Boyd Orr, 1st Baron Boyd-Orr

In the years that followed the establishment of Loanhead Primary School in 1905, due to the towns growth and expansion, new primary schools were opened, including Shortlees Primary School (1951), Mount Carmel Primary School (1965), Annanhill Primary School (1973), St Matthew's Primary School (1973), Gargieston Primary School (1975), Whatriggs Primary School (2017). Other primary schools to have been established in Kilmarnock since Loanhead include Silverwood Primary School, Onthank Primary School, Hillhead Primary School, Bellfield Primary School and Kirkstyle Primary School. Their dates of establishment remain unclear.

Early Childhood Centres

- Cairns Early Childhood Centre
- Dean Park Nursery (private establishment in partnership with East Ayrshire Council)
- Flowerbank Early Childhood Centre
- Gaelic Early Childhood Centre
- Gargieston Early Childhood Centre
- Hillbank Early Childhood Centre
- James Hamilton Early Childhood Centre
- Onthank Early Childhood Centre
- Riccarton Early Childhood Centre
- Shortlees Early Childhood Centre
- St Andrew's Early Childhood Centre
- Whatriggs Early Childhood Centre
- Loanhead Early Childhood Centre

Primary schools

- Annanhill Primary School
- Gargieston Primary School
- Hillhead Primary School
- Loanhead Primary School
- James Hamilton Primary School
- Mount Carmel Primary School
- Onthank Primary School
- Shortlees Primary School
- St Andrew's Primary School
- Whatriggs Primary School

Secondary Schools

- Kilmarnock Academy
- Grange Academy
- Saint Josephs' Academy

Special Schools

- Park School
- Willowbank School

Further education

- Ayrshire College (Kilmarnock Campus)

== Culture ==
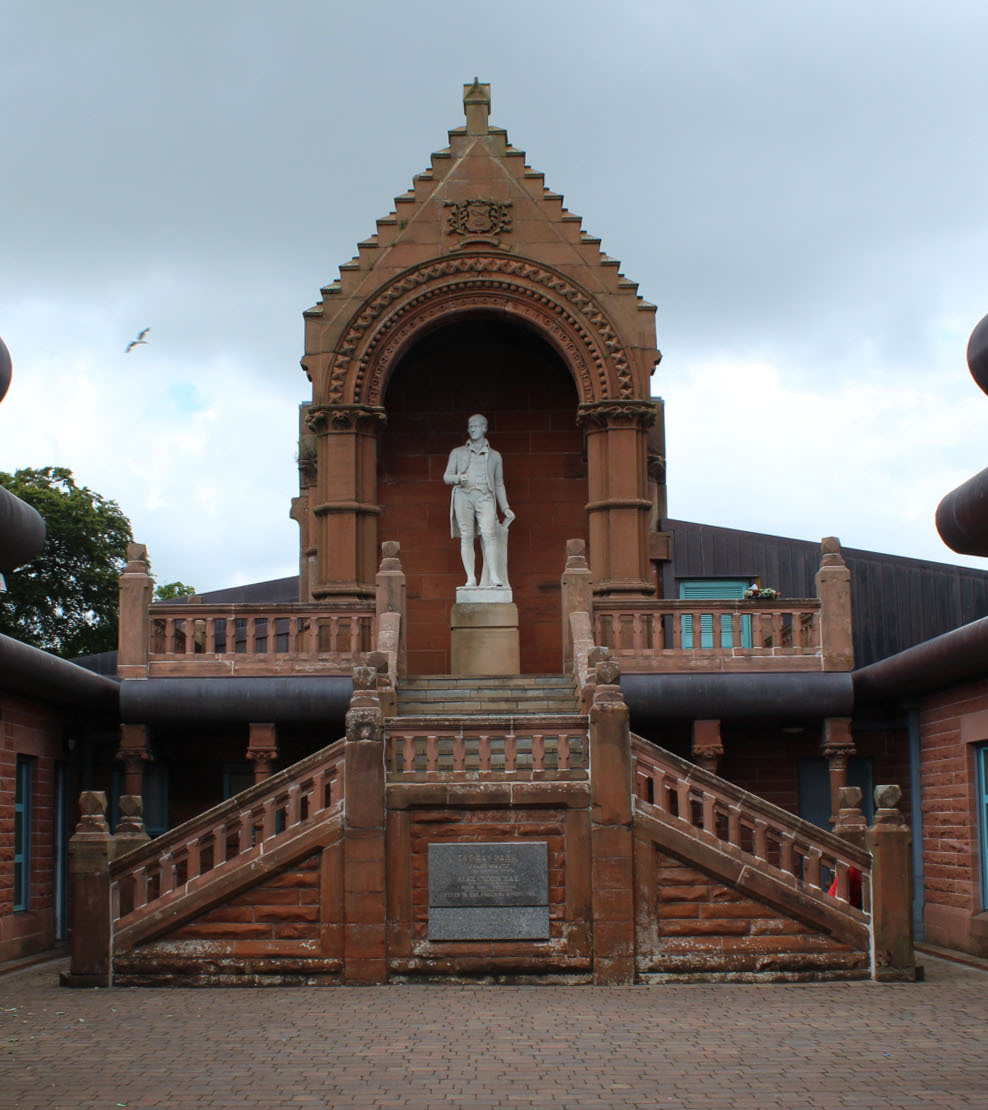
Statue of Robert Burns at the Burns Monument Centre located in the Kay Park

Kilmarnock boasts a large number of listed buildings. The Dick Institute, opened in April 1901, was severely damaged by fire only eight years after it opened. Some of the museums collections were lost in the fire. It reopened two years after the fire in 1911. The Dick Institute was used as an Auxiliary Hospital in 1917 during World War One. It is now shared by the Arts and Museums Service, and the Libraries, Registration and Information Service. The two Art Galleries and three Museum Galleries house permanent and temporary displays of Fine Art, Contemporary Art and Craft, Local and Industrial History and Natural Sciences. The Lending Library, Audio Library, Junior Library, Reference Library, and Learning Centre are all housed on the ground floor.

The first collection of work by Scottish poet Robert Burns, Poems, Chiefly in the Scottish Dialect was published in Kilmarnock on 31 July 1786. It was published at the current site of the Burn's Mall, dedicated to his work. This edition is known as the Kilmarnock Edition or Kilmarnock Volume. To commemorate Burns' association with the town, a statue of Burns and John Wilson, publisher of the Kilmarnock Edition, was erected at The Cross in the town centre and was unveiled by Anne, Princess Royal on 27 September 1995. The Burns Monument in the towns Kay Park was opened on 9 August 1879 and contained a museum of artefacts. Designed by Robert Ingram, the monument cost an estimated £2,892 to build and contained a marble statue of Robert Burns which was designed by W. G. Stevenson, as well as a tower which features rooms that could be visited by the public. When closed for renovations, the monument suffered a severe fire on 20 November 2004, with much of the original structure collapsing. The monument was partially reconstructed and re-opened as the Burns Monument Centre.

The ancestors of William Wallace held the Barony of Ricarton, where the suburb of Riccarton is now located, and, according to local tradition, Wallace was born at Ellerslie near Kilmarnock. John Bowring, polyglot and fourth governor of Hong Kong, was Member of Parliament for Kilmarnock in 1835. In the castle of Kilmarnock, Dean Castle, there is an exhibition of armour and weapons, and the Van Raalte collection of musical instruments.

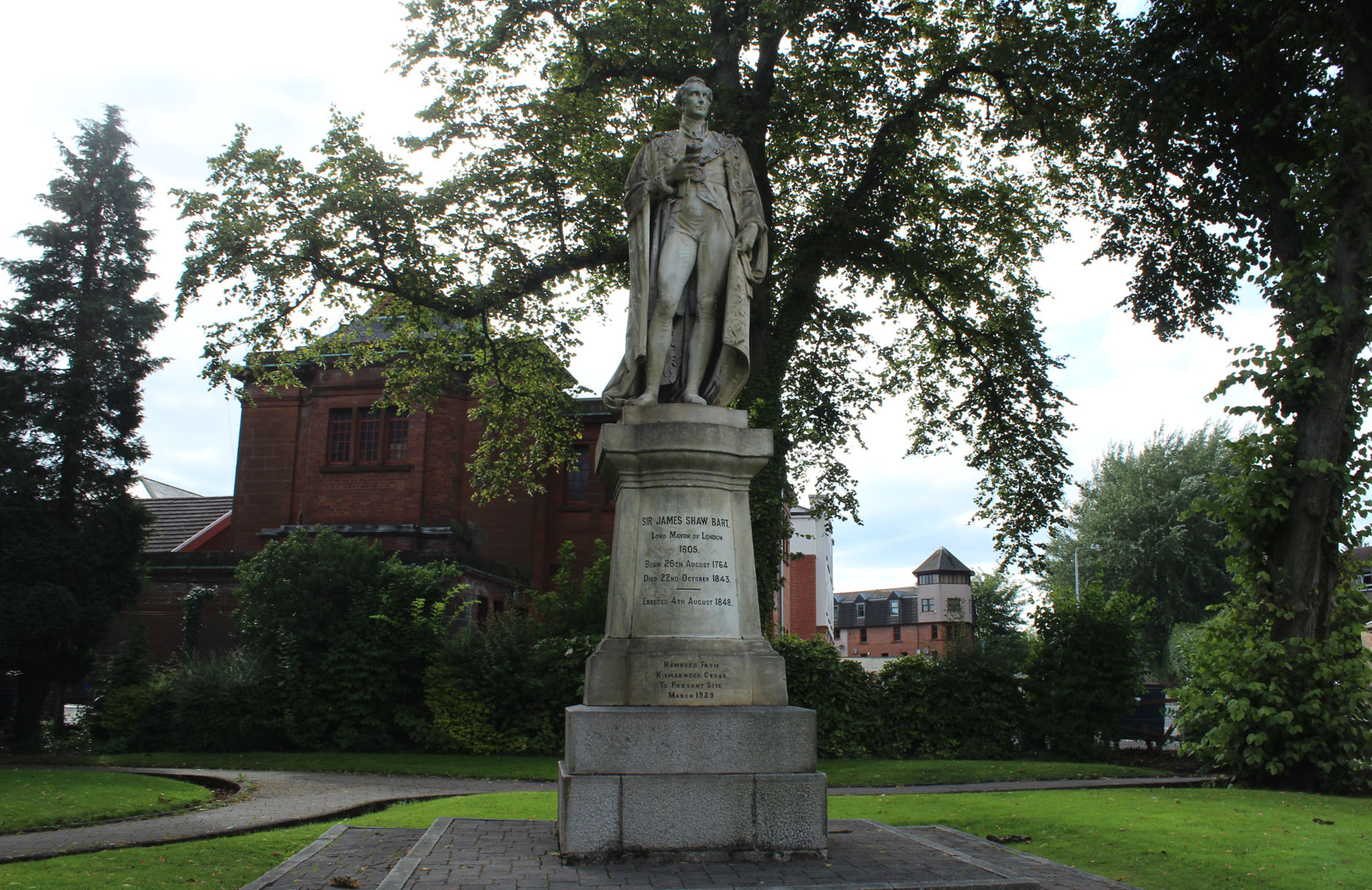
Statue of Sir James Shaw, 1st Baronet, Lord Mayor of London (1805–1806), who originated from the town

In 2010, BBC Scotland filmed residents on the town's Onthank and Longpark area for the TV programme The Scheme which broadcast in 2010 for two episodes so far, out of a planned four. The Scheme caused much controversy within residents of the community, who believed that the BBC only showed the "worst parts", leading to others believing that they were "pretty much the same". The series has been the subject of media criticism, with the series being labelled as "poverty porn" and described as giving a "misleading impression" of life on the estate. The final two episodes of the series were never broadcast due to legal issues.

Scottish duo The Proclaimers titled a song "The Joyful Kilmarnock Blues" on their debut album, This Is the Story, released in 1987, as a reference to the town. Additionally, "The Ballroom Blitz" by the band The Sweet was inspired by an event at the town's Grand Hall music venue, when, in 1973, the band were performing at the venue and were driven off the stage by a barrage of bottles thrown from the crowd. The song went onto achieve worldwide fame and success, reaching the top ten on both the UK Singles Charts and the Billboard Hot 100 singles charts, with many still talking about the concept behind the song. In October 2022, the town's Grand Hall played host to the 2022 BBC New Comedy Award.

=== Sports ===
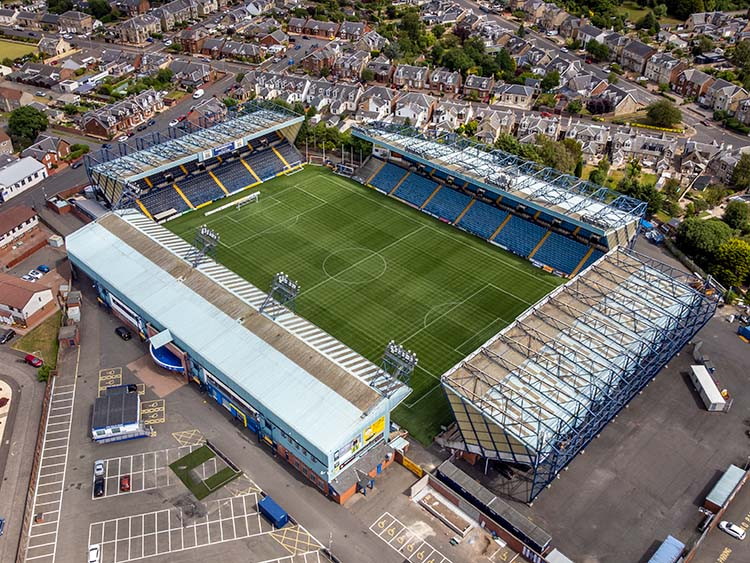
Rugby Park, home of Kilmarnock F.C.

The town is host to Kilmarnock F.C., a member of the Scottish Premiership and the oldest professional football club in Scotland. The club is one of eight founding members of the Scottish Football Association in 1873. Although not able to send a representative to the meeting which established the association, Kilmarnock F.C. did send a letter of willingness to join, and did so in time to compete in the inaugural Scottish Cup tournament in 1873–74. Their 2–0 defeat against Renton in the first round on 18 October 1873 is thought to have been the first match ever played in the competition.

There are two golf courses in the town, Annanhill Golf Course and Caprington Golf Course, which has both an 18-hole course and a 9-hole course. Annanhill Golf Course is owned and operated by East Ayrshire Council, while Caprington is privately owned by a community group. The local leisure complexes include the Galleon Centre which features a 25-metre swimming pool, baby pool, ice rink, squash courts, sauna, gym, games hall, bar area and bowling green, as well as the Northwest Centre (formerly the Hunter Centre) which contains a community gym and various local medical facilities. The new Ayrshire Athletics Centre was constructed in the Queens Drive area which includes a 400m running track outside of the main building. The athletics arena was used as part of the 2014 Commonwealth Games as a pre–games training ground for athletes from across the Commonwealth of Nations.

One of the towns secondary schools, Grange Academy, is a Scottish Football Association (SFA) performance school. Only six other performance schools are established in Scotland – Aberdeen, Dundee, Edinburgh, Falkirk, Glasgow and Motherwell.

=== Twin towns – sister cities ===
Kilmarnock – as part of East Ayrshire Council – is twinned with five cities and has received awards from the Council of Europe for its work in twinning.

- Alès, France;
- Herstal, Belgium;
- Joué-lès-Tours, France;
- Kulmbach, Germany;
- Santa Coloma de Gramenet, Spain.

The former Kilmarnock and Loudoun District Council is also twinned with Sukhumi, Abkhazia (Russian-occupied Georgia) on the Black Sea coast. Following a review of links, this link is now considered as a friendship link.

== Notable and associated people ==
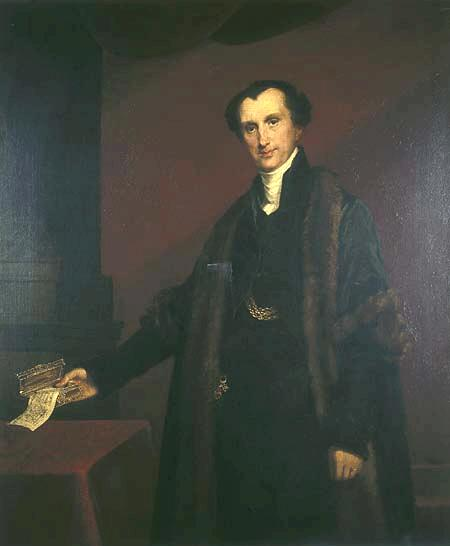
Portrait of Sir James Shaw, 1st Baronet (1764–1843), Lord Mayor of London and Member of Parliament for London. (artist Mary Martha Pearson)

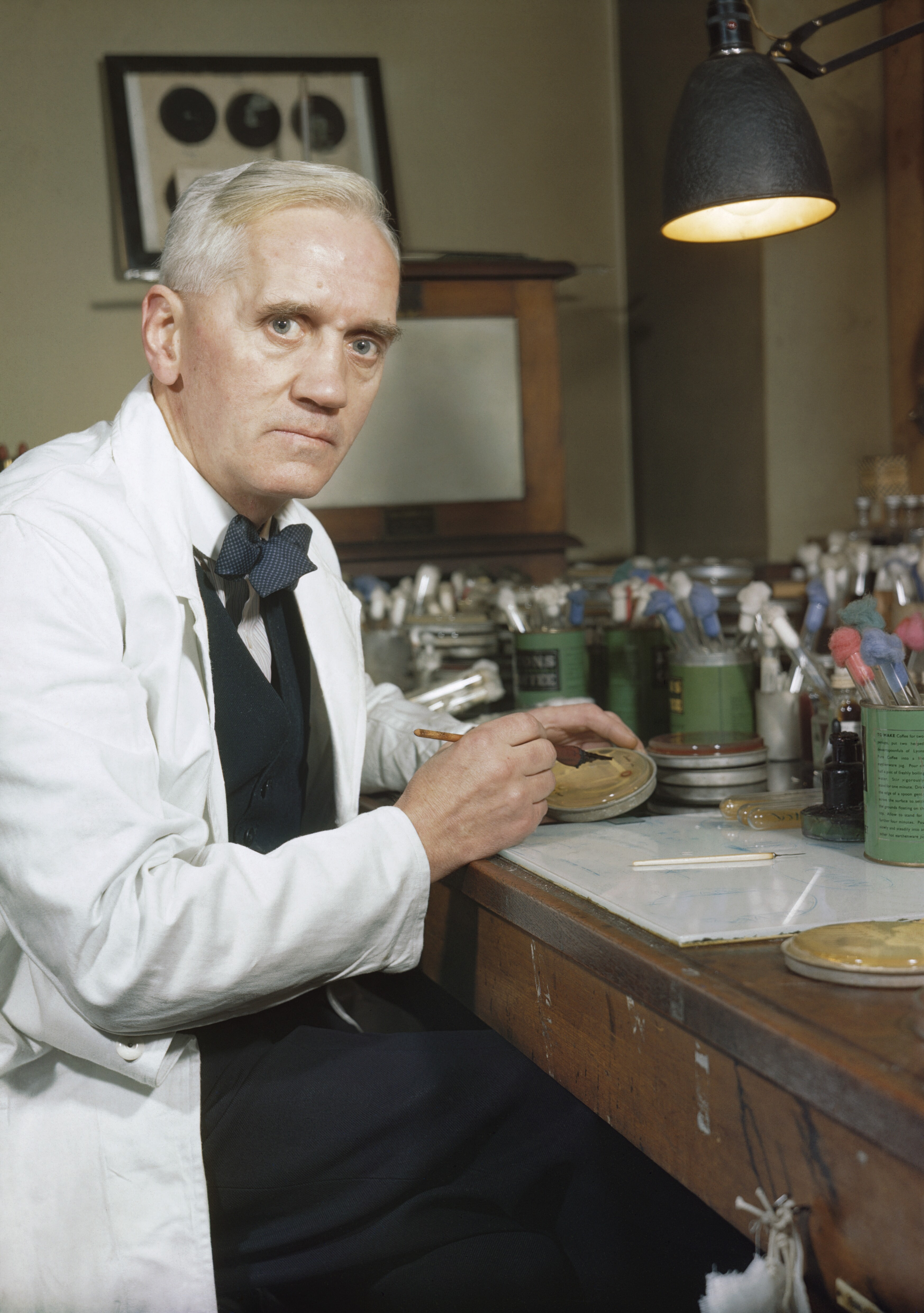
Sir Alexander Fleming, discoverer of Penicillin, was born in nearby Darvel and attended Kilmarnock Academy

Below is a list of those who have either been born, lived in or have been associated with the town of Kilmarnock at some point of their life:

Literature and arts

- Gilbert Adair; writer
- Steven Brown; artist best known for his McCoo artwork
- Robert Colquhoun; painter, printmaker and theatre set designer
- Steven Cree, actor, best known for his role in Outlander and Outlaw King.
- Fatherson, three piece alternative rock band formed in the town, with the three members having resided in the town and been educated at local schools in Kilmarnock
- Clark Sorley, record producer
- James Prime, member of the band Deacon Blue
- James Buckley who starred as Jay Cartwright in The Inbetweeners resided in Kilmarnock for a period of time with his wife.
- John Kelso Hunter; 19th-century oil painter and author
- Chris Kelso; writer, illustrator, editor and journalist
- Kirsty McCabe; weather presenter and meteorologist BBC, ITV, Channel 5 and Sky News
- Malky McCormick; cartoonist
- Iain McDowall; crime writer
- Hugh McIlvanney; sports journalist
- William McIlvanney; writer, born 1936 and known for his series of books Laidlaw
- James McKie, printer and publisher
- Colin Mochrie; comedian
- William and John Sloane; founders of W. & J. Sloane in New York City.
- Mike Ogletree; drummer and percussionist
- Kirsty Wark; TV news journalist and presenter of Newsnight
- Simon Neil: lead vocalist and guitarist for rock band Biffy Clyro.
- James Johnston: bassist, vocalist, and songwriter, best known for his work with Scottish group Biffy Clyro
- Ben Johnston: a drummer, vocalist, songwriter and member of Scottish group Biffy Clyro.

Medicine and science

- John Boyd Orr; biologist, politician and Nobel Peace Prize-winner
- Alexander Fleming; discoverer of penicillin and winner of the Nobel Prize in Physiology or Medicine, attended Kilmarnock Academy
- Robert Thomson Leiper, parasitologist and helminthologist

Businesspeople

- Sir Alexander Walker; creator of Johnnie Walker whisky and son of John "Johnnie" Walker
- John "Johnnie" Walker; originator of Johnnie Walker whisky, grocer, and father of Sir Alexander Walker
- Marie Macklin, CEO of The KLIN Group and founder of The HALO Urban Regeneration
- Gareth Kirkwood; former director of operations at British Airways, current CEO of The Nurture Landscapes Group

Politics

- Ian Deans; Scottish-Canadian NDP politician who represented Hamilton
- James Shaw; Lord Mayor of London in 1805.
- Major General Sir Robert Murdoch Smith, engineer, archaeologist and diplomat

Sports

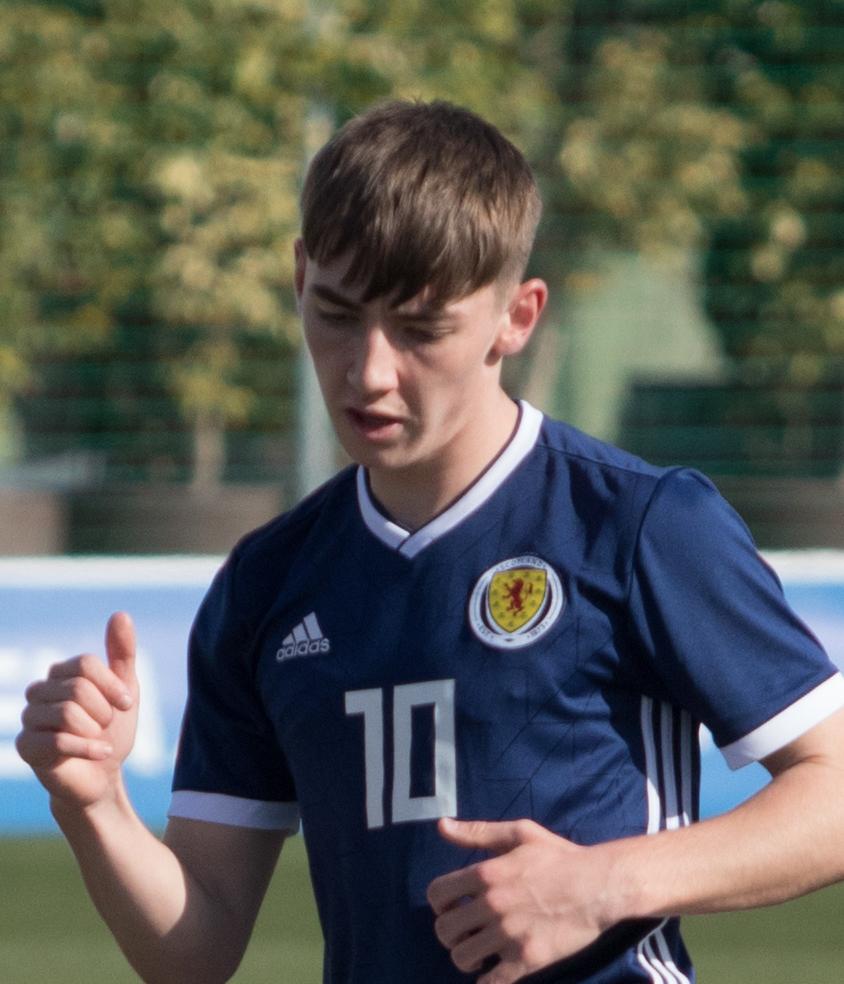
Footballer Billy Gilmour attended the towns Grange Academy

- Jim Brown, footballer
- Joanne Calderwood; flyweight mixed martial artist in the Ultimate Fighting Championship
- Billy Gilmour, footballer for Napoli and the Scotland national football team, attended Grange Academy in the town
- Margaret McDowall; member of the Scottish swimming team and silver medal winner at the 1952 Helsinki Olympics
- Patrick James McKay, Karate-World champion
- Gordon Smith; former professional footballer and former SFA Chief Executive
- Jim Thomson (born 1940), cricketer

Merchants

- William Cunninghame, 18th century merchant and Tobacco Lord
- Charles Ewart; cavalryman who captured a French regimental eagle at the Battle of Waterloo

Religion

- William Hewitt; Moderator of the General Assembly of the Church of Scotland in 2009
- David Lacy; Moderator of the General Assembly of the Church of Scotland and a local minister

Military

- Eleanor Kasrils; first woman recruited into the African National Congress military wing

Other notable people from Kilmarnock

- Duncan Millar, recipient of the Victoria Cross
- Robert Reyburn, orchardist, farmer and politician
- Jim McColl, horticulturalist, television presenter and recipient of the Victoria Medal of Honour

== See also ==
- Dudsday – the old Kilmarnock hiring fair
- The Holy Tulzie – the Rev. John Russell of the High Kirk
