= Musselburgh railway station (disambiguation) =

Musselburgh railway station is a railway station in Musselburgh, Scotland.

Musselburgh railway station may also refer to one of these closed stations that served Musselburgh, Scotland:

- Musselburgh railway station (1847) on the Musselburgh branch
- Inveresk railway station originally opened as Musselburgh railway station in 1846
