= Bloody Scotland =

Scottish international crime writing literary festival

- Genre: Scottish international crime-writing festival
- Begins: 2012
- Frequency: annually
- Venue: varies
- Location: Stirling
- Country: Scotland, U.K.
- Inaugurated: 2012 (14 years ago)
- Founders: Lin Anderson; Alex Gray
- Most recent: 18–20 September 2026
- Next event: 17–19 September 2027
- Website: bloodyscotland.com

Bloody Scotland is a Scottish international crime-writing festival, held annually in Stirling, Scotland, United Kingdom.

== History and operations ==
Th festival was founded in 2012 by Tartan Noir writers Lin Anderson and Alex Gray and describes itself as "the literary festival where you can let down your hair and enjoy a drink at the bar with your favourite crime writer". Its sponsors include the University of Stirling and Stirling Council.

In 2022, most events were held at the Albert Halls or the Tolbooth.

The festival awards The McIlvanney Prize for "the best Scottish Crime book of the year" (so named in 2016 for writer William McIlvanney (1936–2015), who has been called "the Godfather of Tartan Noir"), and, since 2019, the Bloody Scotland Scottish Crime Debut of the Year.

Since 2012, the festival has also run an annual Pitch Perfect event, giving emerging crime writers the opportunity to pitch work-in-progress novels to a panel of publishing-industry experts. Several winners have gone on to publication and acclaim, including 2021 Pitch Perfect winner Kate Foster, whose novel The Maiden went on to win Scottish Crime Debut of the Year in 2023 and longlisted for the 2024 Women's Prize for Fiction.

== McIlvanney Prize winners ==
- 2012: Charles Cumming, A Foreign Country
- 2013: Malcolm Mackay, How a Gunman Says Goodbye
- 2014: Peter May, Entry Island
- 2015: Craig Russell, The Ghosts of Altona
- 2016: Chris Brookmyre, Black Widow
- 2017: Denise Mina, The Long Drop
- 2018: Liam McIlvanney (son of William McIlvanney),The Quaker
- 2019: Manda Scott, A Treachery of Spies (the winner chose to share the prize with the other shortlisted authors: Doug Johnstone, Denise Mina and Ambrose Parry)
- 2020: Francine Toon, Pine
- 2021: Craig Russell, Hyde
- 2022: Alan Parks, May God Forgive
- 2023: Callum McSorley, Squeaky Clean
- 2024: Chris Brookmyre, The Cracked Mirror
- 2025: Tariq Ashkanani, The Midnight King

== Scottish Crime Debut of the Year winners ==
- 2019: Claire Askew, All the Hidden Truths
- 2020: Deborah Masson, Hold Your Tongue
- 2021: Robbie Morrison, Edge of the Grave
- 2022: Tariq Ashkanani, Welcome to Cooper
- 2023: Kate Foster, The Maiden
- 2024: Allan Gaw, The Silent House of Sleep.
- 2025: David Goodman, A Reluctant Spy

== Pitch Perfect winners ==
- 2012: Joseph Knox
- 2013: Alex Cox
- 2014: Margaret Stewart
- 2015: Matt Wesolowski
- 2016: Alison Belsham
- 2017: Mark Wightman
- 2018: C O Vollmer (David Bishop)
- 2019: Suzy Aspley
- 2020: Kate Foster
- 2021: Kris Haddow
- 2022: Joel Rakos
- 2023: Shane McGinley
- 2024: Alys Cummings

== See also ==
- List of festivals in the United Kingdom
- List of literary festivals
