= Europe Sees Syria =

International activist campaign

- Europe Sees Syria's logo
- Formation: 2 September 2015
- Type: Social Media
- Purpose: Helping refugees and tackling European refugee crisis
- Founder: Alexis Stearns

Europe Sees Syria is an international activist campaign that began in Glasgow, Scotland after the death of Alan Kurdi whose image made global headlines after he drowned in the Mediterranean Sea, as part of the Syrian refugee crisis. The Europe Sees Syria campaign works to help refugees and tackling European refugee crisis. The campaign was founded as a Facebook page by Alexis Stearns. Although the activists run a stable social media pages, the overall Europe Sees Syria movement is a decentralised network, and has no formal hierarchy or structure.

== Description and events ==
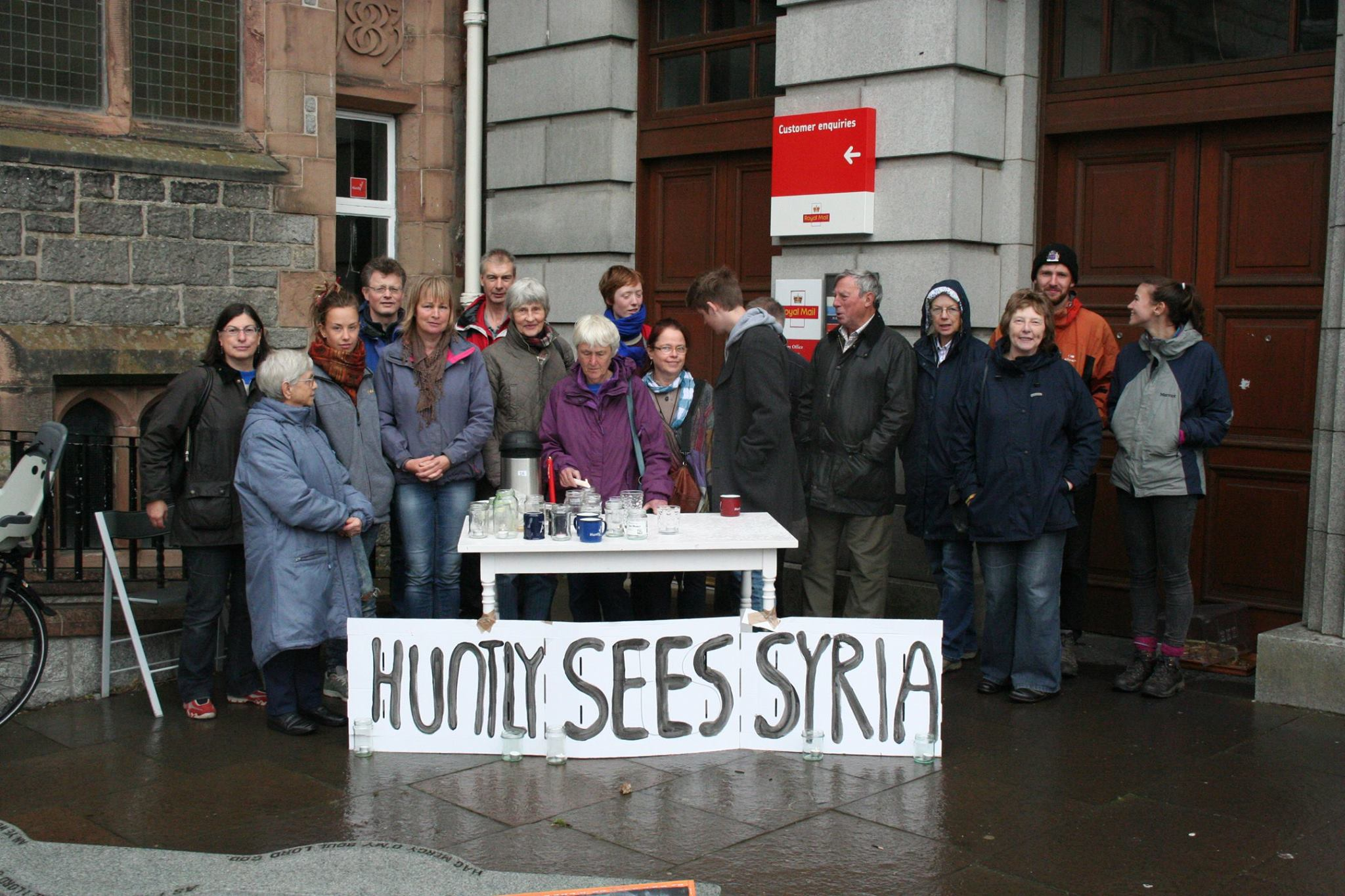
Refugee vigil in Huntly, Aberdeenshire, Scotland.

The movement began after the death of Alan Kurdi whose image made global headlines after he drowned in the Mediterranean Sea, as part of the Syrian refugee crisis. Candlelight vigils in Scotland were organized through Facebook by Alexis Stearns to show solidarity for Syrian refugees and the victims of war. Alexis Stearns stated that "as a wealthy country, many of our citizens want to register their disgust at how little our government is doing to tackle a very serious situation. We hope that other towns and cities will now be inspired to launch events so that we can send a message from every corner of the world."

More than 200,000 people have signed a nationwide petition calling on the UK Government to accept more asylum seekers and increase support for refugees. The Catholic Church in Scotland, the Church of Scotland, the Muslim Council of Scotland, and the Scottish Council of Jewish Communities have issued an Interfaith statement on the refugee crisis part of which reads ‘We welcome the UK and Scottish governments’ willingness to offer a safe haven to these desperate people. We urge them to back this with practical action to help as many refugees as possible, and we call on our communities to support this and make them welcome’.

== Influence ==
St Mary's Cathedral in Glasgow hosted "Glasgow Hears Syria", a musical response to the refugee crisis. Funds raised by the event split between Amnesty International and the Migrant Offshore Aid Agency.

== List of events ==
Date	Organiser(s)	Location	Attendance	Description and aftermath
9 September 2015	Maria Escalona	Valencia, Spain	1,000	
12 September 2015	Alexis Stearns, Fuad Alakbarov, Marie Clare Lacey, Adam Stearns, Joshua Brown	Glasgow, Scotland	10,000	The event took place in Glasgow's George Square. The crowd was addressed by Humza Yousaf, Scotland's Minister for Europe and International Development, who said the picture of Aylan Kurdi, the three-year-old Syrian refugee whose body was found on a Turkish beach, had “seared into the collective consciousness of the whole world”.
12 September 2015	Amer Scott Masri, Keefe McKie, Stefan and Kirstin Unger, Mike Lavin	Edinburgh, Scotland	5,000	The event took place on front of Scottish Parliament. People attending the Edinburgh event then joined a silent walk over the Radical Road along the Crags.
12 September 2015	Mairi Stephen	Inverness, Scotland	Unknown	The event took place at the High Street of the city.
12 September 2015	Helen Malone	Aberdeen, Scotland	Unknown	The event took place in Aberdeen's Union Terrace Gardens.
12 September 2015	Mairi McTaggart	Dundee, Scotland	60	The event took place at the Campus Green of the Dundee University.
12 September 2015	Savi Maharaj	Stirling, Scotland	Unknown	Scotland's best-selling authors including Val McDermid, Lin Anderson, Alex Gray and Denise Mina were among hundreds who attended a Stirling Sees Syria candle-lit vigil in support of refugees.
12 September 2015	Wendy Sinclair	Lerwick, Scotland	70	70 people gathered at Lerwick Market Cross at midday on Saturday for an hour-long candlelight vigil to demonstrate their solidarity with refugees.
12 September 2015	Unknown	Linlithgow, Scotland	Unknown	
12 September 2015	Jeni Orjeni, Hayley Keane	Huntly, Scotland	16	The event took place at the Huntley town square.
12 September 2015	Unknown	Kirkwall, Scotland	Unknown	
12 September 2015	Fiona Beaton	Dunblane, Scotland	20	
12 September 2015	Kirsty Gentleman	Dunvegan, Scotland	30	
12 September 2015	Ros Ereira, Larissa Moran	London, England	100,000	The march took at 12pm at Park Lane and moved off at 1pm to Parliament Square. Jeremy Corbyn was one of the speakers at the event.
12 September 2015	Cleo Lines, Emma Ball	Canterbury, England	12	
12 September 2015	Sarah Nunn	Chichester, England	Unknown	A candlelit vigil held on Chichester Cathedral's Green in support of the refugees.
12 September 2015	Unknown	Birmingham, England	Unknown	
12 September 2015	Unknown	Truro, England	Unknown	
12 September 2015	Unknown	Brighton, England	Unknown	MP Caroline Lucas was one of the speakers at the event.
12 September 2015	Laney McLeod	Norwich, England	Unknown	
12 September 2015	Micha Streibelt	Berlin, Germany	200	About 200 people joined a rally at Berlin's Potsdamer Platz to welcome refugees.
12 September 2015	Fabien Sammer	Frankfurt, Germany	Unknown	
12 September 2015	Elena Stelmachenko	Cologne, Germany	4	
12 September 2015	Anni Biersack	Munich, Germany	Unknown	
12 September 2015	Sara and Fabiano Rosata	Bologna, Italy	Unknown	
12 September 2015	Unknown	Milan, Italy	Unknown	
12 September 2015	Unknown	Athens, Greece	Unknown	The vigil took place at Syntagma Square.
12 September 2015	Aisha Kaur	Barcelona, Spain	50	
12 September 2015	Bel Casson, Creo Kellab	Rio de Janeiro, Brazil	Unknown	The vigil took place in Quadra Alegria Da Zona Sul in Cantagalo.
12 September 2015	Laureano Ledesma	Maipú, Argentina	4	

== See also ==
- European refugee crisis
- Dungavel
