= McIlvanney =

McIlvanney is a surname. Notable people with the surname include:

- Hugh McIlvanney (1934–2019), Scottish sports journalist
- Liam McIlvanney, Scottish-born crime fiction writer and academic
- William McIlvanney (1936–2015), Scottish novelist, short story writer, and poet
