= Newhailes railway station =

Disused railway station in Musselburgh, East Lothian

Newhailes

General information
- Location: Musselburgh, East Lothian; Scotland
- Coordinates: 55.9379°N 3.0831°W
- Grid reference: NT324721
- Platforms: 2

Other information
- Status: Disused

History
- Original company: North British Railway
- Pre-grouping: North British Railway
- Post-grouping: LNER

Key dates
- 16 May 1859: Opened
- 6 February 1950: Closed
Location

Newhailes railway station, also known as Newhailes Junction, served the town of Musselburgh, East Lothian, Scotland from 1859 to 1950.

== History ==
The station opened in 1859 and closed on 6 February 1950.

Preceding station	Historical railways	Following station
Joppa; Line open, station closed	North British Railway	Musselburgh; Line and station closed
Joppa; Line open, station closed	North British Railway	Inveresk; Line open, station closed
