= The Papers of Tony Veitch =

Crime novel by William McIlvanney

- First edition
- Author: William McIlvanney
- Series: Laidlaw #2
- Publisher: Hodder and Stoughton
- Publication date: 1983
- ISBN: 0340229071
- Preceded by: Laidlaw
- Followed by: Strange Loyalties

The Papers of Tony Veitch is a crime novel by William McIlvanney. This book is the second in the series featuring the character Laidlaw. This series of books is recognised as the foundation of the Tartan Noir genre.

== Plot ==
Jack Laidlaw visits the deathbed of an alcoholic vagrant, Eck Adamson, who provides a cryptic last message which helps solve the murder of a gangland thug and the disappearance of a student. In the process, Laidlaw uncovers widespread corruption.

Eck Adamson appears in the last Laidlaw novel about Laidlaw’s early career: The Dark Remains. He is an informer for Jack Laidlaw, who says "I know the streets, but Eck here has a doctorate and any number of diplomas." He is described as "anything between thirty and sixty and probably had no more than a decade left in him without a radical change of lifestyle," as he knocks back two large rums with a pint of Guinness in between.

== Editions ==
The book was first published in 1983 by Hodder & Staughton, and was reissued on 3 June 2013 by Canongate Books.
