= The Longships in Harbour =

Poetry collection by William McIlvanney

First edition (publ. Eyre & Spottiswoode)

The Longships in Harbour is a collection of poetry by Scottish author William McIlvanney. It was first published in 1970.

The poems in this collection deal largely with the poet's experiences of growing up in a working class area of Scotland, particularly his family life. The most famous and striking poem in the collection is "Initiation", a raw, intense poem in memory of his father.

Other themes dealt with throughout are poverty, famine, war, youth and innocence, and the passage of time.
