= Walking wounded (disambiguation) =

Walking wounded is a medical classification for persons who are not so badly injured that they cannot walk.

Walking wounded may also refer to:

- Walking Wounded (short story), a 1944 short story by Irwin Shaw
- Walking Wounded (short story collection), a 1989 collection of short stories by William McIlvanney
- Walking Wounded, a 1996 album by Everything but the Girl
  - "Walking Wounded" (Everything but the Girl song)
- "Walking Wounded" (The Tea Party song), 2000
- "Walking Wounded", an unreleased song from the 2004 album A Slice of Fried Gold by Page 44
- The Walking Wounded, a 2007 album by Bayside
