= Strange Loyalties =

1991 novel by William McIlvanney

- First edition
- Author: William McIlvanney
- Series: Laidlaw #3
- Publisher: Hodder & Stoughton
- Publication date: 1991
- Pages: 281
- ISBN: 9780340533789
- Preceded by: The Papers of Tony Veitch
- Followed by: The Dark Remains

Strange Loyalties is a 1991 crime novel by William McIlvanney. This book is the third in the series featuring the character Laidlaw. This series of books is recognised as the foundation of the Tartan Noir genre.

== Plot ==
The novel centres around the death of Jack Laidlaw's brother Scott (a teacher) who is run over by a car. Laidlaw is faced with an emotional journey to the depths of Glasgow's underworld and his own past, to discover the truth, finds out as much about himself as his brother.

== Style ==
Unlike the first two novels in this series, Strange Loyalties is written as a first-person narrative.

== Editions ==
The book was first published in 1991 by Hodder & Stoughton, and was reissued on 3 June 2013 by Canongate.
