= Malcolm Mackay =

Malcolm Mackay may refer to:

- Malcolm Mackay (Australian politician) (1919–1998), Australian clergyman and politician
- Malcolm MacKay (Canadian politician) (1944–2025), Canadian politician
- Malcolm Mackay (writer) (born 1981), Scottish writer

== See also ==
- Malcolm McKay (disambiguation)
