= The Big Man (novel) =

1985 novel by William McIlvanney

- First UK edition
- Author: William McIlvanney
- Publisher: Hodder & Stoughton (UK), William Morrow & Co (US)
- Publication date: 1985 (UK), 1 May 1986 (US)
- Pages: 256
- ISBN: 978-0688064051

The Big Man is a novel by William McIlvanney published in 1986 based on real life miner and bare knuckle boxer Thomas Tallen and Alex Ritchie, a close friend of McIlvanney. The book was adapted into a film directed by David Leland, The Big Man (1990), which stars Liam Neeson, Billy Connolly, and Hugh Grant.

== Plot ==
This novel relates the story of Dan Scoular, an unemployed man who turns to bare-knuckle boxing to make a living.
