= Malcolm McKay =

Malcolm McKay may refer to:

- Malcolm McKay (writer) (born 1947), British writer
- Malcolm McKay (politician) (1873–1928), Canadian politician

== See also ==
- Malcolm Mackay (disambiguation)
