= The Dark Remains =

2021 Scottish crime novel

- First edition
- Author: William McIlvanney & Ian Rankin
- Series: Laidlaw #4
- Publisher: Canongate
- Publication date: 2021
- Pages: 182
- ISBN: 9781838854102
- Preceded by: Strange Loyalties

The Dark Remains is a Scottish crime novel of the tartan noir genre set in Glasgow. Part-written by William McIlvanney who left a half-finished handwritten draft when he died in 2015, the novel was completed by Ian Rankin and published in 2021.

== Background ==
The Dark Remains was based on a half-written manuscript and notes left by McIllvanney after his death in 2015. In an interview with The Glasgow Herald, Rankin speaks of taking responsibility for bringing the book to completion. He says:

Reading the Laidlaw books, it’s a world of men sitting in smoke-filled bars psyching each other out, trying to play mind games with each other. And if the mind games fail, it turns to physical violence.

He also speaks of making "necessary tweaks" to the portrayal of Glasgow and giving more importance to women characters.

== Plot ==
Jack Laidlaw has been moved to the Central Division of the Glasgow Crime Squad. He is still a DC (detective constable) and is working for DI Ernie Milligan, who was a DC with Laidlaw (Milligan joined the Masons). Robert Frederick, the commander of the Glasgow Crime Squad, assigns DS Bob Lilley to keep an eye on him, saying Laidlaw's "reputation has always preceded him... Who has he rubbed up the wrong way this month? .... he’s good at the job, and seems to have a sixth sense for what's happening on the streets, (but) he needs careful handling if we’re to get the best out of him".

The novel is set in October 1972, early in Laidlaw's career. Bobby Carter, the right-hand man and lawyer cum money launderer for Cam Colvin, one of Glasgow's top gangsters, has disappeared, and then his body is found – in Rhode's territory. John Rhodes is Colvin's main rival, not minor gangsters like Matt Mason and Malky Chisholm. Milligan pontificates to his team that the graffiti tells him that "the Cumbries are encroaching on the Carlton turf." A stabbing is one hell of a calling card, wouldn’t you agree?" He assumes (like other gangsters) that a rival gangster arranged Carter's death, and gang warfare intensifies. However, Laidlaw sees in Carter's home evidence of recent painting to cover up bloodstains from a domestic dispute after the abusive Carter was stabbed by his wife and children. His wife eventually confesses (but only to Laidlaw), to keep the children out of it. Laidlaw bypasses Milligan, whom he despises, by reporting directly to Commander Frederick. When the team (apart from Milligan!) is celebrating the end of the case (at the Top Spot bar, Hope Street), Frederick says privately to Lilley that "if he doesn’t manage to detonate himself in the near future, he might be in line for a swift promotion... (although he is) not exactly a team player."

== Jack Laidlaw ==
Laidlaw is in his late thirties. He was a "handsome enough man, physically big at six-feet plus, broad-shouldered, and square-jawed". He suffers from migraines. He resembles Rankin's policeman John Rebus as a maverick.

He joined the police after a year at university. He was interested in literature and philosophy, although his working-class parents expected him to get a "meal ticket" as a doctor or dentist (like his brother Scott, a teacher). He has books by Unamuno, Kierkegaarde and Camus on his desk. He worked on the "Bible John" case three years ago.

Laidlaw lives in Simshill. He is married to Ena and they have three young children, Moya, Sandra and Jack aged 6, 5 and 2. He stays in town at the Burleigh Hotel when on a case. He uses the hotel to take messages from his informers like Eck Adamson (and sleeps with Jan the receptionist).

== Influence of McIlvanney's Laidlaw novels ==
The three Laidlaw novels (published in 1977, 1983 and 1991) have been called the first crime novels in the tartan noir genre. He is regarded as "the father of tartan noir and as Scotland's Camus.

Several authors emphasize the importance of these novels:

- "Fastest, first, and best, Laidlaw is the melancholy heir to Marlow. Reads like a breathless scalpel cut through the bloody heart of a city." (Denise Mina)
- "The Laidlaw books are not just great crime novels, they are important ones." (Mark Billingham)
- "It's hard to comprehend how radically different William McIllvanney's novels were from anything that preceded them." (Val McDermid)
- "The Laidlaw books are like fine malt whisky - the pure distilled essence of Scottish crime writing." (Peter May)

Rankin himself said, "It's doubtful I would be a crime writer without the influence of McIlvanney's Laidlaw."

The Dark Remains is said to be Laidlaw’s first case, but this is not true (although The Dark Remains is set before the first three Laidlaw novels). Kirkus Reviews called it "as deeply satisfying as the final lines of a prayer."

== Reception ==
The novel was released with much press attention and speculation as to which parts were Rankin's and which McIllvanney's. The Scotsman called it "both enjoyable and thought-provoking." The Washington Post called it "darkly beautiful", and Kirkus Reviews called it; "as deeply satisfying as the final lines of a prayer."
