= Alex Gray (author) =

Scottish writer

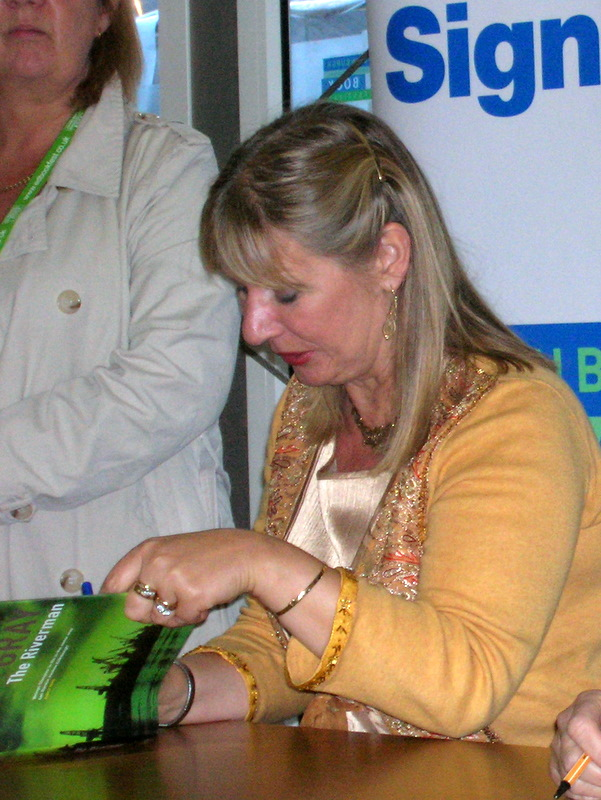
- Alex Gray (2007)
- Born: Sandra Gray Lang; 27 May 1950 (age 76); Glasgow
- Occupation: Author
- Writing career
- Pen name: Alex Gray
- Genre: Crime fiction
- Website: www.alexgrayauthor.co.uk

Alex Gray (born 27 May 1950) is a Scottish crime writer. She has published 19 novels, all set around Glasgow and featuring the character of Detective Chief Inspector Lorimer and his psychological profiler Solomon Brightman, the earlier novels being published by Canongate and Allison & Busby and later books by Little Brown. She has also published magazine articles, poetry and short stories as well as stories for BBC radio schools programmes.

== Biography ==
Alex Gray (born Sandra Gray Lang) was brought up in the Craigbank area of Glasgow and attended Hutchesons' Grammar School. Her father was a telecommunications engineer and her mother, originally from Tobermory on the Isle of Mull, was a telephone exchange operator. She studied English and Philosophy at Strathclyde University and was a founding member of Battlefield Band. She worked for a period in the Department of Health & Social Security, before training as an English teacher. In 1976, she lived in Rhodesia for three months, during which time she married. Thereafter, she continued teaching in Scotland until the 1990s, when she began to write full-time. Gray is a member of the Femmes Fatales crime writing trio, together with Alanna Knight and Lin Anderson. She is the co-founder with Anderson of Bloody Scotland, Scotland's first international crime writing festival, which takes place in Stirling. Gray has two children and two grandchildren; she lives with her husband in Renfrewshire.

Gray has published 21 novels in the Lorimer series.

=== Awards ===
In November 2024, Gray was awarded an Honorary Doctorate from the University of the West of Scotland.

== Bibliography ==
- Never Somewhere Else (2002)
- A Small Weeping (2004)
- Shadows of Sounds (2005)
- The Riverman (2007)
- Pitch Black (2008)
- Glasgow Kiss (2009)
- Five Ways To Kill A Man (2010)
- Sleep like the Dead (2011)
- A Pound of Flesh (2012)
- The Swedish Girl (2013)
- The Bird That Did Not Sing (2014)
- Keep The Midnight Out (2015)
- The Darkest Goodbye (2016)
- Still Dark (2017)
- Only the Dead Can Tell (2018)
- The Stalker (2019)
- When Shadows Fall (2020)
- Before the Storm (2021)
- Echo of the Dead (2022)
- Questions for a Dead Man (2023)
- Out of Darkness (2024)
