= Remedy is None =

1966 novel by William McIlvanney

- First edition (publ. Eyre and Spottiswoode)
- Author: William McIlvanney
- Language: English
- Publisher: Eyre and Spottiswoode
- Publication date: 1966
- LC Class: PZ4.M1498 Re

Remedy is None is the debut novel by the Scottish writer William McIlvanney, first published in 1966, and republished in 2014.

The novel won the Geoffrey Faber Memorial Prize in 1967.
