= Lin Anderson =

British crime novelist and screenwriter

Lin (Linda) Anderson
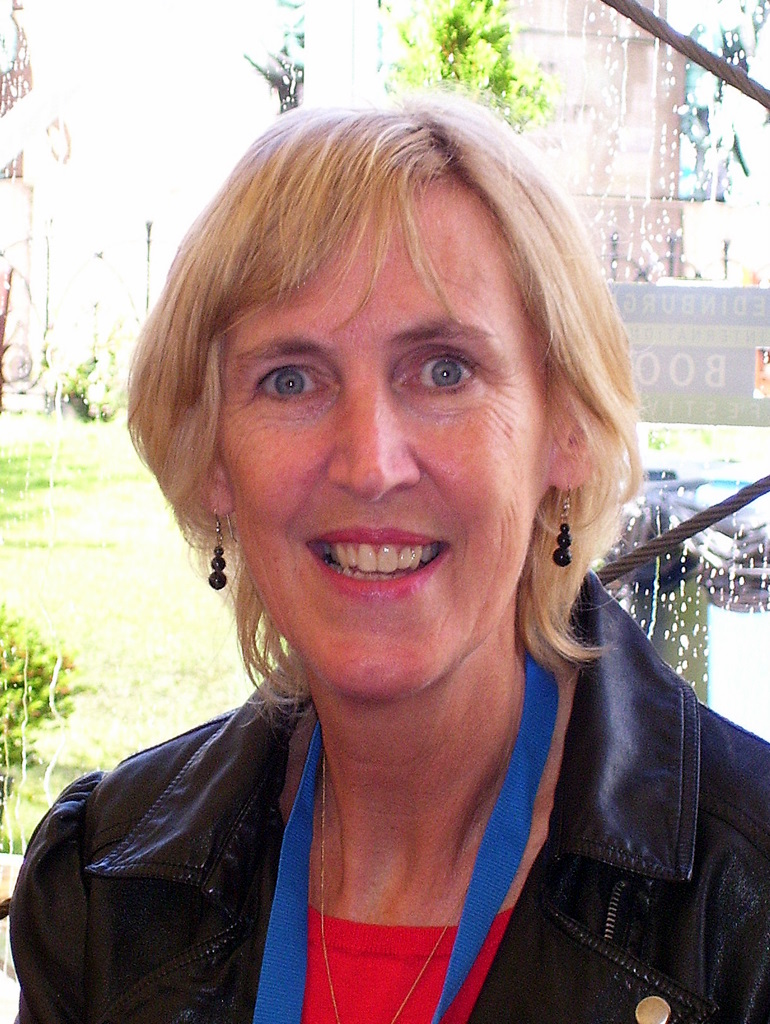
- Born: Greenock, Scotland
- Writing career
- Genres: Tartan Noir, crime fiction

Lin (Linda) Anderson (born in Greenock, Scotland) is a Tartan Noir crime novelist and screenwriter, best known as the creator of forensic scientist Rhona MacLeod. As of 2010, the Rhona MacLeod books were being developed for ITV.

== Life and career ==
Anderson was born in Greenock, of Scottish and Irish parents. Her father was a detective in the CID. She worked in the Nigerian bush for five years during the 1980s, and later wrote an African short story which was broadcast on BBC Radio Four. Another of her African stories was published in the 10th Anniversary Macallan/Scotland on Sunday Short Story Collection. Before turning full-time to writing, she used to teach maths and computing at George Watson's College, Edinburgh.

A film of her screenplay Small Love was shown at London Film Festival and Edinburgh International Film Festival in 2001, and broadcast on Scottish Television in 2001 and 2002. Since then she has graduated from the newly founded Screen Academy Scotland, and has further screenplays in production.

Lin is a massive fan of the film Braveheart, claiming to have seen it over fifty times, and in 2004 wrote a book about the making of it (see Non-fiction below).

Lin is a member of the Femmes Fatales crime writing trio, together with Alanna Knight and Alex Gray.

She and Alex Gray are amongst the co-founders of Bloody Scotland, a Tartan Noir and Scottish crime writer's festival, which has been held in Stirling since 2012.

In August 2025, Anderson was a guest on the Off the Shelf Podcast as part of a feature on the McIlvanney Prize.

== Bibliography ==
=== Rhona MacLeod series ===
- Driftnet (2003)
- Torch (2004)
- Deadly Code (2005)
- Blood Red Roses (2005)
- Dark Flight (2007)
- Easy Kill (2008)
- Final Cut (2009)
- The Reborn (2010)
- Picture Her Dead (2011)
- Paths of the Dead (2014)
- The Special Dead (2015)
- None But the Dead (2016)
- Follow the Dead (2017)
- Sins of the Dead (2018)
- Time for the Dead (2019)
- The Innocent Dead (2020)
- The Killing Tide (2021)
- The Wild Coast (2023)
- Whispers of the Dead (2024)
- The Dead and the Dying (2025)

=== Patrick de Courvoisier series ===
- The Case of the Black Pearl (2014)
- The Case of the Missing Madonna (2015)
- Ice Cold in Cannes (2024)

=== Blaze Dog Detective series (with Donald McKay) ===
- The Magic Flag Mystery (2020)
- The Dinosaur Mystery (2021)

=== Standalone novels ===
- The Party House (2022)

=== Screenplays ===
- Small Love (2001)
- River Child (2006)
- The Incredible Lightness of Brian (2006)

=== Non-fiction ===
- Braveheart: From Hollywood to Holyrood (2004)
