= Kate Foster (Scottish writer) =

Scottish writer (born 1974/5)

Kate Foster (born 1974 or 1975) is a Scottish writer of historical fiction, who was formerly a journalist for 25 years. She is known for her novels The Maiden (2023), The King's Witches (2024), and The Mourning Necklace (2025).

== Early life and education ==
Kate Foster was born in 1974 or 1975, and grew up in Corstorphine, Scotland.

== Career ==
Foster was a journalist for a national newspaper for 25 years before publishing her first novel at the age of 48.

Foster won the Bloody Scotland Pitch Perfect award for aspiring writers in 2020.

Her first novel, The Maiden, won her the 2023 Scottish Crime Debut of the Year and was longlisted for the 2024 Women's Prize for Fiction. Foster describes it as "a feminist retelling of a 17th century Edinburgh murder", and it concerns the murder of Lord James Forrester by Lady Christian Nimmo in Corstorphine in 1679.

Her second novel, The King's Witches, was included by The Herald in "the 10 best new historical fictions" in May 2024. It is set in the context of Anne of Denmark's betrothal to James VI and the North Berwick witch trials of 1590.

In January 2024 the publisher Mantle signed a deal for The King's Witches and Foster's next two novels, to be published in 2025 and 2026. It was reported that the 2025 title was to be The Reawakening, but Foster said in June 2024 that it will be The Mourning Necklace. It tells the story of Maggie Dickson, known as "hauf-hingit Maggie", who survived a botched execution by hanging in 1724.

== Personal life ==
As of 2024 Foster was living in Edinburgh with her two children.

She has said that she enjoys reading crime, historical and modern fiction, singling out Sarah Perry, Hannah Kent, Sarah Waters, and City of Vengeance by D. V. Bishop.

== Selected publications ==
- Foster, Kate (2023). The Maiden. London: Mantle. ISBN 9781529091724.
- Foster, Kate (20 June 2024). The King's Witches. London: Mantle. ISBN 9781529091786.
- The Mourning Necklace (2025; previously announced as The Reawakening)
