= Francine Toon =

British novelist and poet (born 1986)

Francine Toon (born 1986, also writing as Francine Elena), is a British novelist and poet.

== Early life ==
Toon was born in Canterbury, England, in 1986. Her family lived in England and Portugal before moving to the Scottish Highlands, near Dornoch when she was aged nine. Two years later they moved to St Andrews, Fife where Toon attended Madras College. She "returned regularly for holidays" to Sutherland "until she was into her late teens" and "the northern wilds have haunted her ever since, and form the backdrop to her debut novel". She attended Edinburgh University, where she wrote for The Student, before interning at Chambers Dictionaries. After university she moved to London to work in publishing. She was a commissioning editor at Sceptre, an imprint of Hachette, and then became an editor for The Novelry, a provider of online writing courses.

== Writing ==
Her debut novel, Pine, won the 2020 McIlvanney Prize for "the best Scottish crime book of the year", and was shortlisted for the 2020 Bloody Scotland Debut Prize and longlisted for the Highland Book Prize and the Deborah Rogers Foundation Writers Award. The Guardian's reviewer said that it "inhabits the woods and fells like a secretive wild animal" and called it a "well-written tale" but said that "What lets the narrative down is its reliance on the conventional tropes of the ghost-story genre." The Scotsman's reviewer found that "There’s much to admire in Pine" but that "There are, however, one or two issues with the predictability of the plot that detract from the whole." while saying that the book is "carefully calibrated to make every single hair on the back of your neck stand up on end as if you'd just heard a twig snap behind you in a forest at midnight." It was included in The Telegraph's "Best first novels to look out for in 2020".

Her second novel, Bluff, was published in 2025. Its publisher describes it as a "dual-timeline literary thriller with dark academic undertones", set in Fife in the fictional town of St Rule and "drawing inspiration from the ancient university town of St Andrews".

Her poetry, written under the name Francine Elena, has appeared in publications including The Best British Poetry 2013, The Best British Poetry 2015, The Sunday Times, Poetry London, Ambit, The Honest Ulsterman, The Quietus, and Wasafiri.
