= Laidlaw (novel) =

1977 novel by William McIlvanney

- First edition
- Author: William McIlvanney
- Language: English
- Series: Laidlaw #1
- Genre: Crime fiction
- Publisher: Hodder and Stoughton
- Publication date: 1977
- Publication place: Scotland
- Media type: Print (hardcover)
- Pages: 224
- ISBN: 0340207272
- OCLC: 3108663
- Dewey Decimal: 823/.9/14
- LC Class: PZ4.M1498 Lai PR6063.A237
- Followed by: The Papers of Tony Veitch

Laidlaw is the first novel of a series of crime books by William McIlvanney, first published in 1977. It features the eponymous detective in his attempts to find the brutal sex-related murderer of a Glasgow teenager. Laidlaw is marked by his unconventional methods in tracking the killer, immersing himself in a 1970s Glasgow featuring violence and bigotry.

When Laidlaw was released in 1977, McIlvanney was known for having recently won the Whitbread Prize with his historical family novel, Docherty; as a complete departure from that genre, it surprised many of his readers.

== Tartan Noir ==
This novel is considered the first 'Tartan Noir' and is cited as being inspiration for the Rebus novels by Ian Rankin. Alan Massie wrote that "Hemingway used to say that all American literature came out of Huckleberry Finn; all Scottish crime writing — ‘tartan noir’ — comes out of Laidlaw."

In Val McDermid's crime novel "1979" her lead character, Allie Burns, reads the novel in a single session, attracted by the quality of the prose and the realism of the descriptions.
