= Majella Cullinane =

Irish-New Zealand author (1975–2026)

- Born: 23 October 1975; Limerick, Ireland
- Died: 29 September 2026 (aged 50); Dunedin, New Zealand
- Education: University of St Andrews, Otago University

Majella Mary Cullinane (23 October 1975 – 29 September 2026) was an Irish-born author based in New Zealand.

== Life and career ==
Born and raised in Ireland, Cullinane became a New Zealand resident in 2008. She earned a MLitt. in Creative Writing from the University of St Andrews, Scotland, and completed a PhD in Creative Practice at the Centre for Irish and Scottish Studies at the University of Otago. Her doctoral advisors were Vincent O'Sullivan and Liam McIlvanney. She lived in Port Chalmers, New Zealand.

Cullinane drew inspiration for her work from myths and history, with her poems exploring nature and dreams, real and imagined people. Her collection Guarding the Flame takes its title from the myth surrounding Saint Bridgid’s flame in Kildare.

Cullinane died on 29 September 2026, at the age of 50.

== Works ==
- Guarding the Flame (Salmon Poetry, 2011), collection of poetry
- The Life of De'Ath (Steele Roberts Aotearoa, 2018), novel
- Whisper of a Crow's Wing (Salmon Poetry and Otago University Press, 2018)
- Meantime (Otago University Press, 2024)
- Islands Ever After (Quentin Wilson, 2026)

== Awards ==
Her first novel, The Life of De'Ath, was shortlisted for the 2016 Dundee International Book Prize. and longlisted for the 2019 Ockham New Zealand Book Awards.

In 2014 she was awarded the Robert Burns Fellowship, a literary residency at the University of Otago in Dunedin, New Zealand.

Cullinane also received a Seán Dunne Young Writers' Award for Poetry, an Irish Arts Council Award and the Hennessy XO/Irish Times Literary Award for Emerging Poetry.
