= Maggie Dickson =

Scottish 18th-century hanging survivor

Margaret Dickson
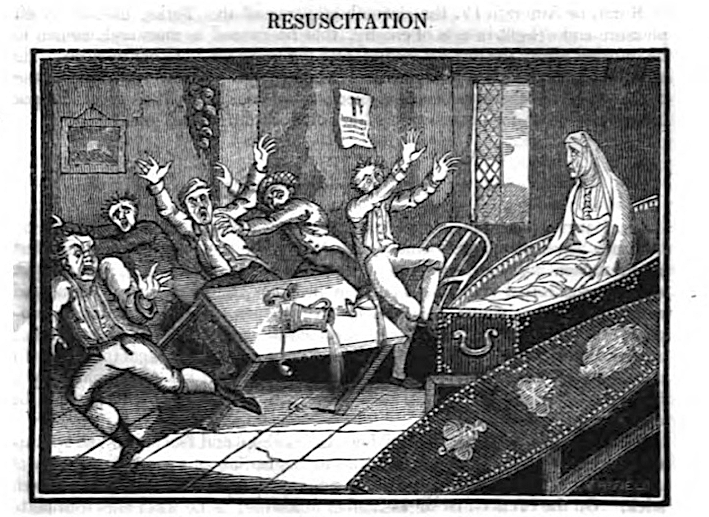
- An 1825 dramatised depiction of Dickson
- Born: Inveresk, Scotland
- Other name: Maggie
- Occupation: Salt maker

Margaret Dickson, better known as Maggie and nicknamed Half-Hanged or Half-Hangit Maggie, was a Scottish salt maker from Musselburgh who was found guilty for the concealment of her pregnancy and subsequent murder of her newborn and likely illegitimate child, though this child may have instead been stillborn. Dickson survived being hanged in the Grassmarket of Edinburgh in 1724, and sat up in her coffin at the village of Peffer Mill while being transported to her grave in Inveresk. Under Scottish law, her sentence had already been carried out, and so she was not re-hanged. She had technically legally died and so had to re-marry her husband, then lived for at least four decades after her hanging. The hanging sparked public discontent with the treatment of infanticidal mothers in Scotland, and may have been a cause of violent protest in opposition to grave robbery and body snatching in 1725.

== Early life and career ==
The parents of Margaret Dickson are unknown, though she was born in Inveresk, near Musselburgh. She had a brother James, a weaver. Living as an adult in Musselburgh, six miles away from Edinburgh, she was part of Musselburgh's industry in salt-making. She lived with her husband Mr Dickson, a fisherman, and they had a number of children before impressment forced him into the Royal Navy.

== Concealment of pregnancy and death of child ==
After her husband left, according to contemporary publications and pamphlets, Dickson underwent a sexual extra-marital affair with another local man and became pregnant. The identity of the child's father is unknown. Scottish law dictated that unchaste women would be punished by being rebuked by a church minister on three Sundays in a row, while seated in a specific area of the church. Fearing the humiliation of this potential outcome, she hid that she was pregnant.

The child died, though whether she experienced stillbirth or not is unknown. Dickson would later state that she retained the corpse of her newborn infant in her bed for well over a week, then put it into the nearby river; David Nash and Anne-Marie Kilday argued in 2010 that this could suggest Dickson either during or after the birth "was suffering from some form of mental malaise".

== Investigation and trial ==
On 19 December 1723, the body of a male newborn infant was found having washed up on the bank of the River Tweed, nearby Kelso, Scottish Borders. No clear marks of violence against the child were found, though it was standard procedure for authorities to commission a search of the nearby area for women who showed symptoms of having recently given birth, conducting physical examinations of several women. They found that Dickson had postpartum symptoms including 'ripe' breast milk. She confessed under further investigation to the justices of the peace for Roxburgh that she was the mother of the dead child, though maintained that the child was stillborn.

In summer 1724, at the High Court of Justiciary in Edinburgh, Dickson was tried for parricide as well as the murder of her own child. That Dickson may have been suffering from mental illness was not considered by the court. Four people were called by the prosecution; a surgeon, a midwife and two women local to the crime. While their testimony largely only substantiated Dickson's confession, one Margaret Lenman said that Dickson had refused to confess when she was arrested on suspicion of murdering the child, and had only confessed to the Roxburgh justices of the peace after local minister Mr Ramsay had either "persuaded" or "shamed" her into doing so. Defences presented by Dickson's legal team included this idea that her confession had been coerced, as well as the propositions that searches conducted by the authorities had not been thorough enough, that Dickson was still suckling her youngest child and so her postpartum symptoms were a false positive, and that the 1690 statute applied only to single women whereas Dickson was married. Nash and Kilday have put forward that comparatively, the incriminating evidence for the crime was lacking, causing Dickson's defence to become overconfident.

Dickson's admission that she had concealed her pregnancy and not asked for help with the birth meant that the court was able to successfully apply a Scottish infanticide statute from 1690 to the case, despite her status as a married woman making multiple elements of the act inapplicable to the case. Thus, on 3 August 1724, Dickson was found unanimously guilty under this 1690 act, a version of the Puritan Act in England which had attempted to prevent the destruction and murder of bastard children. The judge described her "horrid and barbarous occult crime", which he said was committed by "an unnatural woman", and then sentenced her for public hanging in Edinburgh's Grassmarket, a public square near Edinburgh Castle, in 1728, She pleaded innocent and continued to do so until her death.

== Hanging ==
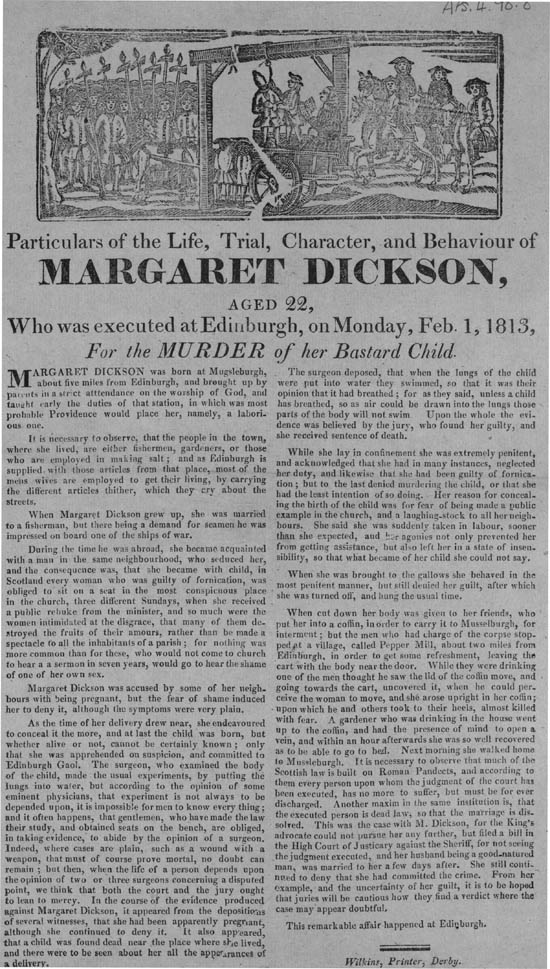
A broadside ballad from Wilkins printers in Derby; "Particulars of the Life, Trial, Character, and Behaviour of Margaret Dickson."

Dickson's gallows speech as recorded in pamphlets was somewhat lengthy, and usual for this form of pamphlet, though it is unclear whether she in fact wrote it.

The scaffold on which Dickson was hanged had three posts which were ten and twelve feet tall and which were connected by three crossbeams at the top. Standing on a cart, her feet were bound and she was masked before the rope was attached to her neck and the gibbet. A signal from the dropping of a handkerchief would have caused the horses attached to the cart to be whipped, and they would have darted forward to pull the cart out from under her. According to one account in an unnamed pamphlet printed days after the attempted execution, Dickson was hanged for what was considered a usual amount of time. The executioner pulled down on her legs during this to speed up her death, as was said to be common. At the foot of the gibbet, with Dickson believed dead, she was placed in a coffin whose lid was nailed down.

=== Transport and recovery ===
By her family's wishes, the coffin began a journey to the churchyard of her birthplace in Inveresk. At this point, a scuffle began; the unnamed pamphlet recounts that "there happened a scuffle between her friends and surgeons-apprentices" for control of the coffin, the latter likely trying to obtain the body for dissection. It was stated that the coffin was damaged in the affray; "One, with a hammer, broke down one of the sides [...] of the chest [coffin]; which, having given some air, and, together with the jolting of the case, set the blood and vitals agoing." It was purported that this had been what had resuscitated Dickson.

Around two miles into the journey to Inveresk, at the village of Peffer Mill, two joiners who were passing by heard noises coming from the coffin while the people transporting the body were drinking beer. This prompted the removal of the lid, after which Dickson sat up in the coffin. She complained that she had a dry mouth and sore neck. Peter Purdie, a phlebotomist, let blood from Dickson, and under command from the local magistrate she was then driven to Musselburgh, regaining some strength overnight.

The next day, Dickson was visited by minister Robert Bonally, and was then taken to the house of her brother James, a weaver. The unnamed pamphlet purported that she remained delirious for two days and wrote that she cried out that she would be executed the next Wednesday, though after this only complained that her neck was painful. The next Sunday, she went to church where many people came to see her. A different unnamed account purports that the next Wednesday, a week after her hanging, she spent the day engaging in fasting and prayer, vowing to do so each Wednesday for the remainder of her life.

== Life post-recovery ==
Under Scottish law, Dickson's sentence had already been carried out; she had legally died, and so she was not re-hanged and was at liberty. This would not have been the case under English law. Dickson did remarry her former husband a few days later in a public ceremony, as her marriage had dissolved due to the incorrect declaration of her death.

Dickson continued living for at least four more decades, with the Newgate Calendar reporting that she was still alive in 1753 and selling salt in Edinburgh. She was nicknamed "Half-Hangit", or half-hanged, Maggie Dickson. Her death date is unknown.

== Responses ==
Many press reports and other publications wrote of Dickson's recovery; Nash and Kilday have noted that "in effect, she became an early modern celebrity", and gained "cult-heroine status" in central Scotland. Popular discontent with the treatment of infanticidal mothers became more audible after Dickson's hanging, to the point at which the Scottish authorities stepped in to quash it by encouraging printed recantations, carrying out a detailed investigation of the execution, issuing a directive that the hangman responsible for a failed execution would be executed in the criminal's place, and published two more confessions on Dickson's behalf in a populist, poetic style; A Warning to the Wicked, or, Margaret Dickson's Welcome to the Gibbet (1724) and Margaret Dickson's Penetential Confession (1728 or later). Both portrayed Dickson as impenitent and sinful. The Newgate Calendar purported that because the judgement was carried out improperly, the King's advocate "filed a bill in the High Court of Justiciary against the Sheriff".

Robert Baker has put forward that Dickson's hanging was likely the main incident that led to violent protest in opposition to grave robbery and body snatching in 1725, as it highlighted that medical students had to publicly engage in bodysnatching to acquire bodies for the then-legal though unpopular practice of dissection.

== Legacy ==
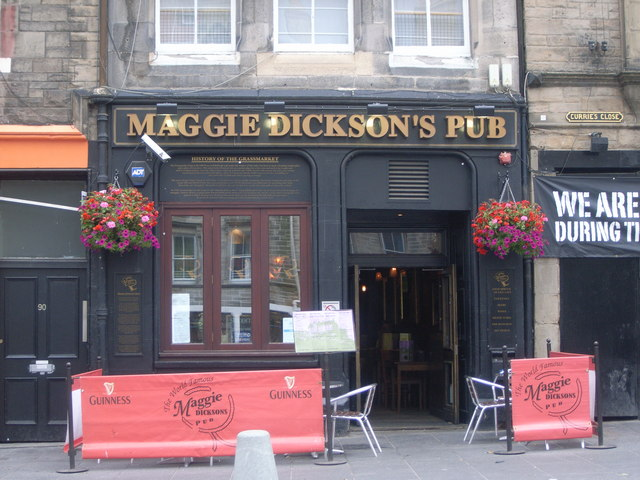
Maggie Dickson's Pub in the Grassmarket, Edinburgh

An Edinburgh pub in the Grassmarket is named after Dickson; the anniversary of Dickson's alleged resurrection is commemorated through the distribution of free beer.

The 2025 fiction book The Mourning Necklace by Kate Foster is based on Dickson's life.
