= The Big Man =

1990 film by David Leland

- Promotional release poster
- Directed by: David Leland
- Written by: Don Macpherson
- Produced by: Stephen Woolley
- Starring: Liam Neeson; Joanne Whalley-Kilmer; Ian Bannen; Billy Connolly
- Music by: Ennio Morricone
- Distributed by: Mayfair
- Release date: 31 August 1990
- Running time: 93 minutes
- Country: United Kingdom
- Language: English
- Box office: £268,000 (UK)

The Big Man (US title: Crossing the Line) is a 1990 British sports drama film directed by David Leland. It stars Liam Neeson, Joanne Whalley and Billy Connolly. The film's score was composed by Ennio Morricone. It is based on the 1986 novel of the same name by William McIlvanney.

Set in a once prosperous mining community, now a ghost town, an unemployed miner who was imprisoned for his part in the miner's strike is released from jail, and in order to make some money agrees to take part in a boxing fight. However, he discovers the real implications of the fight, and finds himself caught up with the Glaswegian gangland society.

== Plot ==
In the mid-1980s, Danny Scoular marries Beth. Several years later, the couple have two children and Danny is a striking miner, who is sentenced to six months in prison for assaulting a police officer during a protest. Upon his release, the mine in his Scottish village has closed and he is banned from mining regardless, having to rely on Beth to bring in a wage in order to support the family.

Whilst visiting the local pub, Danny meets his old friend Frankie. Frankie has deliberately visited the pub with Mr. Mason, who is implied to be involved in organised crime, in an attempt to show off Danny's ability to fight. Mason orders his foot soldier Billy to purposely start a fight with Danny to test his fighting skills. Danny wins the fight. He returns home to Beth, having been paid a large sum of money by Mason to engage in a bare-knuckle fight in several weeks' time. Beth is uneasy about this and fears for Danny's safety.

Danny begins training with Frankie. Whilst out training, Danny sees that Beth has taken their children on a bus out of the village to stay in Glasgow with her parents. In an attempt to get Beth back, Danny goes for a job interview to prove he can hold down a steady job, but after exchanging insults with the manager; Danny returns to training for the fight. As he is to leave the village for Glasgow, most of the village residents gather the streets to see him off and wish him luck.

Arriving in Glasgow, Danny brings his dog along and stays in a hotel with Frankie, beginning training the next day. Danny states that he will fight with honour and not lower himself by training to fight dirty. His trainer tells him his opponent will fight dirty and that Danny will inevitably have to fight dirty too in order to survive. Danny instructs Frankie to take his dog back to Beth and say hello to his children for him, but whilst doing so Frankie sees Beth going out with another man, Gordon. Unable to leave the dog with Beth, Frankie throws the dog in the river and lies to Danny about the incident. That night the dog finds his way back to Danny. Furious at Frankie, Danny leaves the hotel.

Whilst visiting a club, Danny sees Beth with Gordon. Distraught and angry, he leaves the club, pursued by an equally angry Frankie. Whilst arguing, Danny tells Frankie the fight is off. That night, Beth and Gordon have sex.

The next morning, Mason and Frankie wait for Danny to turn up to the gym, unsure whether he will. When Danny does appear, he challenges everyone in the gym to a fight, and after a partner is found, Danny is punched to the floor. In an attempt to motivate him, Danny is taken to Mason's childhood neighbourhood and introduced to the children playing in the rubble who have become drug addicts. Mason reveals that Danny's opponent in the bare-knuckle fight will be fighting on behalf of Cam Colvin, a drug trafficker, and that if Danny wins the fight it will put Colvin out of business.

Danny is taken to the fight, which takes place in an abandoned ship-yard. Danny's opponent is a man called Cutty Dawson, who is blind in one eye. The rules are made clear - the last man standing wins. The pair engage in a long and brutal slog, with Dawson engaging in dirty tactics. Unable to keep up with Dawson, Danny is forced to listen to his trainer and fight dirty, targeting Dawson's eyes before smashing his head numerous times on the concrete floor and kicking him in the face. Danny is declared the winner.

Whilst at Mason's home recuperating, he is offered cocaine by Mason's daughter. Dawson's brother arrives and attempts to enter the house but is prevented. Dawson's brother reveals that Danny has now completely blinded Dawson in the fight and tells Danny where to find him. Danny confronts Mason for his money. Mason opens a safe to reveal a huge quantity of money inside. After Danny asks what Dawson will get money-wise, Mason begins to taunt Danny and throw money at him which leads Danny to lose his temper and knock Mason out. Danny decides to take all of the money in the safe.

Danny forces Frankie to drive him to the hospital where Dawson is staying. Frankie tells him that unless he gives the money back immediately both of them will be murdered. At Dawson's hospital bedside, Danny asks what the purpose of the fight was. Dawson reveals that Mason and Colvin were in drug trafficking together and both had a grievance against a drug dealer living in Spain, but, due to the importance of this particular dealer, neither wanted to be the one responsible for his death due to potential reprimands. As such, it was decided that a bare-knuckle fight would take place, with the loser having to complete the assassination and be responsible for any potential criminal underworld reprimands or punishments.

Danny makes his way back to his village to discover Beth and his children have returned but Beth will not allow Danny or his 'blood-money' in the house. Danny, with nowhere else to go, visits his former coal mine. He spots Frankie nearby, who has been slashed across his face as punishment, and who has led Mason and his foot soldiers to the location. Danny hands the money back to Mason, who reveals that he has already visited Danny's wife and children.

Danny races back to his house to find it now empty. On the street, Danny weeps on his knees as Mason drives up. As Mason approaches Danny, Beth, her children and most of the village crowd the street, standing in solidarity with Danny. As Mason makes threats to Danny, Beth repeats them for all of the village to hear. Knowing that any subsequent retaliations against Danny could implicate him, Mason and his foot-soldiers leave. The village crowd around the Scoular family as they embrace and are reunited.

== Cast ==
- Liam Neeson as Danny Scoular
- Joanne Whalley-Kilmer as Beth Scoular
- Billy Connolly as Frankie
- Ian Bannen as Matt Mason
- Juliet Cadzow as Margaret Mason
- Tom Watson as Tommy Brogan
- Hugh Grant as Gordon
- Kenny Ireland as Tony
- George Rossi as Eddie
- Julie Graham as Melanie
- Johnny Beattie as Beth's father
- Amanda Walker as Beth's mother
- Peter Mullan as Vince
- Pat Roach as Billy
- Maurice Roeves as Cam Colvin
- Denise Nelson as Running Villager ((Wee boy running)) Douglas Curivan
- Alan Baird as marauding villager / Original Big Man

== Production ==
Filmed at locations in Coalburn, Glasgow and Spain. while filming the main cast stayed in spare rooms of families in Douglas and Coalburn. Both Billy and Liam stayed at Springhill Crescent in Douglas.

== Reception ==
=== Critical reception ===
The Radio Times wrote "the script turns cartwheels to gain resonance from Mrs Thatcher's duel with the miners, but to little avail: the picture is "pumped-up" yet irredeemably dull." whereas Time Out described the film as "one of Britain's finest existential thrillers in ages...There are minor flaws, but as a portrait of one man's desperate struggle to survive against all odds, the film is tough, taut and intelligently critical of the man's world it depicts."

Neeson was disappointed by the critical reaction to the film. He stated:

I think it's a fabulous film. It had an expanse, an epicness to it, it was very brave and I thought it worked. But the critics! I think it was the Daily Telegraph which said the only country where a film like this would find an audience is Romania! Just out-and-out hatred.

=== Box office ===
The film opened at the Odeon West End and grossed £24,727 in its opening week. It went on to gross £268,000 in the UK.
