= Musselburgh =

Town in East Lothian, Scotland

Coordinates: 55°56′31″N 3°3′15″W

Musselburgh: Scottish Gaelic: Baile nam Feusgan; Scots: Musselburrae; The Honest Toun
- Coastal town
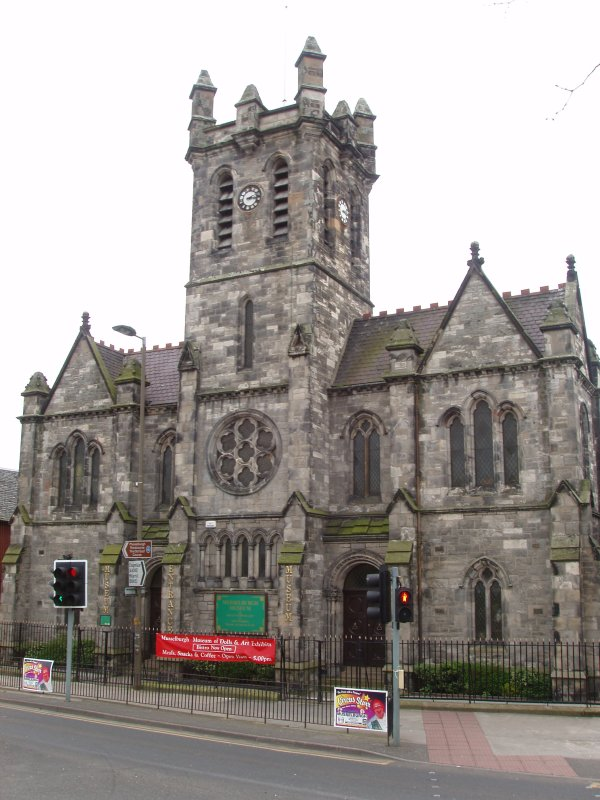
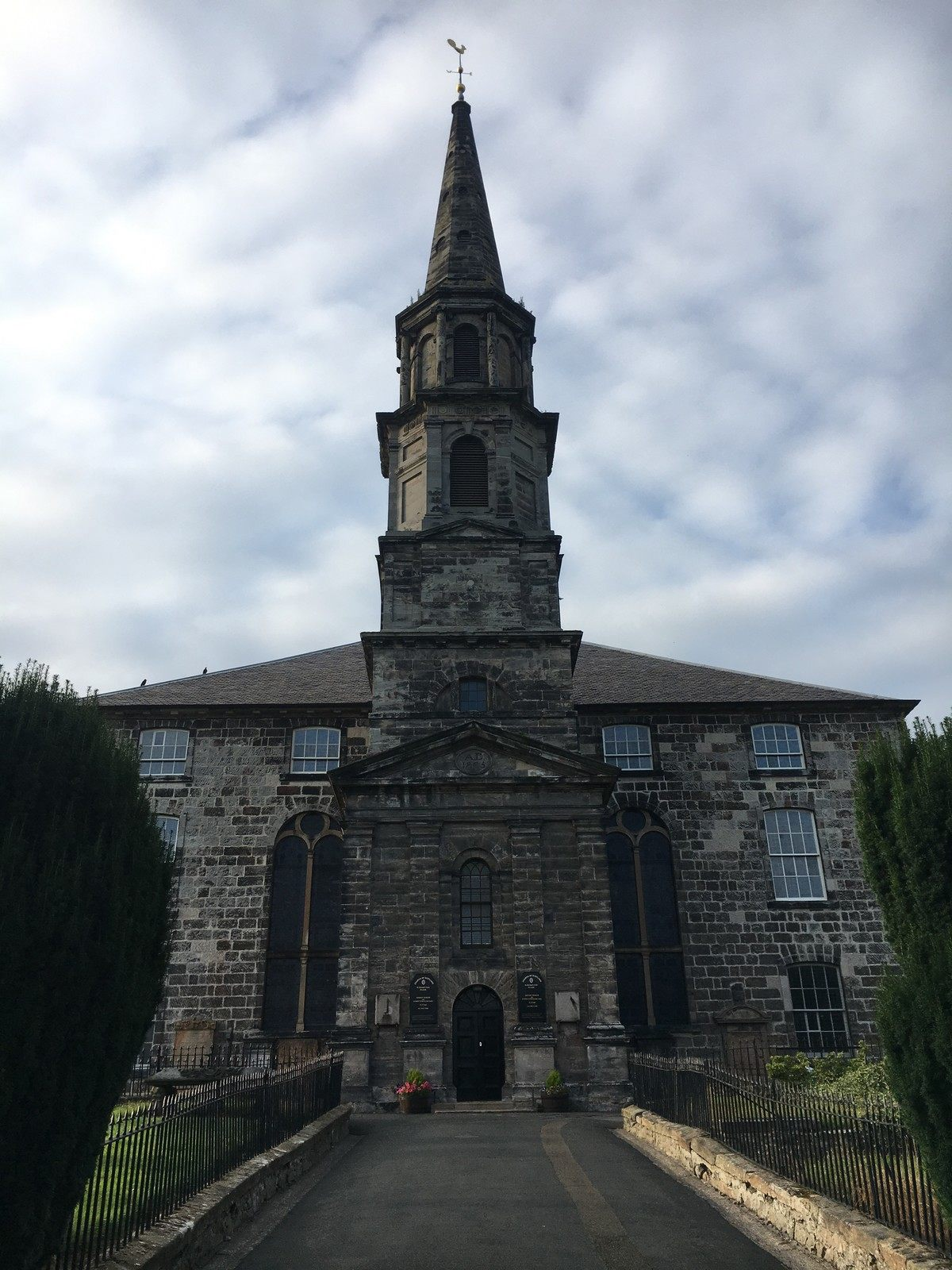
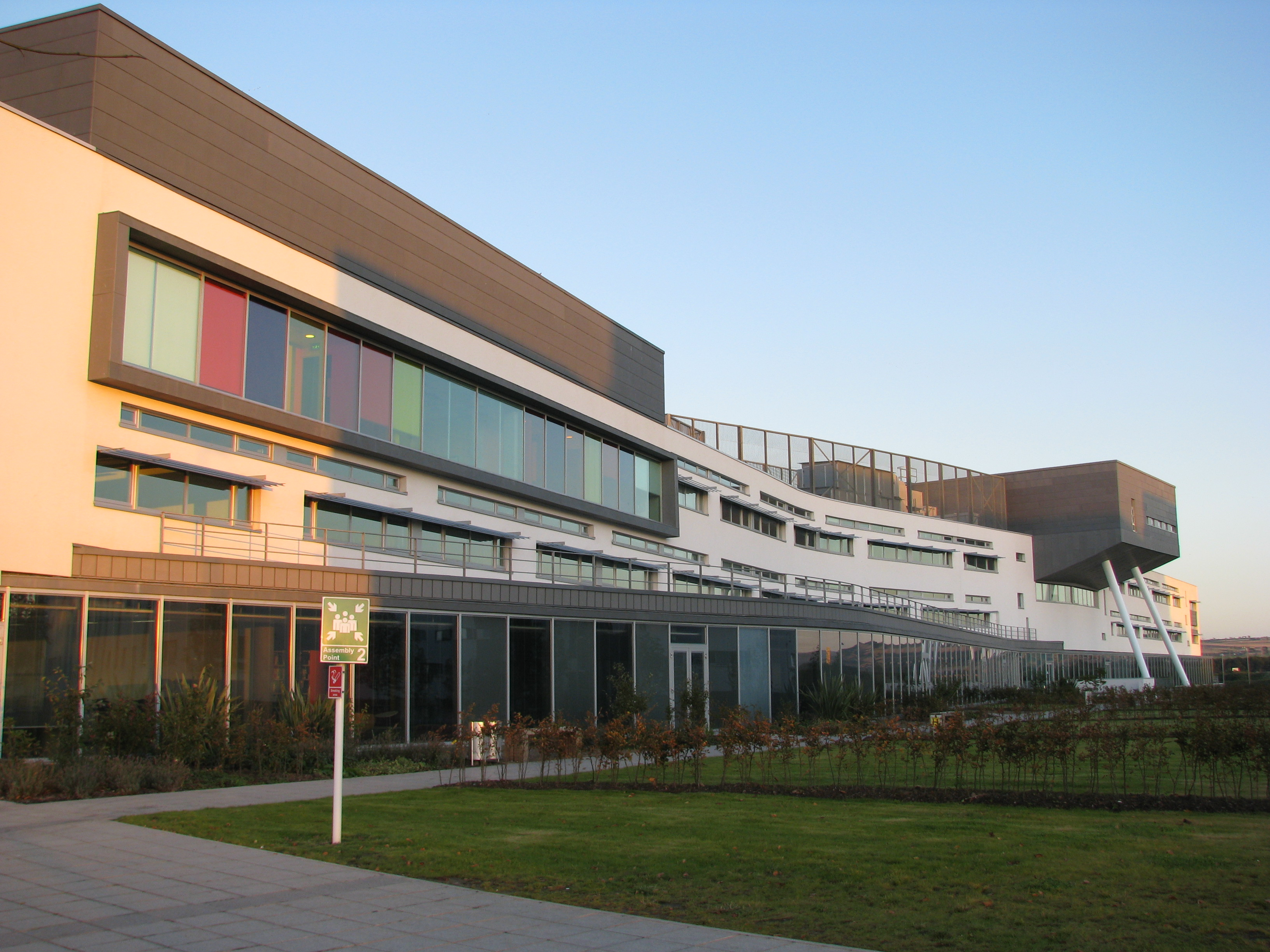
- Musselburgh Tolbooth Musselburgh Museum St Michael's Parish Church Musselburgh Archer statue Queen Margaret University

- Location within East Lothian
- Population: 21,479 (2022)
  - Edinburgh: 5 mi (8 km)
  - London: 329 mi (529 km)
- Civil parish: Inveresk
- Community council: Musselburgh and Inveresk
- Council area: East Lothian
- Lieutenancy area: East Lothian
- Country: Scotland
- Sovereign state: United Kingdom
- Post town: MUSSELBURGH
- Postcode district: EH21
- Dialling code: 0131
- Police: Scotland
- Fire: Scottish
- Ambulance: Scottish
- UK Parliament: Edinburgh East and Musselburgh
- Scottish Parliament: Edinburgh Eastern, Musselburgh and Tranent

Musselburgh (/ˈmʌsəlbərə/; Scots: Musselburrae; Scottish Gaelic: Baile nam Feusgan) is a historic coastal town in East Lothian, Scotland, on the shore of the Firth of Forth. The town sits at the mouth of the River Esk, approximately 5 miles (8 km) east of Edinburgh, 46 miles (74 km) east of Glasgow, and 91 miles (146 km) south-southwest of Aberdeen. It is the largest settlement in East Lothian, with a population of 21,479 in 2022.

Musselburgh is nicknamed the "Honest Toun" and is believed to be the oldest existing town in Scotland, with history dating back to the Roman era. The town is home to Queen Margaret University and Musselburgh Links, one of the world's oldest golf courses.

== History ==
The name Musselburgh is Old English in origin, with mussel referring to the shellfish. (Note: Musselburgh was famous for the mussel beds which grew in the Firth of Forth; after many years of claims that the mussels were unsafe for consumption, a movement has been started to reestablish the mussel beds as a commercial venture.) The burgh element appears to derive from burh, in the same way as Edinburgh, before the introduction of formal burghs by David I. Its earliest Anglic name was Eskmuthe (Eskmouth) for its location at the mouth of the River Esk.

Musselburgh was first settled by the Romans in the years following their invasion of Scotland in 80 AD. They built a fort a little inland from the mouth of the River Esk, at Inveresk.

They bridged the Esk downstream from the fort, and thus established the line of the main eastern approach to Scotland's capital for most of the next 2,000 years. The bridge built by the Romans outlasted them by many centuries. It was rebuilt on the original Roman foundations some time before 1300, and in 1597 it was rebuilt again, this time with a third arch added on the east side of the river. The Old Bridge is also known as the Roman Bridge and remains in use today by pedestrians. To its north is the New Bridge, designed by John Rennie the Elder and built in 1806. This in turn was considerably widened in 1925.

Musselburgh was made a burgh of barony c.1315 and a burgh of regality in 1562. The town attempted to become a royal burgh in 1632 but this was prevented by opposition from Edinburgh burgesses. Although Edinburgh is now known to have been a burgh by 1125, Musselburgh's antiquity is reflected in the Scots-language traditional rhyme:

Musselburgh was a burgh
When Edinburgh was nane,
And Musselburgh will be a burgh
When Edinburgh's gane.

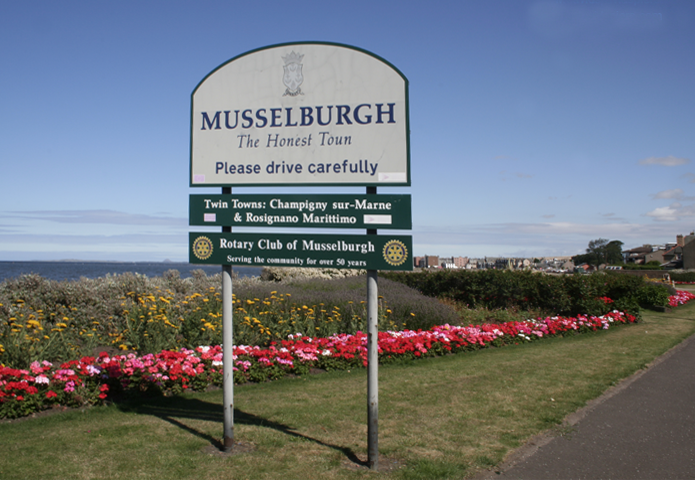
"Welcome to the Honest Toun"

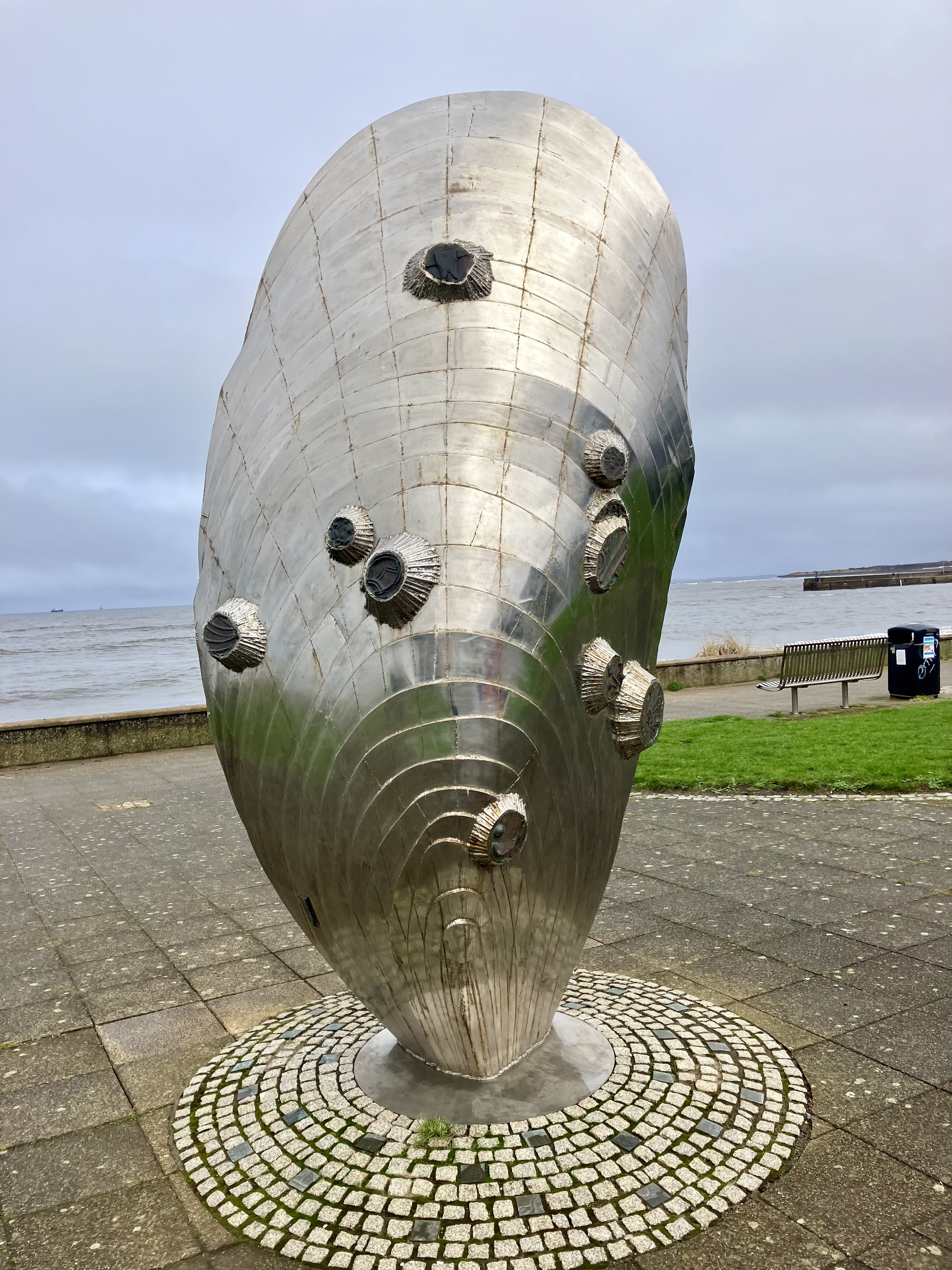
Monument to the town's eponymous shellfish

Musselburgh is known as "the Honest Toun", and celebrates this by the annual election of the Honest Lad and Lass. The town motto "Honestas" dates back to 1332, when the Regent of Scotland, Randolph, Earl of Moray, died in the burgh after a long illness during which he was devotedly cared for by the townsfolk. His successor offered to reward the people for their loyalty but they declined, saying they were only doing their duty. The new regent, the Earl of Mar, was impressed and said they were a set of honest men, hence "Honest Toun".

Archaeological excavations by Headland Archaeology between 2003 and 2004, as part of work to renew the water mains, found that the medieval town was concentrated on the High Street and that occupation in the North High Street area and Fisherrow only dates to the 16th century or later. The early town was centred on the eastern side of the river Esk.

Musselburgh is home to the Palladian Manor House of Newhailes, which dates back to 1702 and was home to eight generations of the Dalrymple family, who in the 18th century were a prominent political and legal force within Scotland. The house and grounds are now managed by the National Trust for Scotland.

Stoneyhill House dates from the mid 18th century. The estate of Stoneyhill was formerly owned by Sir William Sharp and later passed to the Earl of Wemyss, the notorious Francis Charteris.

The population was 6,331 inhabitants in 1841.

The town and its population grew considerably throughout the latter half of the twentieth century, with major local authority and private housing developments on both the eastern and western outskirts.

The Battle of Pinkie, part of the Rough Wooing between Scotland and England, was fought south of Musselburgh in 1547.

=== Town Council ===
Prior to the local government reforms of 1975, Musselburgh was a small burgh within the county of Midlothian. As such, it elected a town council responsible for a number of areas of local governance, including housing, lighting and street cleaning and drainage. Midlothian County Council was responsible for other areas, including education. The town council met at the Musselburgh Tolbooth and later, for a short period before its abolition, at the Brunton Hall. The town's civic head and chairman of the council was the provost and there were three bailies and a treasurer.

Provost	Party	Term
David Lowe	Independent	1928–37
John Henry Paton	Independent	1937–40
Thomas White	Labour	1940–45
Daniel Feeney	Labour	1946–49
Robert Hunter	Labour	1949–56
Joseph H. F. Reid	Moderate	1956–57
James Lannan	Labour	1957–60
Peter Hamilton	Labour	1960–63
Robert Arthur	Labour	1963–66
Thomas White	Labour	1966–69
William Caird	Ratepayers	1969–72
Jessie B. Burns	Labour	1972–75

After the local government reforms of 1975, Musselburgh was transferred to the East Lothian district of the new Lothian region, and subsequently became part of the East Lothian unitary council area in 1996.

== Demography ==
=== Population ===
At the 2022 census, the population was 21,479 and 79.2% of residents were born in Scotland, 9.5% other UK, 7.2% Europe and 4.1% Other.

Ethnicity	Musselburgh	Scotland
White	95.2%	92.9%
Asian	2.2%	3.9%
Black	0.6%	1.2%
Mixed	0.7%	1.1%
Other	1.3%	0.9%

=== Religion ===
At the 2011 Census, 52% of Musselburgh residents stated they belonged to a religion, with 51% being Christians, and there are several churches catering to different denominations.

Religion (2022)
Religion	Number	%
Christian (total)	7,352	36.4%
No religion	12,243	60.6%
Church of Scotland	3,976	19.7%
Roman Catholic	2,221	11.0%
Religion not stated	1,237	11.5%
Other Christian	1,155	5.7%
Muslim	237	1.2%
Other religion	380	1.9%

==== Church of Scotland ====
There are three Church of Scotland ecclesiastical parishes in Musselburgh, each with its own church, however discussions are currently underway regarding the future of these three churches and possible amalgamation:

- North Esk
- St. Andrew's High
- St. Michael's, Inveresk

==== Roman Catholicism ====
There is one Roman Catholic congregation which worships at Our Lady of Loretto and St Michael Catholic Church.

==== Scottish Episcopal Church ====
There is one Scottish Episcopal congregation which worships at St Peter's Church.

==== Other churches ====
- Harbour Church
- Hope Church
- Musselburgh Baptist Church
- Musselburgh Congregational Church

== Education ==
Schools include Loretto School, a private boarding school, and Musselburgh Grammar School, the local state secondary school that is one of the oldest grammar schools in the country, dating from 1608. Primary schools include: Campie Primary School, Musselburgh Burgh Primary School, Stoneyhill Primary School, Pinkie St Peter's Primary School, Loretto RC Primary School and Loretto Nippers (private). Early learning locations (ages 3–5) include The Burgh, Stoneyhill, Loretto RC, and St. Ninian's. There are also several private nurseries for pre school aged children. Queen Margaret University relocated all its schools from Edinburgh to Musselburgh in 2007. Her Majesty The Queen officially opened the QMU campus in July 2008.

== Transport ==
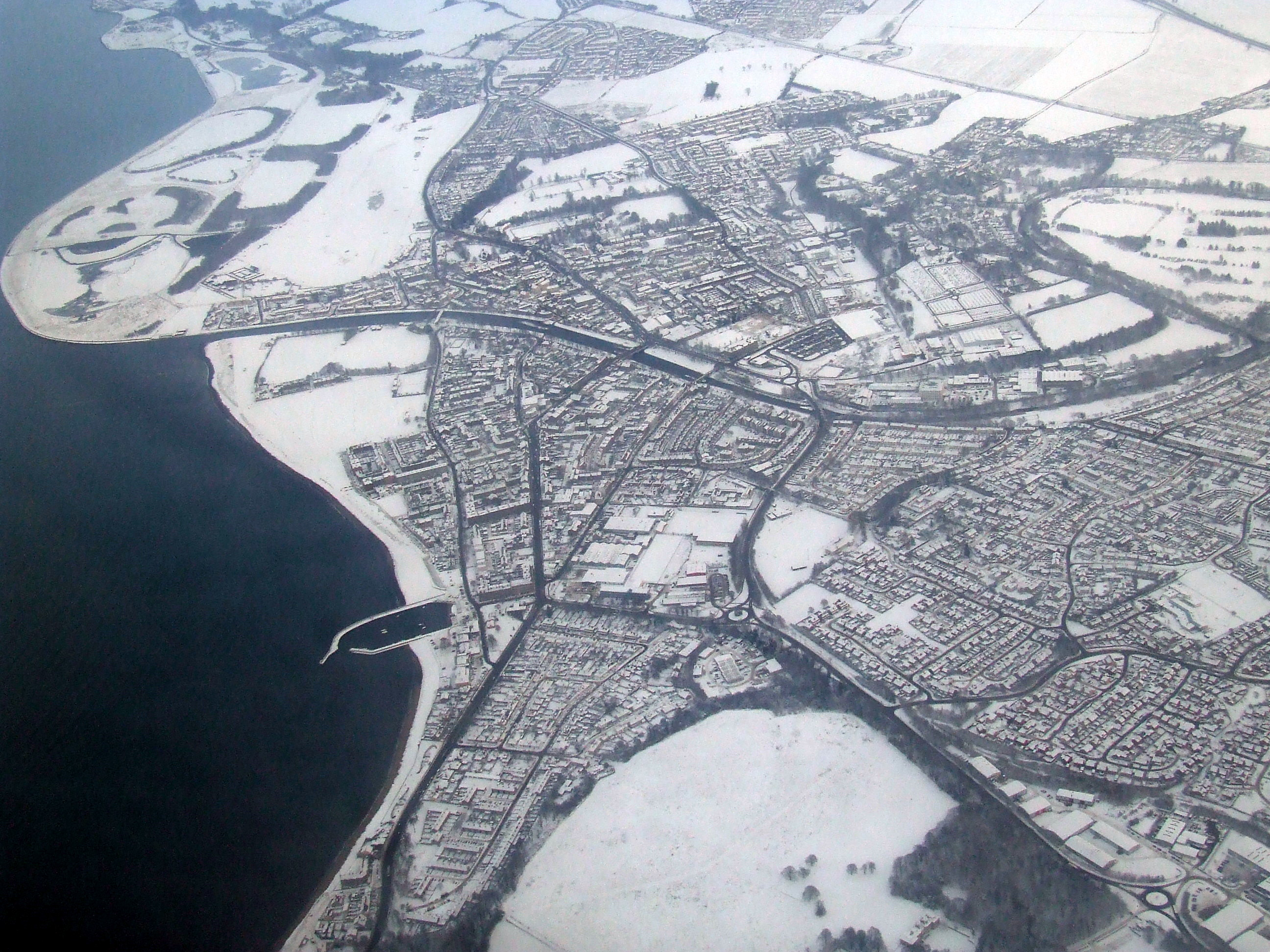
Musselburgh from the air (winter)

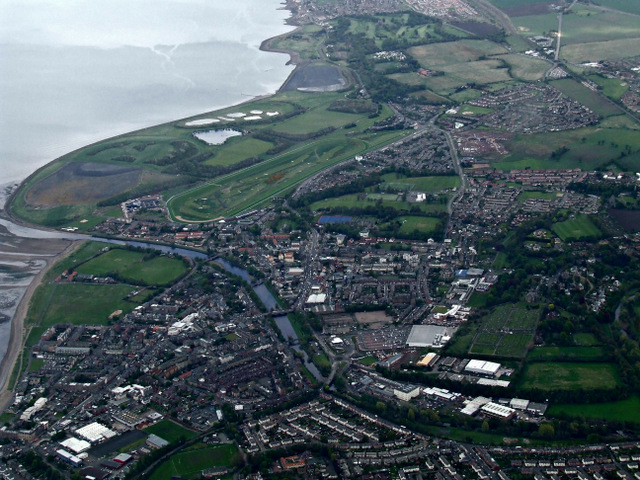
Musselburgh from the air (summer)

=== Railway ===
Musselburgh is served by two railway stations. Musselburgh railway station is in the west of the town adjacent to Queen Margaret University and has regular ScotRail services from Edinburgh Waverley to North Berwick. It is a relatively new station, having opened in 1988. The other station serving the town is Wallyford railway station to the east of the town in the village of Wallyford, which opened in 1994.

The town's original station was close to the town centre at the end of a short branch from Newhailes Junction. Passenger services from there ceased in 1964, and the line closed to all traffic in the early 1970s. The former railway line is now a road bypassing the Fisherrow area of the town. There was also a station at Fisherrow.

=== Bus ===
The town is served by Lothian Buses, East Coast Buses and Prentice Coaches Ltd.

=== Roads ===
The A1 by-passes the town and meets the A720 Edinburgh City Bypass at the edge of the town before continuing to Edinburgh city centre. The A199 goes through the High Street to Edinburgh in the west and to Dunbar to the east. This was originally the A1 until the town's bypass was built in the mid-1980s.

== Sport ==
The Musselburgh Silver Arrow is reputed to be the oldest sporting trophy in United Kingdom, and is competed for annually by the Royal Company of Archers. It dates back to at least 1603.

Musselburgh is home to both Musselburgh Racecourse and Musselburgh Links golf course. The links, a former venue of golf's Open Championship, have recently been acknowledged as the oldest continuously played golf course in the world. Musselburgh Athletic F.C. are the town's football team, competing in the East of Scotland League at their Olivebank Park ground in the west of the town. Musselburgh also has some grassroots teams for young players, such as the Musselburgh Windsor and the Musselburgh Youngstars. Musselburgh RFC play in the Scottish Premiership at Stoneyhill.

The Musselburgh Roads Cycling Club was formed in January 1936 by a breakaway group of 16 from the Musselburgh Clarion. After forming an alliance with other clubs during the war, the MRCC reformed again in its own right in January 1945. The club has a long and successful history of competitive cycling. Notable riders include: Jock Allison, who in 1945 won the British Best All Rounder title and is to date still the only Scottish club rider to do so; Janet Sutherland, who dominated Scottish woman's cycling in 1951–4; and Sandy Gilchrist, who in 1977 won 5 individual and 4 team Scottish Championships. Many other riders from the club have won national championships or have been selected to compete at world championship level or the Commonwealth Games. Today, club members take part in track racing, road racing, time trials, cyclo cross and mountain biking. Their base is at the Tolbooth in the High Street.

There is also a locally run darts league, the Musselburgh and District Darts League, comprising an A and B league, each containing eight teams. Many players from this league represent the Lothian team at county level.

In Musselburgh there is also an amateur swimming club called Musselburgh Amateur Swimming Club. The club is home to the Musselburgh Marlins and trains at Musselburgh Sports Centre. The club was first established in 1886 and in its current format in 1994 where they trained at Loretto Swimming Pool which is now closed.

The East Lothian Seagulls of the Scottish Floorball League are based in Musselburgh and train and play matches at the sports centre at Queen Margaret University.

== Notable people ==
Seal of Musselburgh

Seal of Musselburgh

Acting

- James Martin, best known for his role as Eric in Still Game. Although originally from Glasgow, he has lived in East Lothian since 1974.
- Callum Kerr, actor and musician

Medicine

- David Macbeth Moir, physician and writer

Military

- John Grieve, recipient of the Victoria Cross

Writers and artists

- Alexander Carrick, sculptor
- Margaret Oliphant, novelist and historical writer, who usually wrote as Mrs Oliphant

Sports

- Gary Anderson, darts player
- Barney Battles Jr., footballer
- Alistair Brown, footballer
- Billy Brown, football coach
- John Clark, footballer
- Jason Holt, footballer
- Willie Jamieson, footballer
- Jim Jefferies, football manager
- John McGlynn, football manager
- Michael McKenna, footballer
- Paul McLean, footballer
- Bill McPhillips, footballer
- Kenny Miller, footballer
- Alan Morgan, footballer
- Ross Muir, professional snooker player
- Scott Murray, rugby union player
- Yvonne Murray, athlete
- Colin Nish, footballer
- Willie Ormond, footballer and manager
- Kirsten Reilly, footballer
- Kris Renton, footballer
- George Walker, footballer
- John White, footballer

Various

- Callum Beattie, singer-songwriter
- Rhona Cameron, comedian
- Maggie Dickson, salt maker and hanging survivor
- Kirsten Imrie, professional model and former Page Three girl

== Areas ==
Fisherrow, Inveresk, Levenhall Links, Pinkie, Stoneyhill, Clayknowes, Denholm, Stoneybank, Queen Margaret University Student Village, Monktonhall, Pinkie Braes

== Twin towns ==
Musselburgh is twinned with:

- Champigny-sur-Marne, Val-de-Marne, France
- Rosignano Marittimo, Tuscany, Italy

"Champigny was already twinned with Rosignano, so a three-way link was considered advantageous."

== Gallery ==
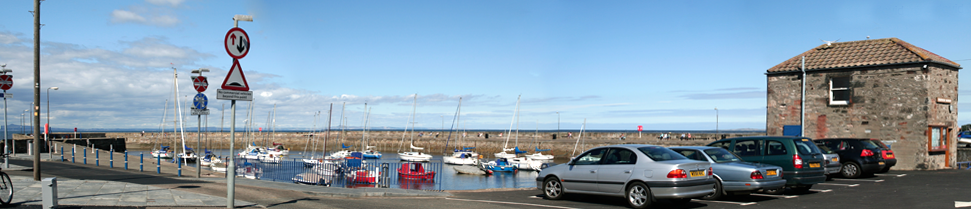
A panoramic view of Fisherrow harbour and its pleasure craft

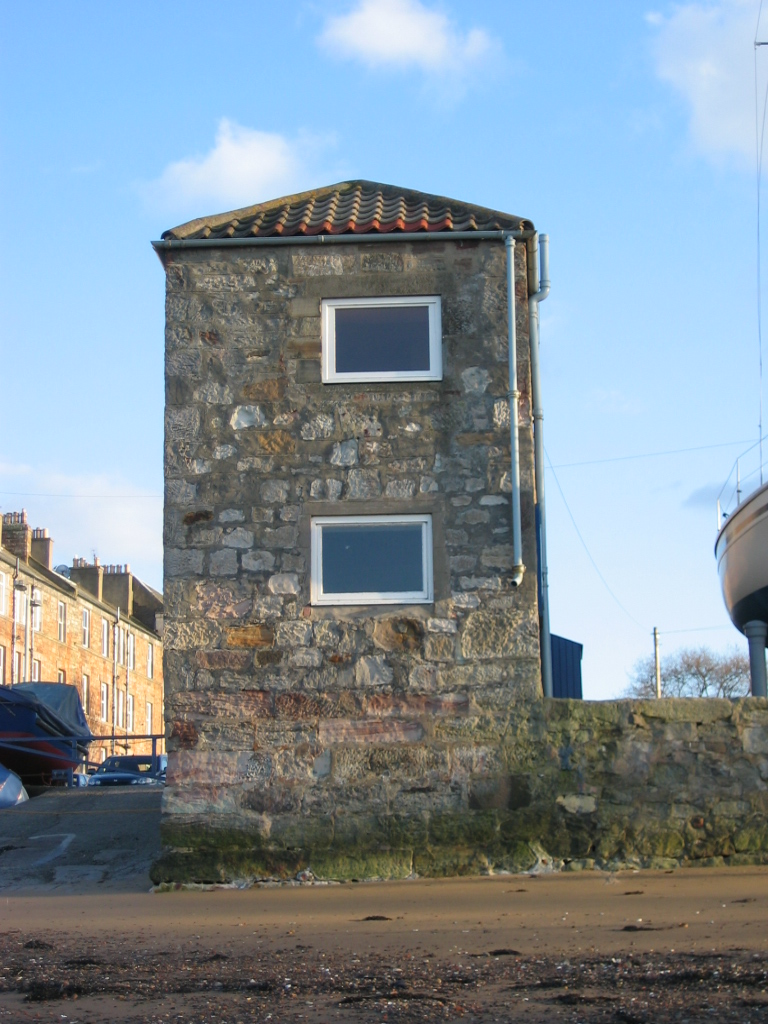
Harbour Master's Office at Fisherrow

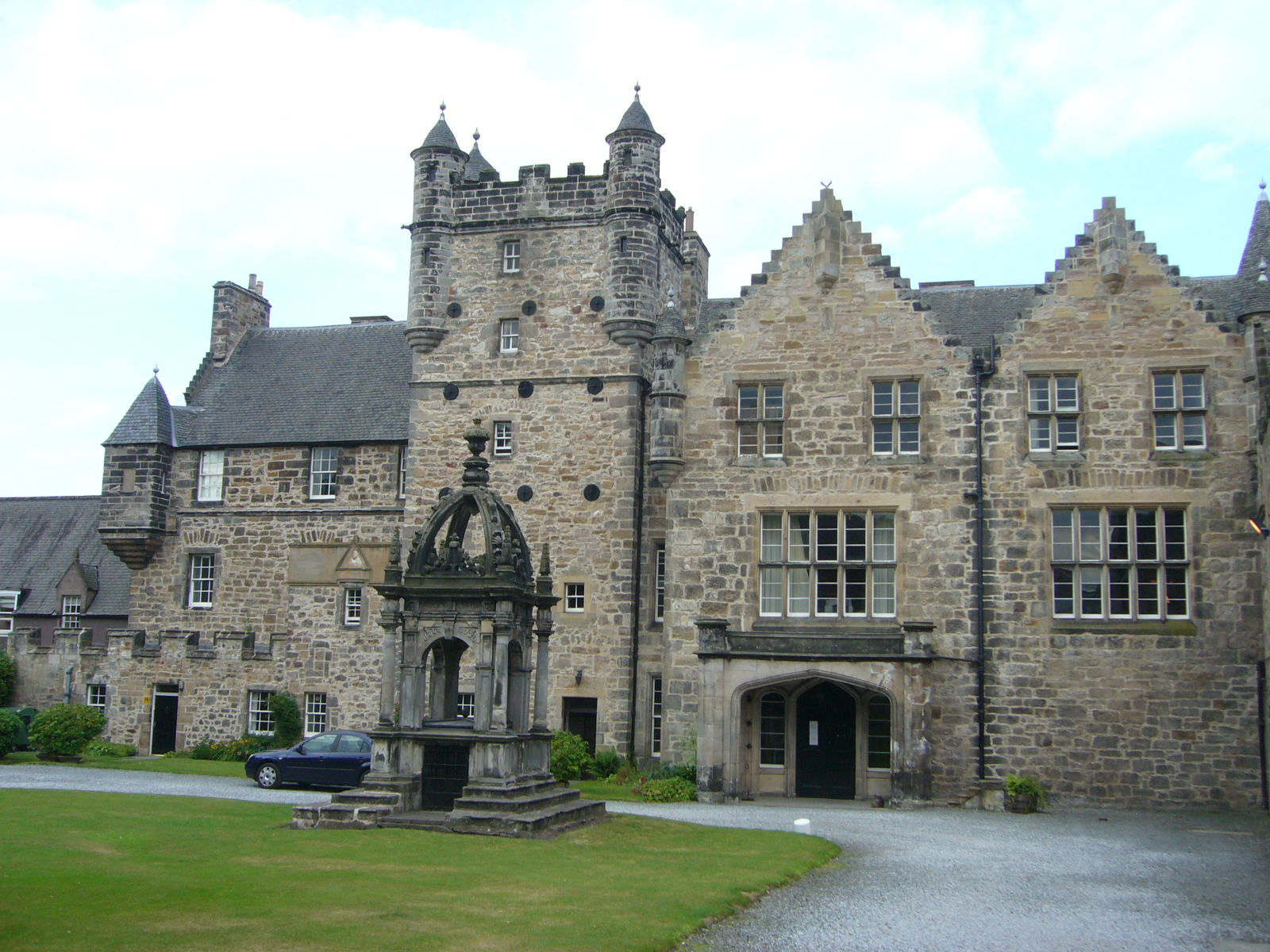
Pinkie House, now one of the buildings of Loretto School

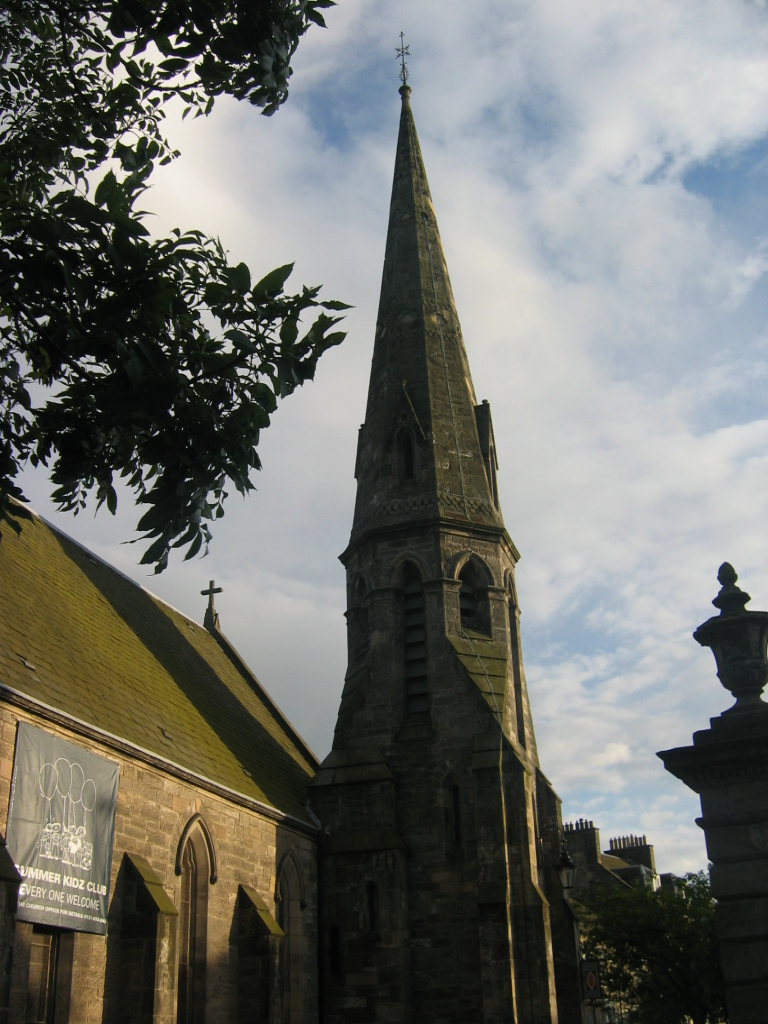
Scottish Episcopal church on the High Street

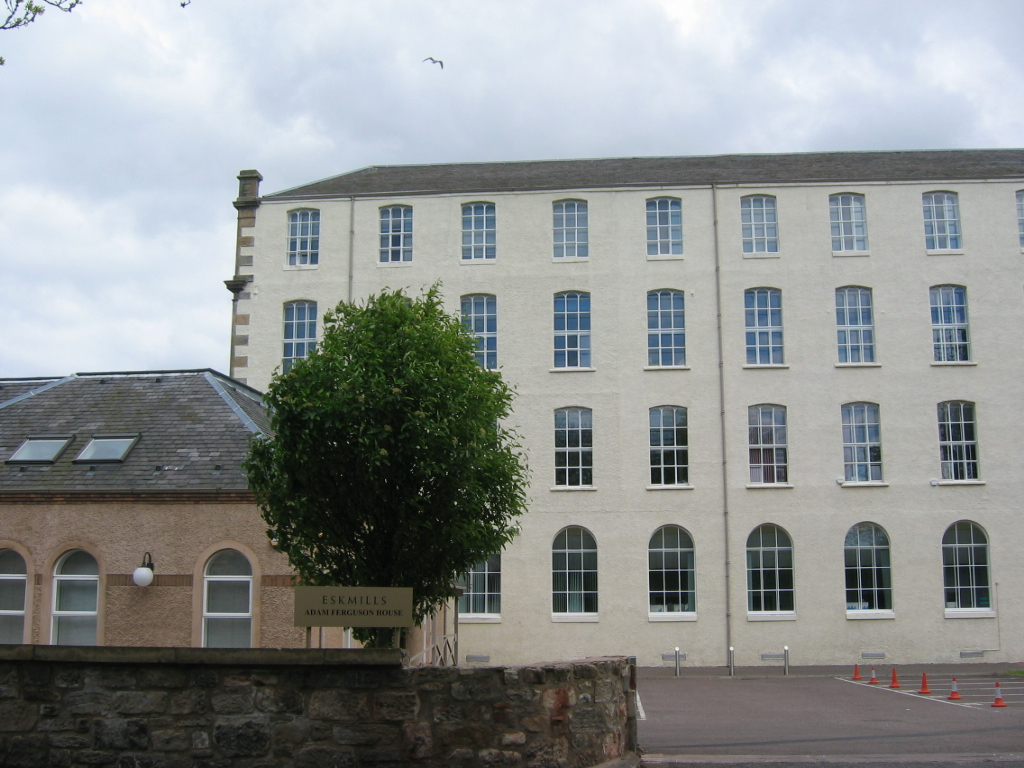
Eskmills, a former factory complex, is transformed into a business park

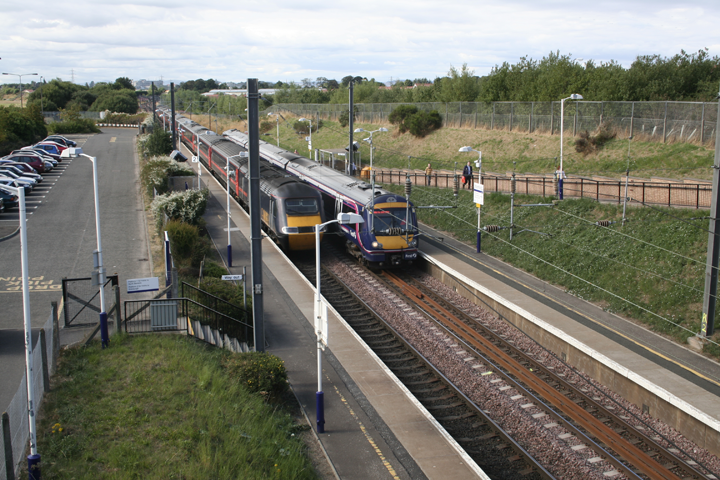
Musselburgh railway station, showing a local eastbound (North Berwick) train, and a westbound (Edinburgh) intercity (125) train

Brunton Hall provides access to East Lothian Council's services, as well as a theatre and restaurant

Brunton Hall, from the west of the town

== See also ==
- John Muir Way
- List of places in East Lothian
