= Wallyford railway station =

Railway station in East Lothian, Scotland

Wallyford
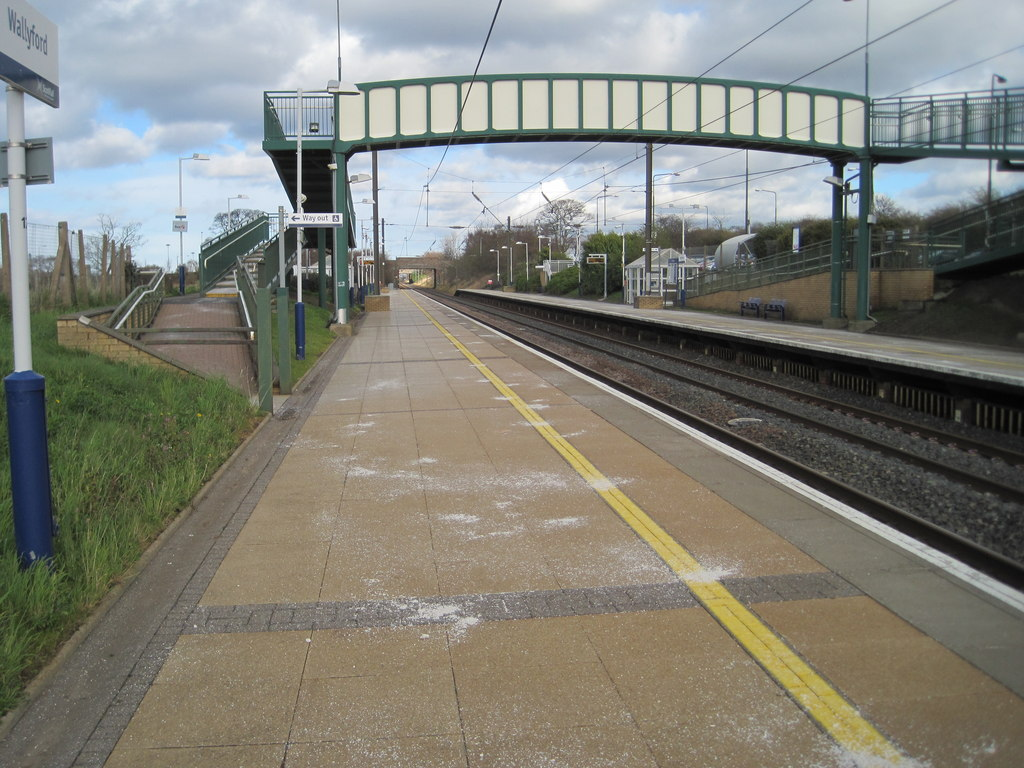

General information
- Location: Wallyford, East Lothian; Scotland
- Coordinates: 55.9405°N 3.0147°W
- Grid reference: NT366723
- Managed by: ScotRail
- Platforms: 2

Other information
- Station code: WAF

History
- Original company: Railtrack

Key dates
- June 1866: Opened
- October 1867: Closed
- 13 June 1994: Reopened

Passengers
- 2020/21: ▼36,444
- 2021/22: ▲0.152 million
- 2022/23: ▲0.209 million
- 2023/24: ▲0.286 million
- 2024/25: ▲0.349 million
Location
Notes
- Passenger statistics from the Office of Rail and Road

Wallyford railway station is a railway station serving the village of Wallyford, East Lothian near Musselburgh in Scotland. It is located on the East Coast Main Line, 7 1/2 miles (12.1 km) east of Edinburgh Waverley. It was opened by Railtrack in 1994 and is served by trains on the North Berwick Line.

== Early history ==
There was a short lived station on the site which was opened by the North British Railway in June 1866 and closed in October 1867.

== Facilities ==
The station is unstaffed, but a ticket machine is provided in the waiting shelter on platform 2 to allow intending passengers to buy before boarding or for collecting pre-paid tickets. A shelter is also provided on platform 1. Train running information is offered via CIS screens, customer help points, automated announcements and timetable poster boards. Step-free access to each platform is available via ramps from the nearby road and car park.

== Services ==
Monday to Friday, there is an hourly service in each direction (half hour during peak times) between Edinburgh Waverley and North Berwick. During Saturday daytimes, there is a half hourly service westbound to Edinburgh and eastbound to North Berwick. Evenings and Sundays, there is an hourly service in each direction.

There is also a train every two hours to Dunbar on Mondays to Saturdays only.

Preceding station	National Rail	Following station
Prestonpans	ScotRail; North Berwick Line	Musselburgh
East Linton	ScotRail; Edinburgh–Dunbar	Musselburgh
