= Liam McIlvanney =

Scottish–New Zealand writer and academic

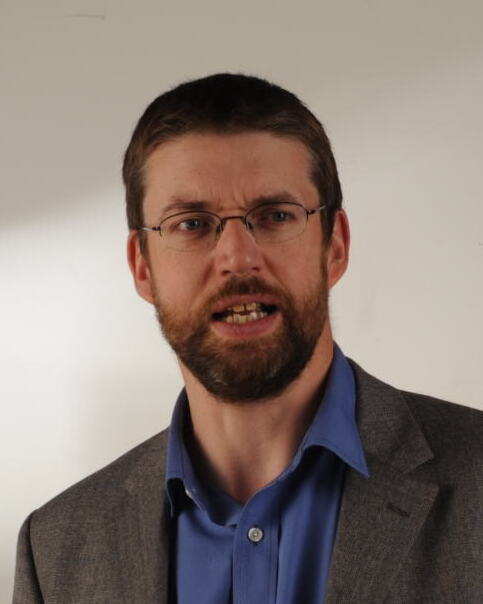
McIlvanney in 2010

Liam McIlvanney is a Scottish-born crime fiction writer and academic at the University of Otago in Otago, New Zealand, and the inaugural holder of the Stuart Chair in Scottish studies at the university. He is the son of William McIlvanney. Notable students include author Majella Cullinane.

== Career ==
In September 2025, McIlvanney was a guest on the Off the Shelf podcast as part of a feature on the McIlvanney Prize.

=== Fiction ===
- All the Colours of the Town (2009)
- Where the Dead Men Go (2013)
- The Quaker (2018)
- The Heretic (2022)
- The Good Father (2025)

=== Nonfiction ===
- Burns the Radical: Poetry and Politics in Late Eighteenth-Century Scotland (2002)

== Awards ==
- The Saltire First Book Award
- Ngaio Marsh Award for Best New Zealand Crime Novel (2014)
- McIlvanney Prize for the Scottish Crime Book of the Year (2018)
