= Musselburgh railway station (1847) =

Railway station in Scotland (1847-1970)

Musselburgh

General information
- Location: Musselburgh, East Lothian; Scotland
- Coordinates: 55.94065°N 3.05738°W
- Grid reference: NT34057246
- Platforms: 1

Other information
- Status: Disused

History
- Original company: North British Railway
- Pre-grouping: North British Railway
- Post-grouping: London and North Eastern Railway

Key dates
- 14 July 1847: Station opened
- 9 September 1964: Station closed (passengers)
- 7 December 1970: Station closed (freight)
Location

Musselburgh railway station served the town of Musselburgh, Scotland. Services were provided by trains on the Musselburgh Branch.

An existing station also named Musselburgh had opened a year earlier in 1846, on the East Coast Main Line, this station was renamed as Inveresk railway station when the 1847 Musselburgh station opened.

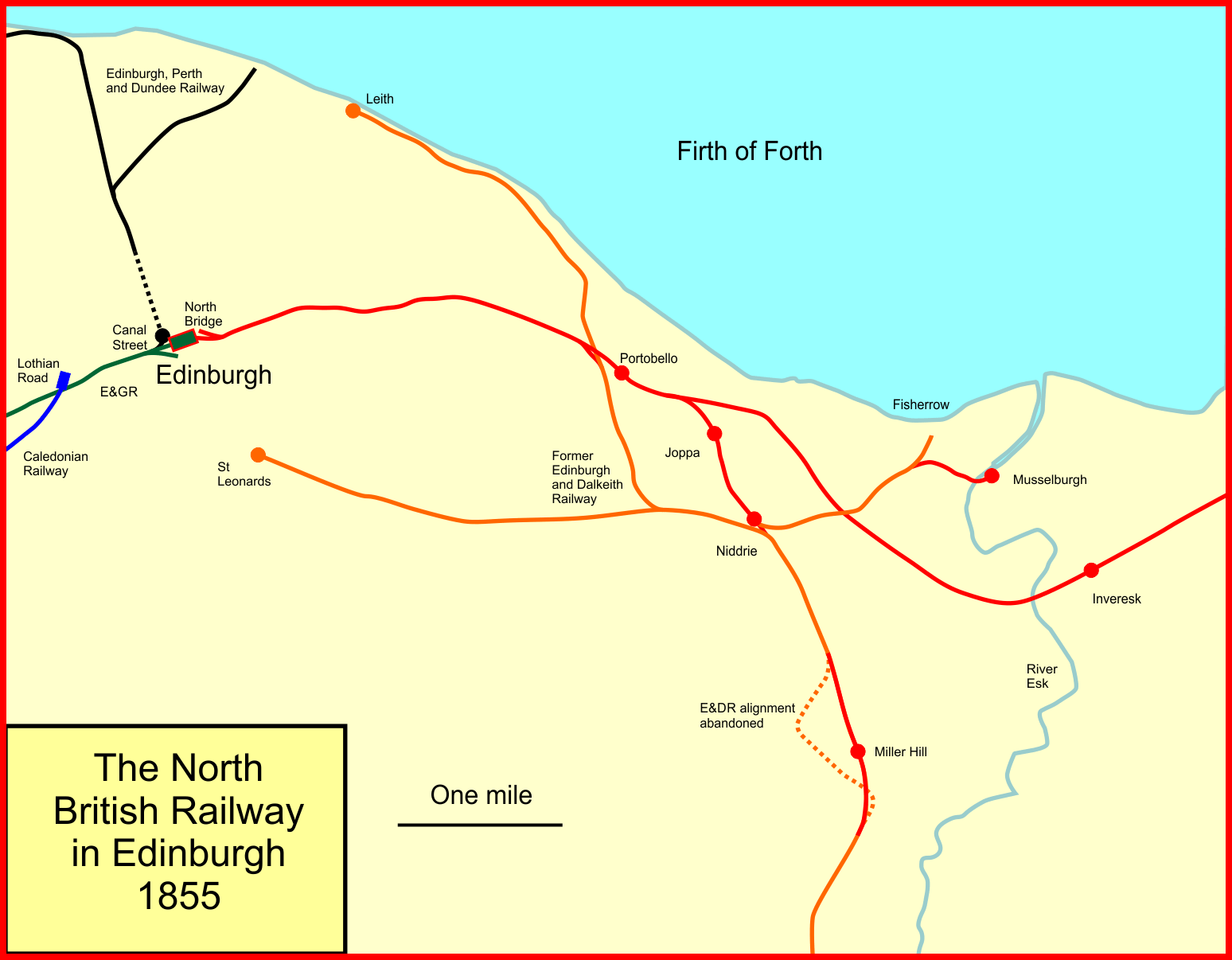
Connections between the Musselburgh Branch and other NBR lines in 1855

== History ==
The station was opened by the North British Railway in 1847 on the newly constructed Musselburgh Branch which crossed over the river Esk into the centre of the town.

The line passed on to the London and North Eastern Railway in 1923 and finally the Scottish Region of British Railways on nationalisation in 1948.

The station was closed to passengers in 1964 and to freight in 1970. Most of the former trackbed has now been converted for road use. The station site is now a car park.

== Replacement ==
A new Musselburgh railway station was opened by British Rail in 1988. However, unlike the previous station, it was opened on the existing East Coast Main Line on the western outskirts of the town.
