= Walking Wounded (short story collection) =

- First edition
- Author: William McIlvanney
- Publisher: Hodder & Stoughton
- Publication date: 1 January 1989
- Pages: 192
- ISBN: 9780340263303

Walking Wounded is a collection of short stories written by William McIlvanney (contains 192 pages) and published on 1 January 1989. Following a revival of interest in McIlvanney's writing, this book was reissued by Canongate Books in 2014.

== Plot ==
This interwoven collection of stories is set in the fictional Scottish town of Graithnock and captures the social and emotional struggles of ordinary people's lives.

The short stories included in this collection are:

1. Waving
  In this first story, Bert Watson, a manager in a clothing factory, is approached by one of his young workers, Duncan MacFarlane, with an outrageous request for a loan of a large sum of money and a long leave of absence. This encounter causes Bert to examine his own life.
2. Performance
  The performance is that of Fast Frankie White and this story explores his fragile grasp on a masculine self-image through a visit to a local bar.
3. On the sidelines
  John Hannah stands freezing on the touchline to watch his son play football and contemplates the breakdown of his marriage and his post-divorce life.
4. Death of a spinster
  The routine life and unfulfilled dreams of a spinster are brought sharply to focus in an ordinary day that meets with tragedy.
5. The Prisoner
  A recidivist house-burglar meets prison life and the prison governor, on his own terms.
6. Homecoming
  A chance encounter on a train brings throws light on a woman's relationship with her parents.
7. At the bar
  A man in a bar is looking for trouble, and meets his match.
8. In the steps of Spartacus
  A comic tale of an animal lover called Benny Mullen who names a greyhound Spartacus, the hero of the working man. Eventually realizing however that this was a dog that could indeed have brought Rome to its knees.
9. Sentences
  A grim view of one man's marriage through a scene in a bar.
10. Getting along
  This story provides a brief glimpse of one woman's life following the breakdown of her marriage.
11. Mick's day
  This story consists of a stark reflection on the day in the life of an unemployed man Mick Haggerty.
12. Tig
  An animal lover realizes his own idea of justice after an altercation in a bar.
13. Beached
  A widow visits the beach with her children and she clings to dreams of a life that can no longer be.
14. How many miles to Babylon?
  Benny Mullen returns in this story which sees him have an altercation with a colleague and contemplate his life as a widower.
15. Callers
  This short story consists of a series of answerphone messages which build up the tragic picture of a woman's life.
16. End game
  Gus McPhater and his wife fall out briefly over a copy of The Essential Schopenhauer.
17. Hullo again
  Eddie Cameron rediscovers an old flame.
18. Holing out
  Bert Watson returns in this story for one last game of golf.
19. Deathwatch beetle
  A grim portrait of prison life.
20. Dreaming
  A teenager, Sammy Nelson, who applied for a job with Bert Watson, but was considered over-qualified finds his own creative way to meet life on his terms.

== Reception ==
Writing in the Sunday Times, Mick Brown asserts that "McIlvanney's triumph is to find the consolation of hope even in the face of fatalistic despair, to find poetry in the cadences of common speech, and the inner sadness of his subjects' lives, while always reaffirming their fortitude and resilience."

== Awards ==
This book won the 1990 Glasgow Herald People's Prize.

McIlvanney wrote a screenplay based on one of these stories, "Dreaming", which was filmed by BBC Scotland in 1990 and won a BAFTA.
