= Musselburgh railway station =

Railway station in East Lothian, Scotland

Musselburgh Scottish Gaelic: Baile nam Feusgan
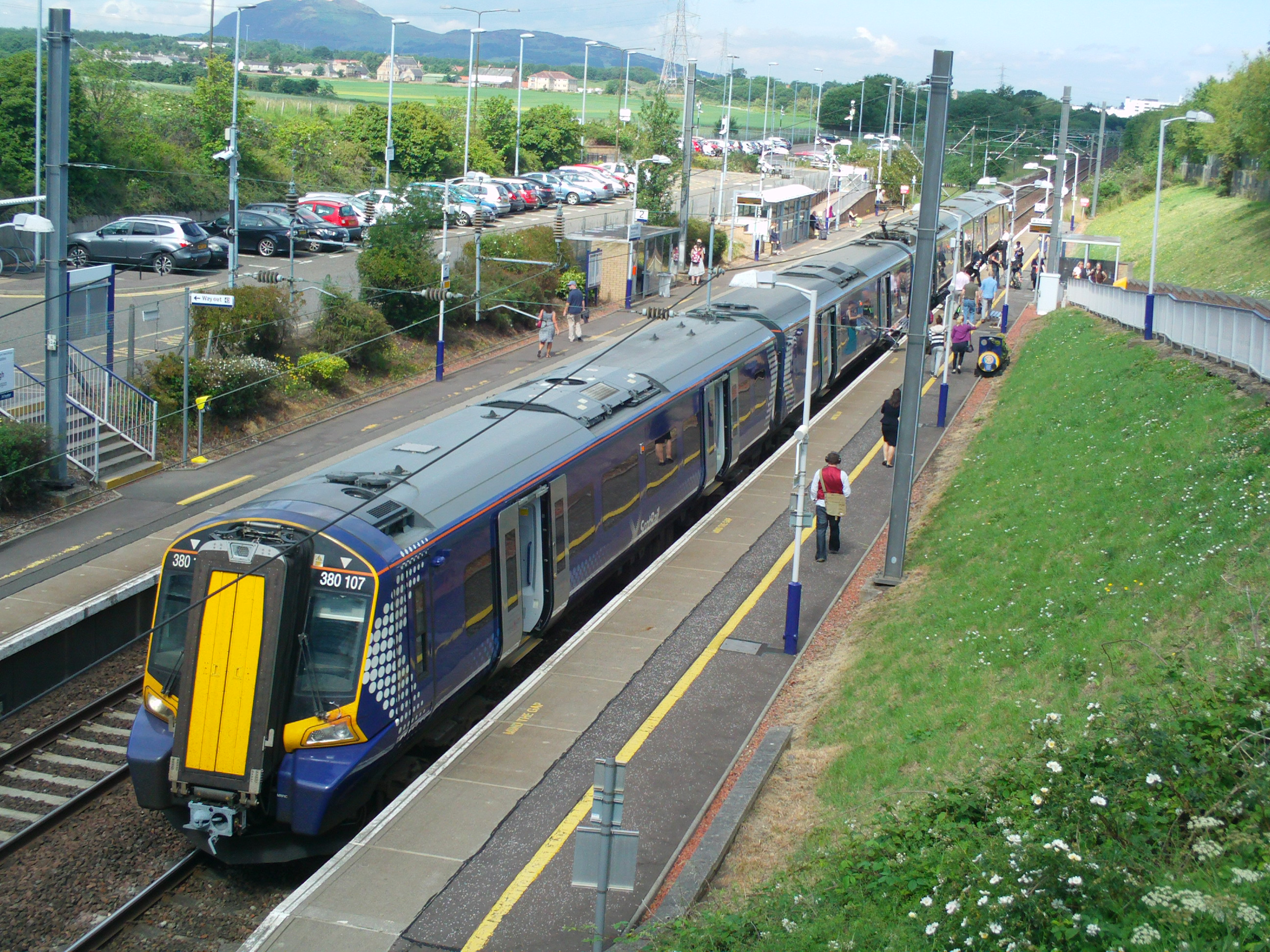
- A Class 380 calls, with a service to North Berwick

General information
- Location: Musselburgh, East Lothian, Scotland
- Coordinates: 55.9335°N 3.0725°W
- Grid reference: NT331716
- Manager: ScotRail
- Platforms: 2

Other information
- Station code: MUB

History
- Original company: British Rail

Key dates
- 3 October 1988: Opened

Passengers
- 2020/21: ▼86,958
- 2021/22: ▲0.267 million
- 2022/23: ▲0.350 million
- 2023/24: ▲0.451 million
- 2024/25: ▲0.461 million
- 2025/26: ▲0.498 million
Location
Notes
- Passenger statistics from the Office of Rail and Road

Musselburgh railway station serves the town of Musselburgh, in East Lothian, Scotland. It was opened by British Rail in 1988; it lies on the East Coast Main Line, 5 1/4 miles (8.4 km) east of Edinburgh Waverley, and the North Berwick Line. It is located near to the recently-built campus of the Queen Margaret University.

== History ==
Two stations of the same name were opened by North British Railway:

- The first station opened in June 1846, which was renamed a year later to Inveresk in July 1847. It closed in May 1964.
- The second Musselburgh station opened in July 1847 and was located alongside the River Esk, on its own branch line. It served the Edinburgh and Dalkeith line to Fisherrow, closing to passenger services in September 1964 and to goods services in December 1970.

== Facilities ==
The station has two platforms:

1. for eastbound trains to North Berwick and Dunbar
2. for westbound trains to Edinburgh Waverley and Haymarket.

Both have waiting shelters, CIS screens and customer help points. Platform 2 also has a self-service ticket machine in its shelter, to allow intending passengers to purchase prior to travel or collect pre-paid tickets; the station is unstaffed. Train running information is also provided via automatic announcements and timetable posters. Step-free access is available to each platform.

== Services ==
ScotRail operates the following service in trains per hour (tph):

- 3 tp2h westbound to Edinburgh Waverley; one morning peak-time service is extended to Haymarket
- 1 tph eastbound to North Berwick
- 1 tp2h eastbound to Dunbar.

Preceding station	National Rail	Following station
Wallyford	ScotRail; North Berwick Line	Edinburgh Waverley
Wallyford	ScotRail; Edinburgh–Dunbar	Edinburgh Waverley

== Bus connections ==
Lothian Buses routes 4, 30, N30, 46 and 48 stop near to the station.

== See also ==
- List of places in East Lothian
