= Inveresk railway station =

Closed railway station in East Lothian, Scotland

Inveresk

General information
- Location: Inveresk, East Lothian; Scotland
- Coordinates: 55.9316°N 3.0424°W
- Grid reference: NT349714
- Platforms: 2

Other information
- Status: Disused

History
- Original company: North British Railway
- Pre-grouping: North British Railway
- Post-grouping: LNER

Key dates
- 22 June 1846: Opened as Musselburgh
- July 1847: Renamed Inveresk
- 1 October 1876: Name changed to Inveresk Junction
- 2 June 1890: Name changed to Inveresk
- 4 May 1964: Closed to passengers
- 9 May 1970: Closed completely
Location

Inveresk railway station served the village of Inveresk, Midlothian (now East Lothian), Scotland from 1846 to 1964 on the East Coast Main Line.

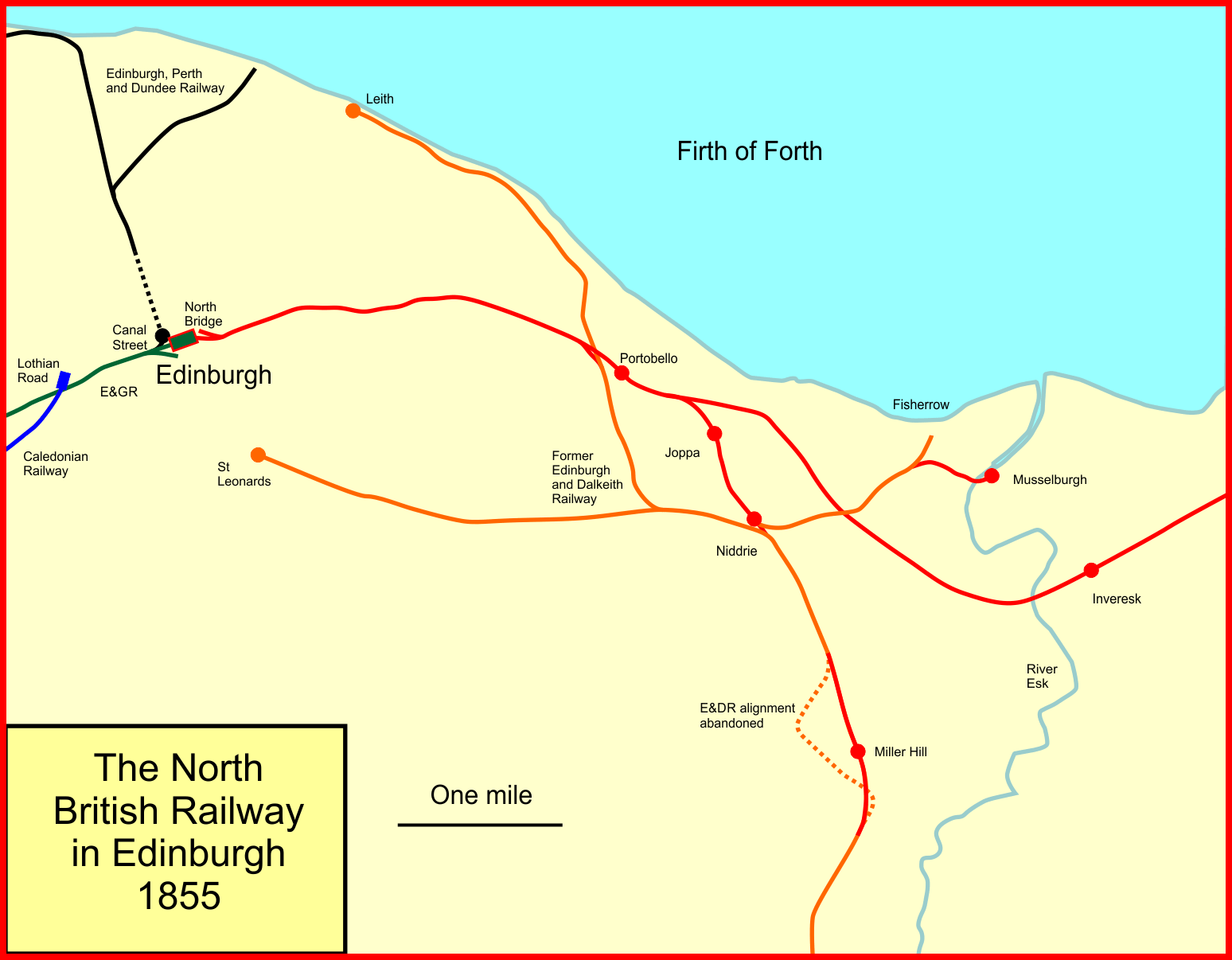
Location of Inveresk station and on the NBR lines in 1855

== History ==
The station was opened on 22 June 1846 by the North British Railway as Musselburgh. On 16 July 1847, the name was changed to Inveresk. The station was situated to the west of the current Wallyford railway station and to the east of the current Musselburgh railway station. Its name was changed to Inveresk Junction on 1 October 1876 but changed back to Inveresk on 2 June 1890. The passenger station closed on 4 May 1964 and the last goods service ran on 8 May 1970, thus the station closed completely the day after.

Preceding station	Historical railways	Following station
Newhailes	North British Railway; East Coast Main Line	Prestonpans
