= Alanna Knight =

British writer (1923–2020)

- Born: Gladys Allan Cleet; 24 February 1923; Jesmond, Newcastle, England
- Died: 2 December 2020 (aged 97); Edinburgh, Scotland
- Other name: Margaret Hope
- Occupation: Writer

Alanna Knight MBE (24 February 1923 – 2 December 2020), born Gladys Allan Cleet, was a British writer, based in Edinburgh. She wrote over sixty novels, including romances, mysteries, crime, historical, and time travel stories, as well as plays, biographies, and histories. She sometimes also published under the pen name Margaret Hope.

== Early life ==
Gladys Allan Cleet was from Jesmond, Newcastle, the daughter of Herbert Cleet and Gladys Allan Cleet. Her father was a butcher. She trained as a secretary as a young woman.

== Career ==
In 1964, in her forties, Knight became paralysed by polyneuritis (neuropathy), and her husband gave her an electric typewriter to help in her recovery. By the time the paralysis ended five years later, she had written her first novel, Legend of the Loch (1969). She would continue writing, publishing over sixty books in her last fifty years. Her best known series was the Inspector Faro mysteries, set in the nineteenth century, but she also wrote a series about a time-traveling detective, Tam Eildor, and series about women detectives; she wrote gothic romances, true crime, writing advice, memoirs, and biography.

Knight was honorary president of the Edinburgh Writers Club, a founder and honorary president of the Scottish Association of Writers, and an active member of the Crime Writers' Association. She taught creative writing and lectured on the topic in various settings, from universities to Bloody Scotland, a literary convention. She was also a portrait and landscape painter.

Knight was made a Member of the British Empire for services to literature in 2014.

== Personal life ==
Gladys Cleet married scientist Alistair Knight in 1951, in Aberdeen. They had two sons, Christopher and Kevin. She died in 2020 after suffering a stroke in Edinburgh at the age of 97.

== Selected bibliography ==
=== Fiction written as Margaret Hope ===
- The Queen's Captain (1978)
- The Shadow Queen (1979)
- Hostage Most Royal (1980)
- Perilous Voyage (1983)

=== Fiction written as Alanna Knight ===
Inspector Jeremy Faro mysteries:

1. Enter Second Murderer (1988)
2. Blood Line (1989)
3. Deadly Beloved (1989)
4. Killing Cousins (1990)
5. A Quiet Death (1991)
6. To Kill a Queen (1992)
7. The Evil that Men Do (1993)
8. The Missing Duchess (1994)
9. The Bull Slayers (1995)
10. Murder by Appointment (1996)
11. The Coffin Lane Murders (1998)
12. The Final Enemy (2002)
13. Unholy Trinity (2004, also known as Death at Carasheen)
14. Murder in Paradise (2008)
15. The Seal King Murders (2011)
16. Murder Most Foul (2013)
17. Akin to Murder (2016)

Tam Elidor Series:

1. The Dagger in the Crown (2001, the first Tam Eildor novel)
2. In the Shadow of the Minster (2002)
3. The Gowry Conspiracy (2003)
4. The Stuart Sapphire (2005)
5. Murder at the World's Edge (2021, forthcoming)

Rose McQuinn series:

1. The Inspector's Daughter (2000)
2. Dangerous Pursuits (2002)
3. An Orkney Murder (2003)
4. Ghost Walk (2004)
5. Destroying Angel (2007)
6. Quest for a Killer (2010)
7. Deadly Legacy (2012)
8. The Balmoral Incident (2014)

Annie Kelty Series:

1. The Monster in the Loch (1999, for new readers)
2. The Royal Park Murder (1999, for new readers)
3. Dead Beckoning (1999, for new readers)

Miscellaneous:

- Legend of the Loch (1969)
- The October Witch (1971)
- Castle Clodha (1972)
- Lament for Lost Lovers (1972)
- The White Rose (1973)
- Passionate Kindness (1974, also published as A Violent Passion)
- A Stranger Came By (1974)
- A Drink for the Bridge (1976, also published as The Most Tragic Tay Bridge Disaster)
- The Wicked Wynsleys (1977)
- Girl on an Empty Swing (1978)
- The Black Duchess (1980)
- Castle of Foxes (1981)
- Colla's Children (1982)
- The Clan (1985)
- Estella (1986)
- The Wicked Wynsleys (1990)
- The Sweet Cheat Gone (1992)
- Strathblair (1993)
- This Outward Angel (1993)
- Angel Eyes (1997)
- Faro and the Royals (2005)
- Burke and Hare (2007, non-fiction)
- The Midnight Visitor (2013)
- Miss Havisham's Revenge, Estella's Missing Years (2014)
- The Darkness Within (2017)
- Murder Lies Waiting (2018)
- The Dower House Mystery (2019)

=== Nonfiction ===
- The Private Life of Robert Louis Stevenson (1983, play)
- The Robert Louis Stevenson Treasury (1985)
- R. L. S. in the South Seas: An intimate photographic record (1986, editor)
- Close and Deadly: Chilling Murders in the Heart of Edinburgh (2002, non-fiction)
- 101 Golden Rules for Writing Successful Fiction (2015, professional advice)
- My Psychic Life, Mostly (2018, autobiography)
- My Writing Life, Mostly (2020, autobiography)
