= William McIlvanney =

Scottish novelist, short story writer, and poet (1936–2015)

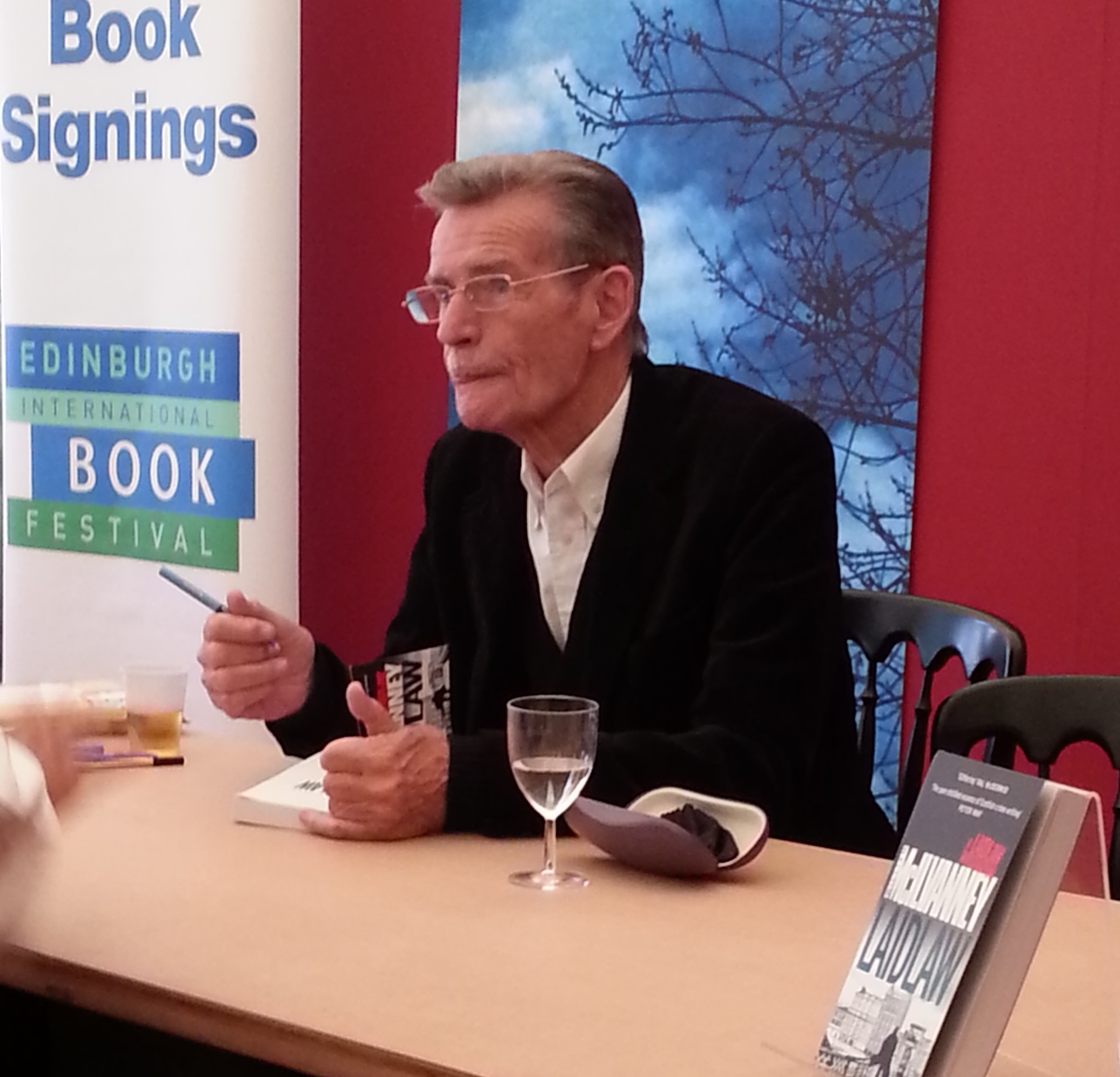
- McIlvanney at the Edinburgh International Book Festival 2013
- Born: William Angus McIlvanney; 25 November 1936; Kilmarnock, Scotland
- Died: 5 December 2015 (aged 79); Glasgow, Scotland
- Education: University of Glasgow
- Relatives: Liam McIlvanney (son), Hugh McIlvanney (brother)
- Writing career
- Period: 1966-2015
- Genre: crime
- Notable works: Docherty (1975), Laidlaw (1977), Strange Loyalties (1991)
- Website: williammcilvanney.com

William Angus McIlvanney (25 November 1936 – 5 December 2015) was a Scottish novelist, short story writer, and poet. He was known as Gus by friends and acquaintances. McIlvanney was a champion of gritty yet poetic literature; his works Laidlaw, The Papers of Tony Veitch, and Walking Wounded are all known for their portrayal of Glasgow in the 1970s. He is regarded as "the father of Tartan Noir" and as Scotland's Camus.

== Biography ==
McIlvanney was born in Kilmarnock on 25 November 1936, the youngest of four children of a former miner, and attended school at Kilmarnock Academy. He went on to study English at the University of Glasgow and graduated with an MA in 1960. McIlvanney then worked as an English teacher until 1975, when he left the position of assistant headmaster at Greenwood Academy to pursue his writing career. The writer's elder brother was the sports journalist Hugh McIlvanney. His son, Liam McIlvanney, is also an author of the crime genre.

In addition to his literary career, McIlvanney wrote regularly for newspapers, and was a writer and narrator of the BBC Scotland football documentary Only a Game? in 1986.

McIlvanney held onto his strong socialist views throughout his life. In common with many from working-class backgrounds in Scotland, he was strongly opposed to Thatcherism. Later, he became disappointed by the shift of Labour towards the centre during the New Labour era under Prime Ministers Tony Blair and Gordon Brown and by 2014, he had ultimately come to hesitantly feel that Scottish independence might be the best political solution.

William McIlvanney died on 5 December 2015 at the age of 79, after a short illness. Following his death, a number of public figures, including SNP MSP Nicola Sturgeon, authors Ian Rankin and Irvine Welsh, paid tribute noting both his inspirational writing and his likeable and gentlemanly personality. The Telegraph obituary noted: "Many authors are admired. Many are respected. Few are loved as he was, for what they are as well as for what they have written."

== Writing ==
His first book, Remedy is None, was published in 1966 and won the Geoffrey Faber Memorial Prize in 1967. Docherty (1975), a portrait of a miner whose courage and endurance is tested during the depression, won the Whitbread Novel Award.

The Big Man (1985) is the story of Dan Scoular, an unemployed man who turns to bare-knuckle fighting to make a living. Both novels feature typical McIlvanney characters – tough, often violent, men locked in a struggle with their own nature and background. The novel was adapted into a film in 1990 directed by David Leland, starring Liam Neeson, and featuring Billy Connolly.

His novel, The Kiln (1996), is the story of Tam Docherty, the grandson of the hero of Docherty. It won the Saltire Society Scottish Book of the Year Award.

Laidlaw (1977), The Papers of Tony Veitch (1983) and Strange Loyalties (1991) are crime novels featuring Inspector Jack Laidlaw. Laidlaw is considered to have "effectively created the genre now stereotypically referred to as Tartan Noir", although McIlvaney called the term "ersatz".

McIlvanney was also a poet, and wrote The Longships in Harbour: Poems (1970), In Through the Head (1988) and Surviving the Shipwreck (1991), which also contains pieces of journalism, including an essay about T. S. Eliot. McIlvanney wrote a screenplay based on his short story "Dreaming" (published in Walking Wounded in 1989) which was filmed by BBC Scotland in 1990 and won a BAFTA.

From April 2013, McIlvanney's writing was regularly published on his own website, which features personal, reflective and topical writing, as well as examples of his journalism.

His final novel, The Dark Remains, was completed by Ian Rankin and released in September 2021.

The McIlvanney Prize, awarded by Bloody Scotland, is named after him.

== Reviews ==
- Gifford, Douglas (1976), review of Docherty, in Burnett, Ray (ed.), Calgagus No. 3, pp. 58 & 59, ISSN 0307-2029
- Aitchison, James (1983), review of The Papers of Tony Veitch, in Lindsay, Maurice (ed.), The Scottish Review: Arts and Environment 31, August 1983, pp. 60 – 62, ISSN 0140-0894

== Prizes and awards ==
- 1967 Geoffrey Faber Memorial Prize for Remedy is None
- 1968 Scottish Arts Council Book Award for A Gift from Nessus
- 1975 Scottish Arts Council Book Award for Docherty
- 1975 Whitbread Award, for Best Novel for Docherty
- 1977 Crime Writers' Association Macallan Silver Dagger for Fiction for Laidlaw
- 1983 Crime Writers' Association Macallan Silver Dagger for Fiction for The Papers of Tony Veitch
- 1990 Glasgow Herald People's Prize for Walking Wounded
- 1990 BAFTA (screen adaptation): "Dreaming"
- 1992 Glasgow Herald People's Prize for Strange Loyalties
- 1992 Scottish Arts Council awards for Surviving the Shipwreck and Strange Loyalties
- 1996 Saltire Society Scottish Book of the Year Award for The Kiln
- 2013 Saltire Society Fletcher of Saltoun Award 2013 for "outstanding contribution to Scotland's life and culture"
- 2013 Glenfiddich Spirit of Scotland Award for writing
- 2016 University of Glasgow posthumously awarded him with an honorary doctorate.
