= Malcolm Mackay (writer) =

Scottish crime writer

Malcolm Mackay (born 1 September 1981, Stornoway on the Isle of Lewis, Scotland) is a Scottish crime writer. In 2013 he won the Deanston Scottish Crime Book of the Year for his novel How a Gunman Says Goodbye.

== Publications ==
=== Novels ===
- The Glasgow Trilogy
  - The Necessary Death of Lewis Winter (2013)
  - How A Gunman Says Goodbye (2013)
  - The Sudden Arrival of Violence (2014)
- Darian Ross Novels
  - In the Cage Where Your Saviours Hide (2018)
  - A Line of Forgotten Blood (2019)
- Stand-Alone Novels
- The Night the Rich Men Burned (2014)
- Every Night I Dream of Hell (2015)
- For Those Who Know the Ending (2016)

=== Short stories ===
- Anatomy of a Hit (2013)
