= Tartan Noir =

Scottish crime fiction genre

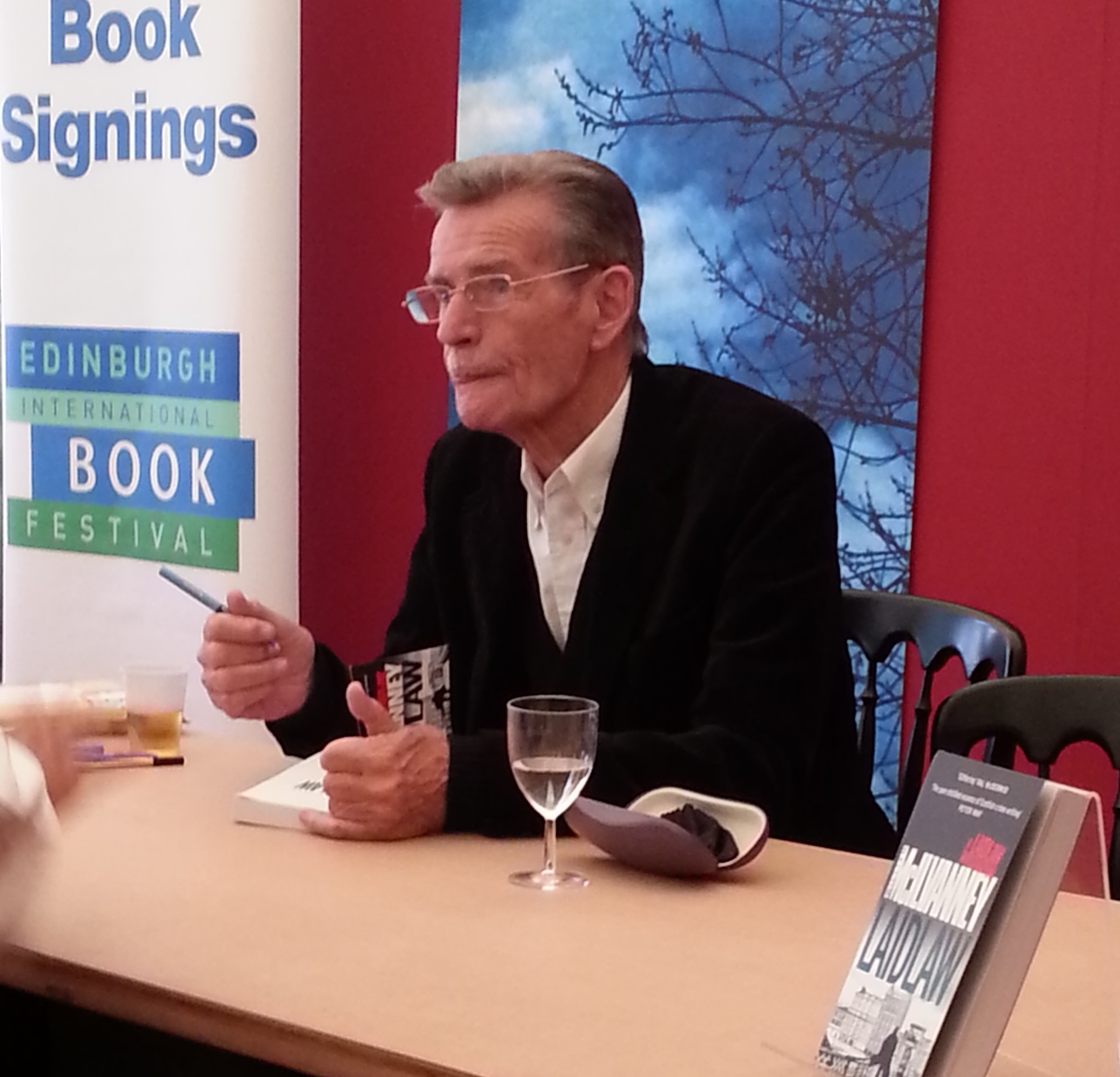
William McIlvanney, the father of the genre

Tartan Noir is a form of crime fiction particular to Scotland and Scottish writers. William McIlvanney, who wrote three crime novels, the first being Laidlaw in 1977, is considered the father of the genre.

== Criticism ==
William McIlvanney (whose own work has been considered a precursor to Tartan Noir) has said that the whole genre is "ersatz". Charles Taylor has stated that the term has an "inescapably condescending tinge", noting "it's a touristy phrase, suggesting that there's something quaint about hard-boiled crime fiction that comes from the land of kilts and haggis".

== Tartan Noir writers ==
- Lin Anderson
- Christopher Brookmyre
- Quintin Jardine
- Stuart MacBride
- Peter May
- Val McDermid
- William McIlvanney
- William H S McIntyre
- Denise Mina
- Caro Ramsay
- Sir Ian Rankin

== See also ==
- Nordic noir
