= Hugh McIlvanney =

Scottish sports journalist (1934–2019)

Hugh McIlvanney OBE
- Portrait by Jane Brown, 1997
- Born: Hugh Montgomery McIlvanney; 2 February 1934; Kilmarnock, Ayrshire, Scotland
- Died: 24 January 2019 (aged 84); London, England
- Occupation: Sports journalist
- Spouses: Sarah Agnew Kenmuir (m. 1958, divorced) Sophie (divorced); Caroline North (m. 2014)
- Children: 2
- Relatives: William McIlvanney (brother)

Hugh McIlvanney OBE (2 February 1934 – 24 January 2019) was a Scottish sports journalist who had long stints with the British Sunday newspapers The Observer (30 years until 1993) and then 23 years with The Sunday Times (1993–2016). After nearly six decades in the profession, he retired in March 2016 at the age of 82.

== Early life ==
McIlvanney was born on 2 February 1934 in Kilmarnock, Ayrshire, Scotland, to William and Helen McIlvanney (née Montgomery). He had one sister and two brothers, including the novelist and crime fiction writer William McIlvanney.

He was educated at Hillhead Primary school then James Hamilton Academy. He transferred across to Kilmarnock Academy for a session when his brother William started there.

== Journalism career ==
McIlvanney left school to work as a reporter at The Kilmarnock Standard. He moved on to the Scottish Daily Express. In his mid-twenties, while he was working at The Scotsman, he was persuaded to write about sport. He joined The Observer in 1962 as an assistant sports editor and worked at the paper until 1993, interrupted when he took a news and features role in 1972–73 with the Daily Express, before joining The Sunday Times in 1993. His column on the back page of The Sunday Times sports section ran until 2016.

His writing has been described as striving for perfection – with much attention paid to the detail. Any expression of joy for the writing he submitted was deferred until he had seen what had actually been printed. He was not shy in offering his analysis of sports stars. In 1974, immediately after The Rumble in the Jungle, he made an approach to Muhammad Ali and was granted a two-hour interview. In September 1980 he reported from Los Angeles on the professional fight where Johnny Owen was defeated and knocked unconscious.

In The Football Men, he examined the life and careers of three great modern Scottish football managers – Matt Busby, Jock Stein and Bill Shankly for the BBC television programme Arena. This used BBC archive footage, and aired in 1997 as a three-part series.

He retired at the age of 82, having said that the physical demands of the job had become too taxing.

== Honours ==
In the 1996 Birthday Honours, McIlvanney was made an Officer of the Order of the British Empire (OBE) for services to Sports Journalism. He was given the Lifetime Achievement Award 2004 by the Scottish Press Awards. He is the only sports writer to be voted Journalist of the Year at the British Press Awards. In 2005, he was included in the Press Gazette Hall of Fame. He was named British sports writer of the year seven times.

In 2007, the Variety Club of Great Britain and the London Press Club presented him with the Edgar Wallace Award for Fine Writing. In December 2008 he was voted into the International Boxing Hall of Fame, and he was inducted in 2009. In 2009 he was bestowed with an honorary degree from Leicester's De Montfort University In 2011 he was inducted into the Scottish Football Hall of Fame, located at the Scottish Football Museum. In October 2017, the National Football Museum inducted him into the English Football Hall of Fame – the first football writer to be honoured in this way. In 2017, at the British Sports Book Awards he was named for an Outstanding Contribution to Sports Writing.

== Personal life ==
He married three times and had one son, Conn, and a daughter, Elizabeth. His first two marriages ended in divorce; his third marriage, to Caroline Joy North, lasted from 2014 until his death, on 24 January 2019, at his home in Richmond, London. Paying tribute to McIlvanney, The Press and Journal described him as "a giant with a genius for transforming sport into literature" and said his voice was "akin to Humphrey Bogart's in The Big Sleep; a gravelly drawl of dry-as-Nevada humour interspersed with a man's-gotta-do cynicism." On 25 January 2019 McIlvanney was featured on the BBC Radio 4 programme Last Word.

== Works ==
- On Boxing. Mainstream. 1982. ISBN 1-84018-005-6.
- On Football. Mainstream. 1994. ISBN 1-84018-007-2.
- On Horseracing. (co-written with Peter O'Sullevan). Mainstream. 1995. ISBN 1-84018-006-4.
- Managing My Life. (co-written with Alex Ferguson). Hodder. 1999. ISBN 978-0-340-72856-7.
