= New Farm Loch =

Village in East Ayrshire, Scotland

Coordinates: 55°37′01″N 4°28′23″W

New Farm Loch: Scottish Gaelic: Loch Tuathanais Ùr
- Suburb
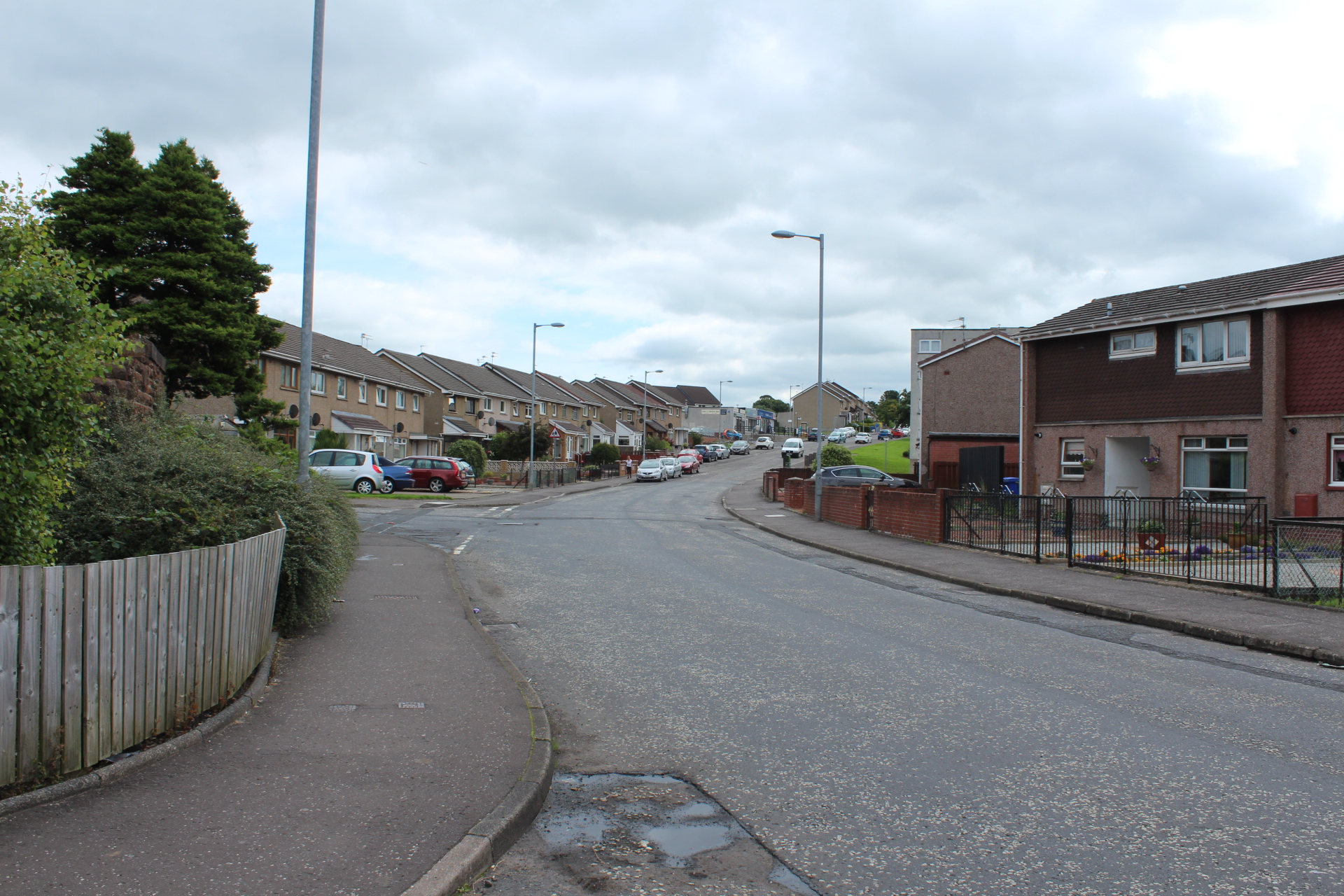
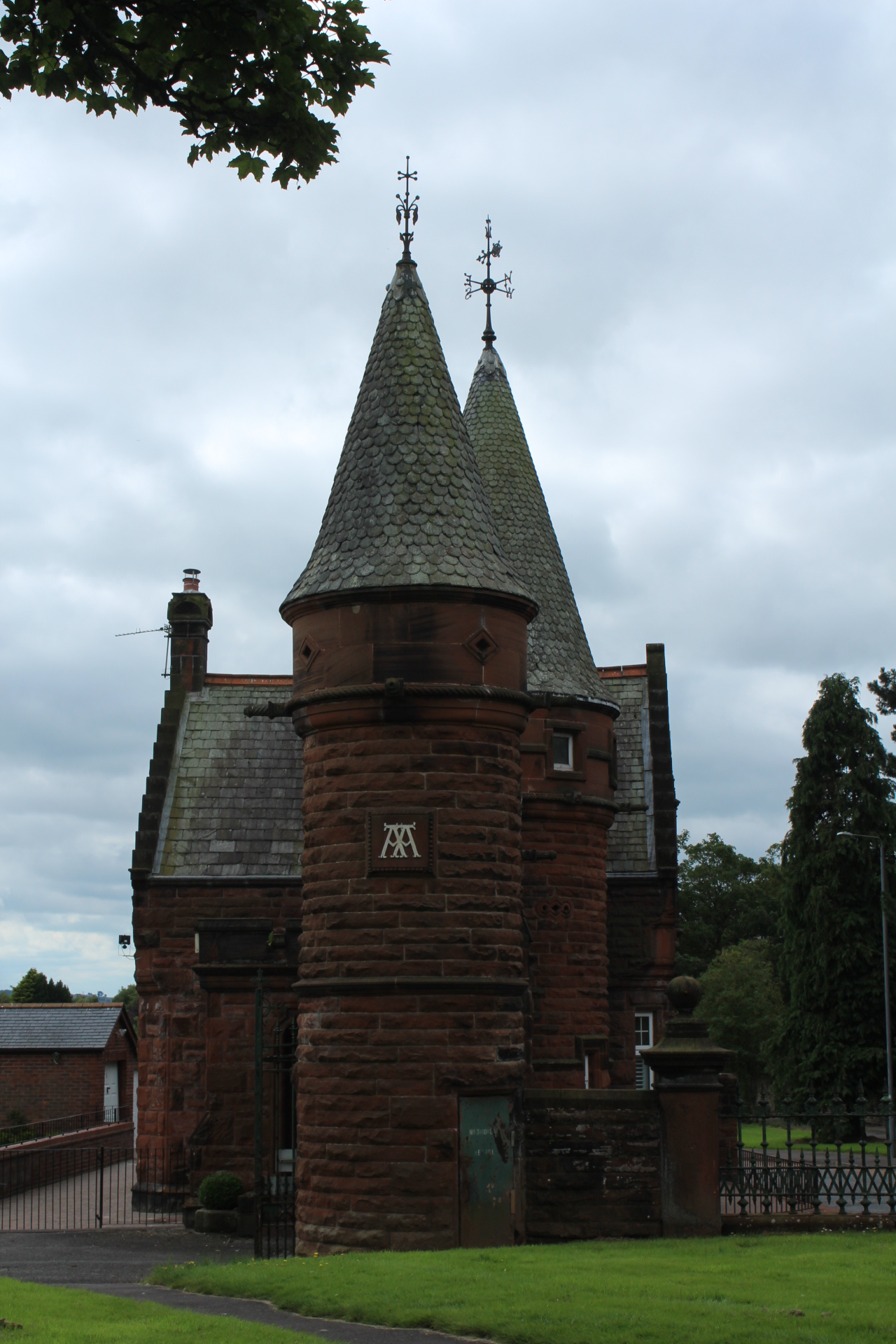
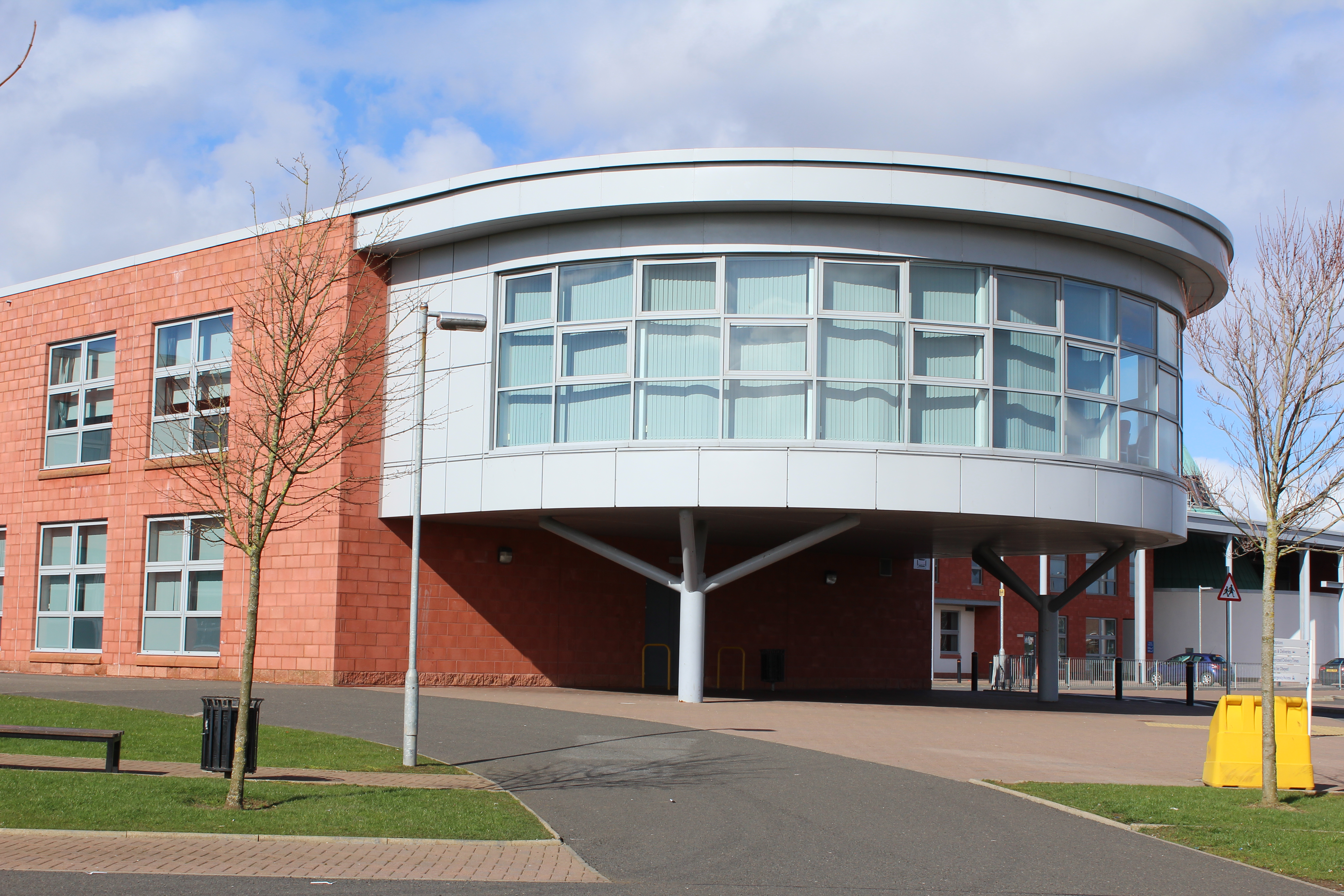
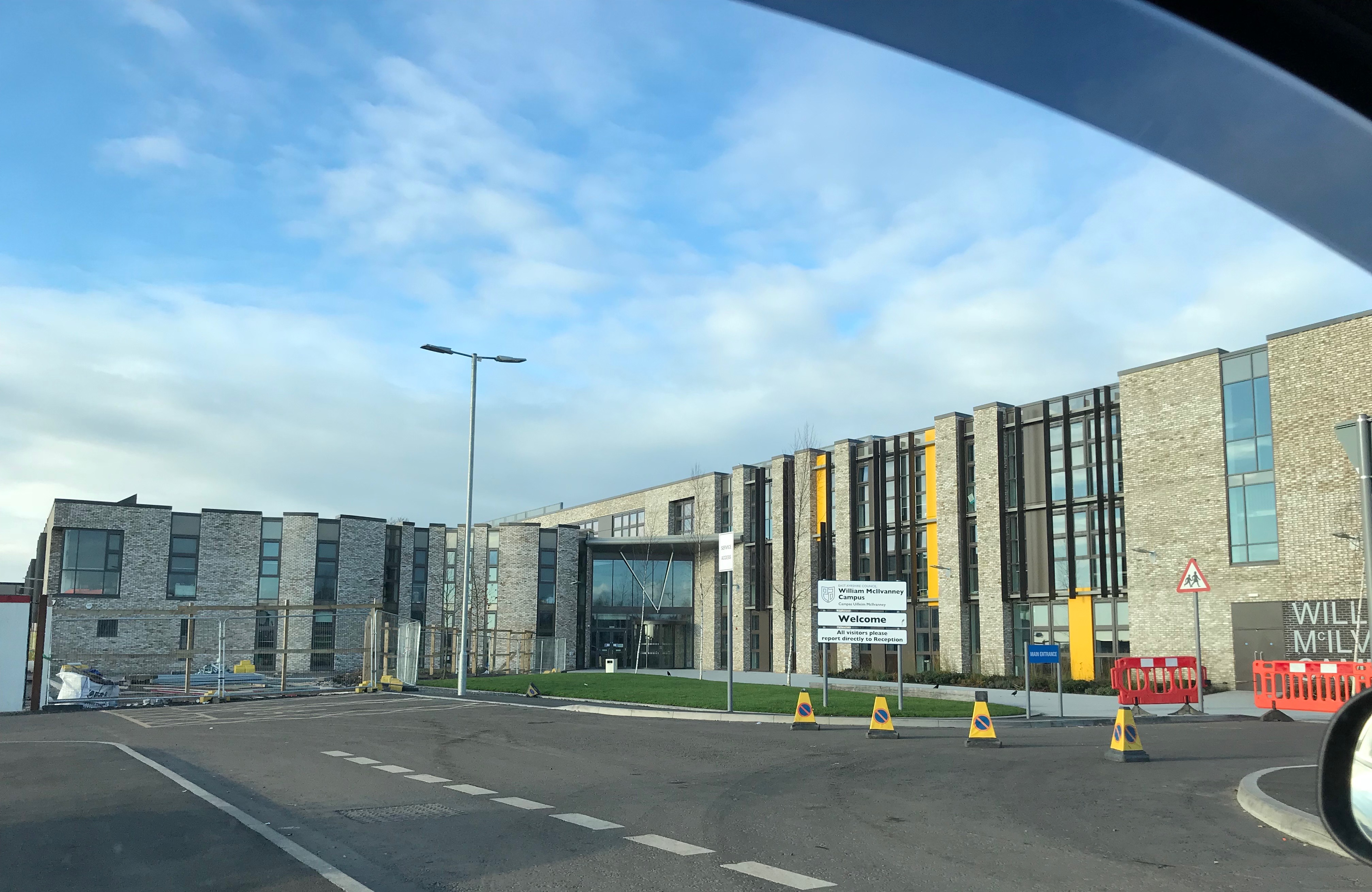
- From top, left to right: Macphail Drive, West Lodge, St Joseph's Academy, Kilmarnock Academy

- Location within East Ayrshire
  - Edinburgh: 56 mi (90 km)
  - London: 335 mi (539 km)
- Council area: East Ayrshire
- Lieutenancy area: Ayrshire and Arran
- Country: Scotland
- Sovereign state: United Kingdom
- Post town: KILMARNOCK
- Postcode district: KA3
- Dialling code: 01563
- Police: Scotland
- Fire: Scottish
- Ambulance: Scottish
- UK Parliament: Kilmarnock and Loudoun
- Scottish Parliament: Kilmarnock and Irvine Valley
- Website: East Ayrshire Council

New Farm Loch (Scottish Gaelic: Loch Tuathanais Ùr) is a suburb to the North-East of Kilmarnock, East Ayrshire, Scotland and was created in the late 1960s by a number of builders to accommodate the growing population of Kilmarnock.

New Farm Loch officially opened in 1968 with the first houses occupied by residents at MacDonald Drive, MacKenzie Drive, MacKinnon Drive, MacLeod Place, MacNab Place, MacPhail Drive, MacNaughton Drive and MacNeil Place.

== History ==
=== The New Farm Loch ===
The loch was constructed there by co-operation between the Duke of Portland's factor and the local curling clubs. Newfarm Loch, which was once popular as a curling rink, was rented by several curling clubs,

The loch site is still bordered by mature trees planted to provide shelter for the curlers. It is however surrounded on three sides by houses and apartments built between 1968 and the mid-1970s. New Farm itself no longer exists; it stood about one field's distance away from the loch.

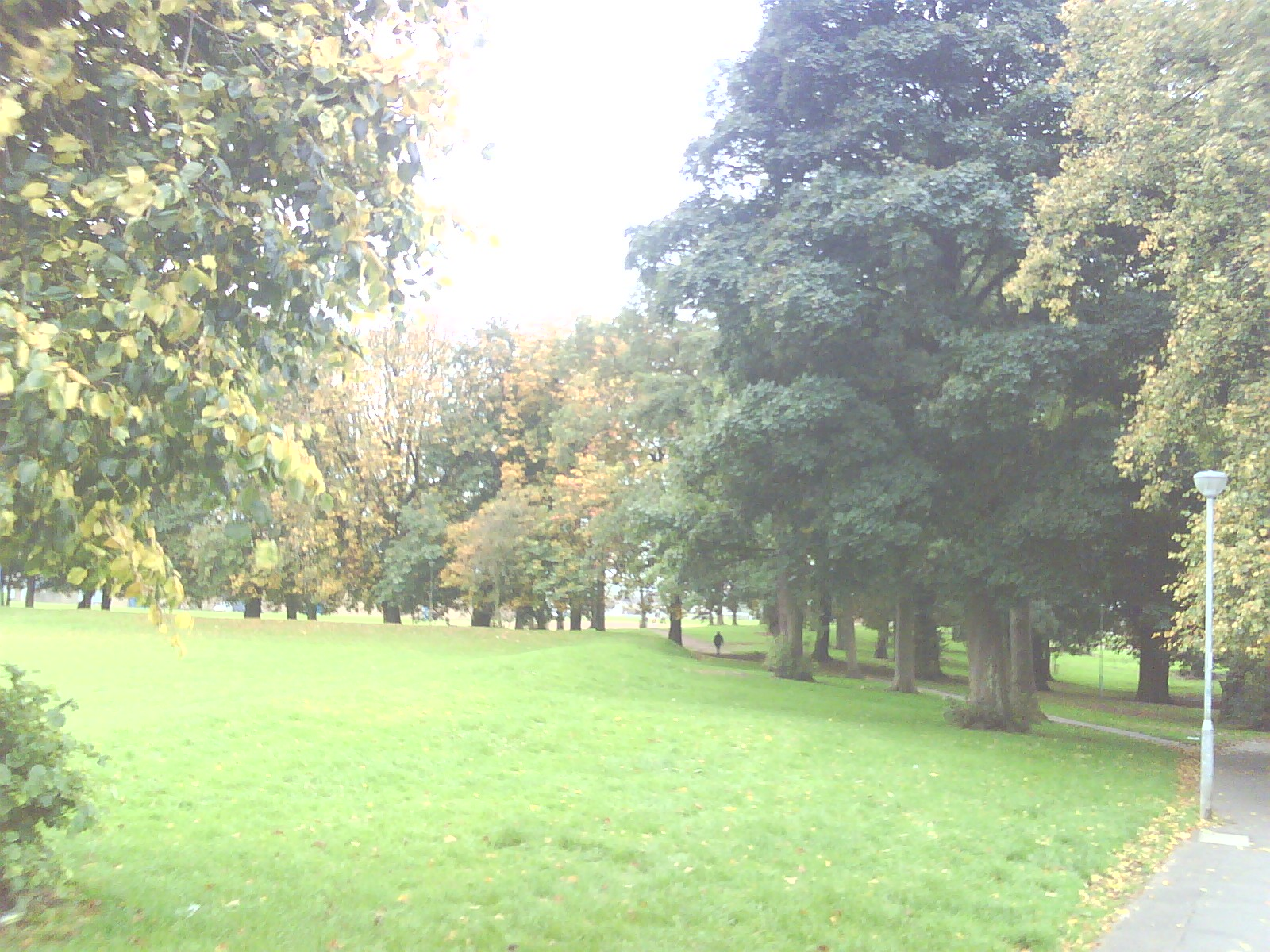
A nice Autumnal view of some of the trees around the Loch

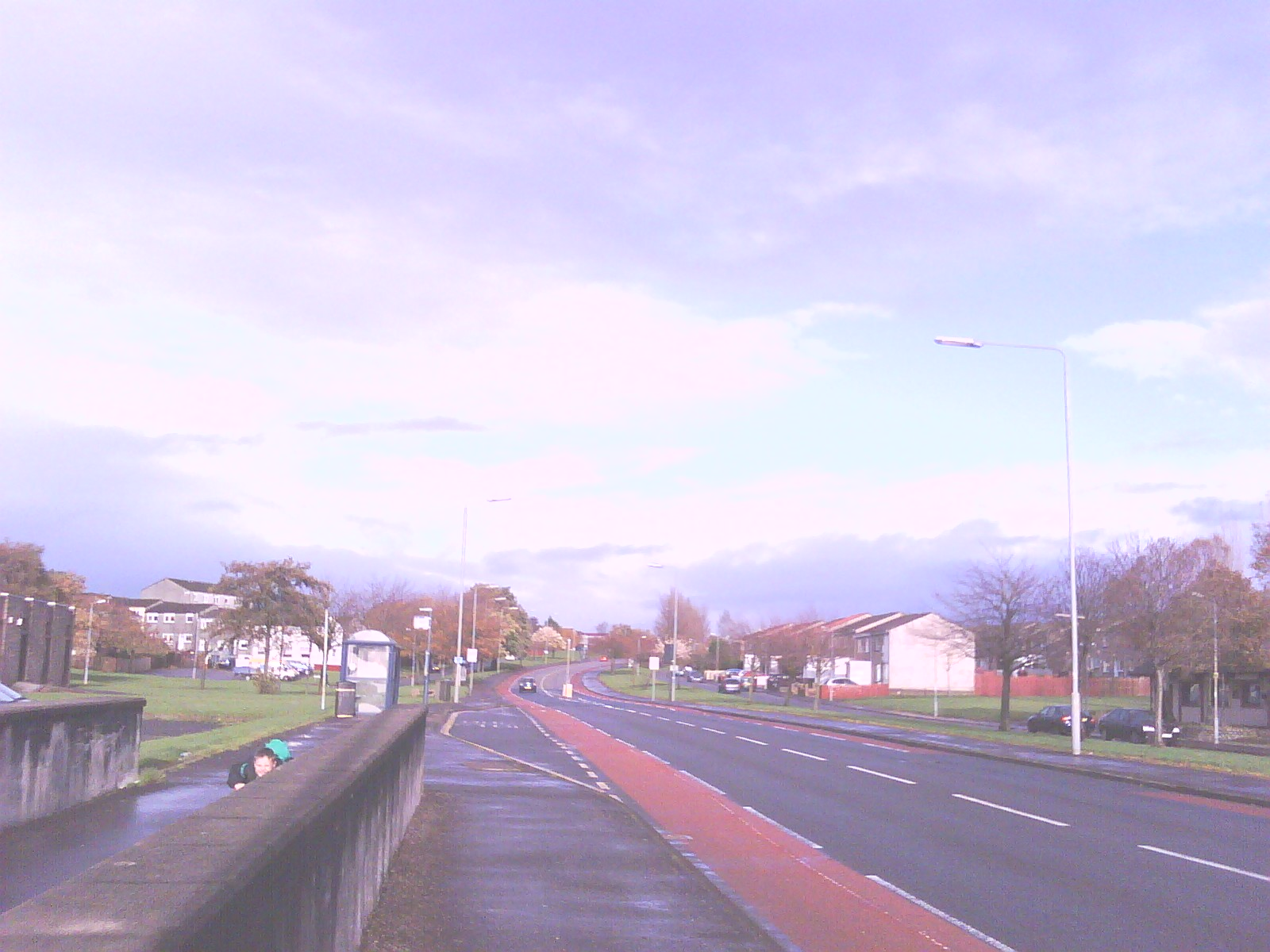
Looking up Grassyards Road

Prior to being built up, New Farm Loch on the north east side of Kilmarnock was prone to seasonal flooding. In winter, when the water froze over, it was used as a curling rink. As well as curling, the frozen pond at New Farm Loch in Kilmarnock was popular with skaters.

=== The Estate ===
The estate was built on the lands of South Dean Farm, Newfarm, and parts of Whinpark Farm and West Wardlaw Farm. The latter two still survive, and South Dean Farm is retained in the name of South Dean Road, along which it sat. The working class estate is a warren of streets, split by a central carriageway named Grassyards Road. One side of the road is known locally as 'The Courts'. New Farm Loch was built by Scottish Special Housing.

== Demographics ==
=== Education ===
New Farm had, until April 2018, 3 primary schools, namely Silverwood Primary, St. Andrews Primary (connected with St. Josephs Academy) and New Farm Primary (connected with James Hamilton Academy). New Farm and Silverwood Primaries have merged to become James Hamilton Primary whilst the Gaelic School previously based at Onthank Primary has now relocated to New Farm Loch.

Until 2018 there were two secondary schools in New Farm Loch the James Hamilton Academy and the town's only Roman Catholic Secondary School, St Joseph's Academy, which was re-built in 2008. In April 2018 James Hamilton Academy merged with nearby Kilmarnock Academy and is housed in the new William McIlvanney Campus along with James Hamilton Primary and the Gaelic School, Kilmarnock Academy is now the non-denominational Secondary School within New Farm Loch.

East Ayrshire Council approved plans for the merger of James Hamilton Academy with Kilmarnock Academy to create a new secondary school and the merger of New Farm Primary School and Early Childhood Centre with Silverwood Primary School to create a new primary school with Early Childhood Centre, which will be co-located on a 3-18 campus on the existing Sutherland Drive site. The completion of this project was in 2018. New Farm Loch also contains Willowbank School, which caters for primary and secondary children with a range of severe, complex and profound additional support needs.

=== Transport ===
The area is located about two miles North and East from Kilmarnock town centre which contains the town's Bus and Train stations. The Number 5,6 and 7 Stagecoach Bus services are frequent, looping around New Farm Loch (with the exception of the 5) and back to the town centre. There is also a Glasgow commuter service passing along Grassyards Road and onto the A77, located on the outskirts of the area.

=== Retail ===
The village has numerous shops and businesses, one of which is local convenience store KeyStore.
