= Hugh Anderson =

Hugh Anderson may refer to:

- Hugh Anderson (cowboy) (1851–1873 or 1914), American cowboy and gunfighter
- Hugh Alan Anderson (1933–2015), Canadian politician
- Hugh C. Anderson (1851–1915), American politician
- Hugh Anderson (motorcyclist) (born 1936), former Grand Prix motorcycle racing World Champion from New Zealand
- Hugh J. Anderson (1801–1881), American politician
- Hugh Anderson (British politician) (1867–1933), Irish Unionist politician
- Hugh Abercrombie Anderson (1890–1965), Canadian writer
- Hugh Kerr Anderson (1865–1928), British physiologist and educator
- Hugh Anderson (theologian) (1920–2003), Scottish theologian
