= Kilmarnock Academy =

School in East Ayrshire, Scotland

Kilmarnock Academy Acadamaidh Chille Mheàrnaig
- Current badge (2018–)

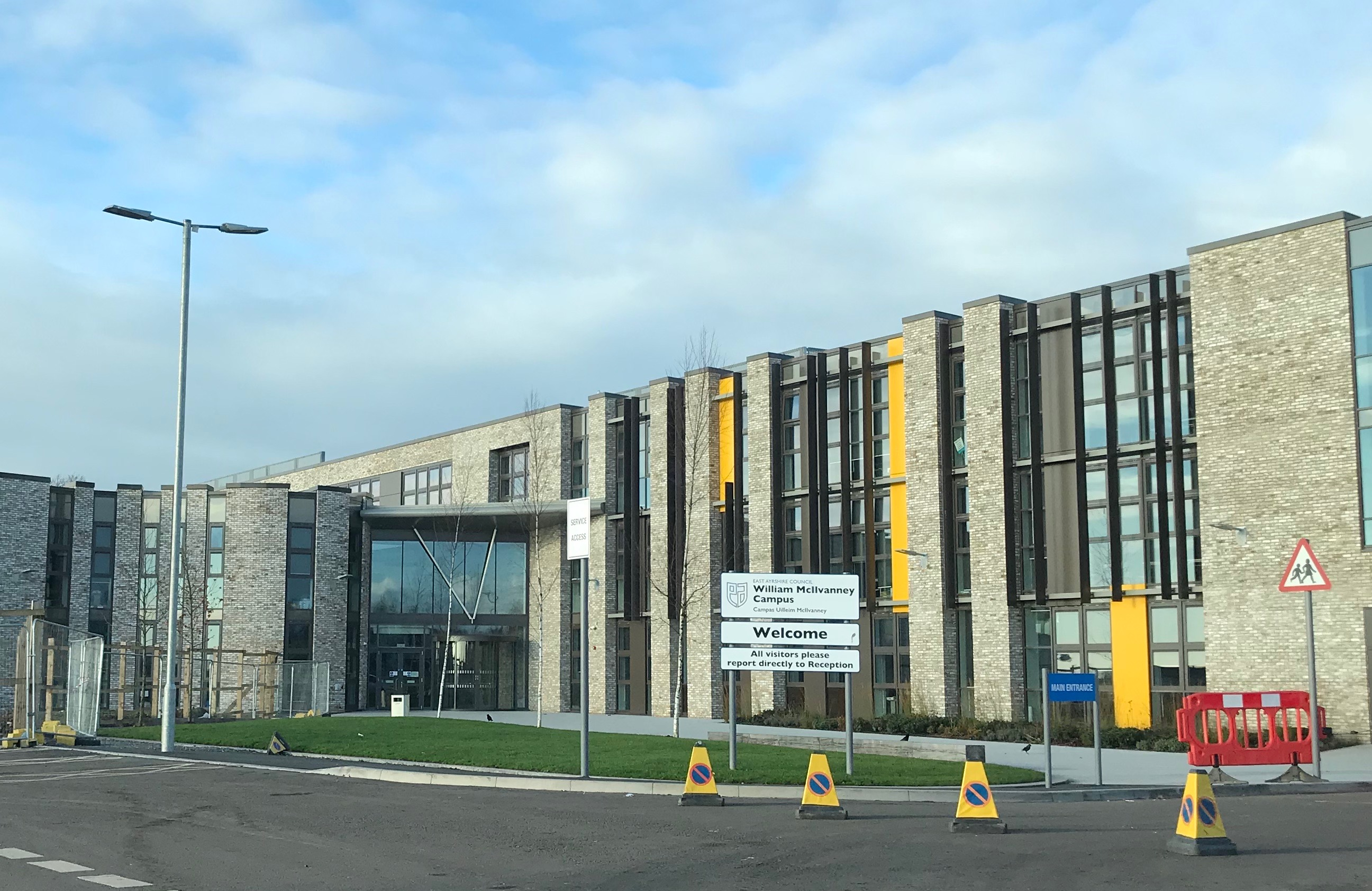
- New building on Sutherland Drive, 2018–present

Location
- Sutherland Drive; Kilmarnock, East Ayrshire, KA3 7DF; Scotland; 55.6153°N 4.4729°W

Information
- Type: 11–17 co-educational state-funded secondary school
- Motto: Aspire Together, Achieve Together (2018–); Do Justly, Love Mercy, Walk Humbly (1898–2018)
- Established: c. 1630; 396 years ago (as Kilmarnock Burgh School)
- Founder: Kilmarnock Burgh Council
- Local authority: East Ayrshire Council
- Head Teacher: David Rose (2015–present)
- Staff: 148 Teaching and non-teaching
- Gender: Boys and girls
- Age: 11 to 17
- Enrolment: 1,357
- Houses: Fleming, Burns, Orr, Wallace
- Colour
- Publication: The Goldberry, 1888–1954, 2018
- Affiliated schools: James Hamilton, Loanhead, Whatriggs and Onthank primary schools
- Blog: Kilmarnock Academy Blog

Kilmarnock Academy (Scottish Gaelic: Acadamaidh Chille Mheàrnaig), formerly Kilmarnock Burgh School, is an 11–17 co-educational secondary school in Kilmarnock, Scotland, currently serving in its fourth location on Sutherland Drive in the New Farm Loch area of the town. Previous sites for Kilmarnock Academy include College Wynd, erected during the 1680s–1690s, Green Street, erected in 1752, and Elmbank Drive, erected in 1898.

The school can be traced back to the 1630s when it was established by the Kilmarnock Burgh Council as 'Kilmarnock Burgh School', making it one of the oldest schools in the United Kingdom and Scotland. The current head teacher is David Rose who was appointed in June 2015 on an acting basis, and was made permanent Head Teacher of Kilmarnock Academy (the newly formed school following merger with James Hamilton Academy) in April 2017.

Kilmarnock Academy is one of a few schools in the UK, and the first school in Scotland, to have educated several Nobel laureates: Alexander Fleming, discoverer of penicillin, and John Boyd Orr, 1st Baron Boyd-Orr, for his scientific research into nutrition and his work as the first Director-General of the United Nations Food and Agriculture Organization (FAO).

== History ==
From 1945, it was a state co-educational grammar school. It became a comprehensive school in 1968, fees having been abolished for pupils attending Kilmarnock Academy in 1945 following World War II. In 1997 Kilmarnock Academy appointed its first woman Head Teacher, Carole Ford, who served in the position from 1997–2011.

At one point, Kilmarnock Academy had provided both primary and secondary education on a fee-paying basis to Kilmarnock's school children.

=== Origins and Green Street (1630s–1876) ===
Kilmarnock Academy can trace its history back to the local burgh school founded in the 1630s and the first school to bear the name was established in 1807. A Kilmarnock Academy operated from Green Street in Kilmarnock, before being relocated to Elmbank Drive to accommodate increased demand for places at the school. The first mention of a town schoolmaster in Kilmarnock came before the Scottish Parliamentary legislation which was passed in 1633 which required there to be a school in every parish in Scotland. In the early records published in 1629, there is mention of John Andersoune as the schoolmaster of Kilmarnock. Andersoune had died that year, however, the first relative clear indication of a burgh school having been established in Kilmarnock in the late sixteenth century is from the notable education Zachary Boyd. It is speculated that Kilmarnock Burgh School was situated in College Wynd in the town centre of Kilmarnock, just off Bank Street. The parish school was situated in College Wynd, behind the Laigh Kirk. The Parish School was a single-teacher school and was speculated to have been a grammar school which provide potential university entrants with the necessary skills in Latin in order to obtain a place at university. James Smith was appointed schoolmaster in 1736 which resulted in the teaching duties being split between two teachers, one which was based in the grammar (or parish) school, and the other in the newly-founded burgh school.

John Graham was the schoolmaster in the grammar school from 1763–1779. He later moved to London and was eventually hanged as result of participating in a money forgery scheme. John Duncan succeed Graham as schoolmaster and served from 1779–1797, and was credited as being the first known rector of the grammar school. William Thomson, who was appointed in 1797 as schoolmaster, was the first rector of renamed school, Kilmarnock Academy. In 1898, the school officially moved from Green Street to Elmbank Drive.

=== North Hamilton Street (1876–1898) ===
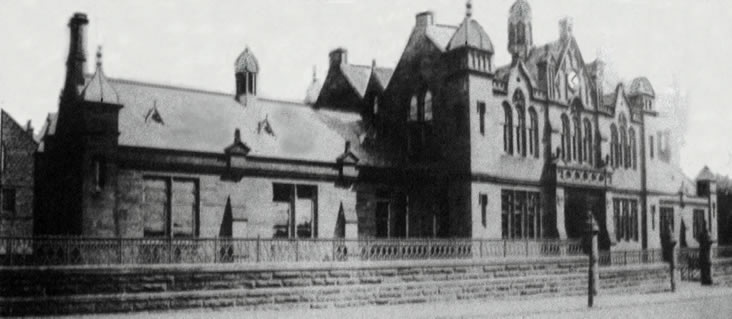
Kilmarnock Burgh School on North Hamilton Street during the 1870s

A new replacement Kilmarnock Academy opened on North Hamilton Street in August 1876, replacing the former Kilmarnock Academy on Green Street. The foundation stone for the new Kilmarnock Academy was laid on 20 November 1875, with the building designed by William Railton. The North Hamilton Street building cost £4,500 to build and was constructed by Andrew Calderwood, a local builder within Kilmarnock.

When the school opened at North Hamilton Street, it had 426 pupils enrolled and contained a School of Science and Art. The first headmaster of Kilmarnock Academy at North Hamilton Street was Hugh Dickie. The North Hamilton Street Kilmarnock Academy was where two Nobel laureates were educated – Alexander Fleming, discoverer of penicillin, and John Boyd Orr, 1st Baron Boyd-Orr, for his scientific research into nutrition and his work as the first Director-General of the United Nations Food and Agriculture Organization (FAO).

The building at North Hamilton Street soon became cramped and could not accommodate the increased number of pupils wishing to attend the school, leading to a newer building being constructed at Elmbank Drive which was erected in 1898, with pupils transferring from North Hamilton Street to the new Elmbank Drive Kilmarnock Academy in 1898. The North Hamilton Street site subsequently housed Grange Primary and a Junior Secondary school and later Woodstock School and more recently Flowerbank Early Childhood Centre.

=== Elmbank Drive (1898–2018) ===
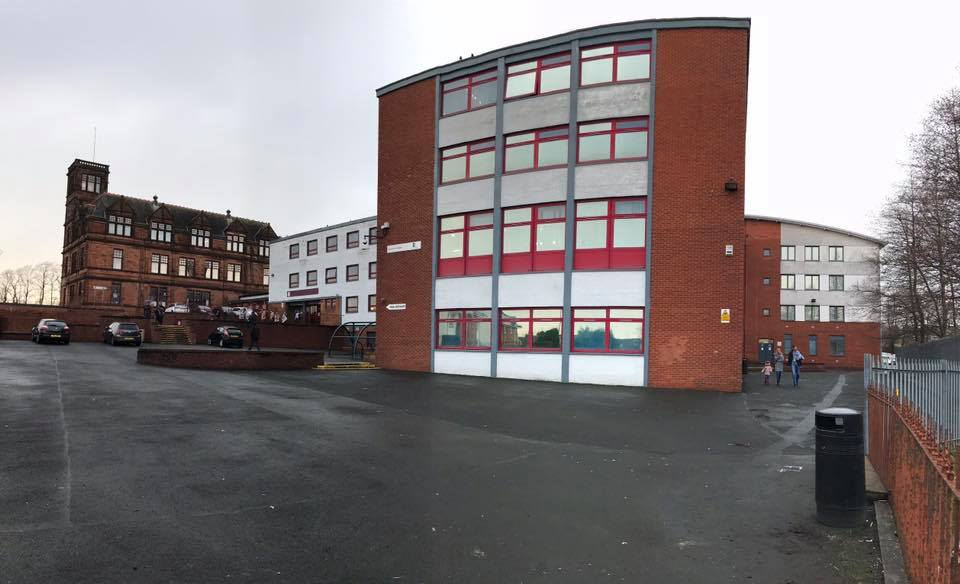
Elmbank Drive; The Original Building (left), "New Building" (1968–69, centre), new Technology Block (1997, right)

The Kilmarnock Academy that was situated on Elmbank Drive was erected in 1898 to plans by Robert Ingram. The Elmbank Drive site was originally land that contained a nursery, with two acres of the site being used as the nursery playground. The foundation stone for the new Kilmarnock Academy at Elmbank Drive was laid on 31 October 1896. Built of traditional red sandstone, the new Kilmarnock Academy contained a gym, swimming pool and workshops, in addition to the usual classrooms. The first headmaster of Kilmarnock Academy at Elmbank Drive was Dr. Hugh Dickie who previously served as the headmaster of the school at the former site on North Hamilton Street. On 24 March 1923, a war memorial was dedicated by Sir Charles Fergusson, and was designed by former pupil of the school and architect W.F. Valentine. To commemorate the loss of soldiers in World War II, a library was opened in the school in 1955.

A public clock was erected at the top of the building, facing towards the town centre, with a tall 80 ft square tower which was originally used for astronomy lessons. The new building could accommodate 868 pupils over the ground and second floor, with the third floor housing cookery classrooms, a lecture room and a chemical laboratory. Costing £22,000 to build, the new building had a total of 22 classrooms and opened to pupils and staff on 9 February 1899 by Sir Robert Murdoch Smith.

The former school badge which was used at Elmbank Drive until 2018

Due to population growth in Kilmarnock, the Elmbank Drive site had to be expanded a number of times. A new dining block was built in 1946, and a new "main building" was constructed between 1964–1971. In 1997, a new technology block was constructed. The newly constructed main building of the Elmbank Drive site cost taxpayers £1 million, and was said to ensure " Kilmarnock will have a very fine modern school with a proud history stretching back many centuries". The main assembly hall in the new building and the dining hall lay between the new building and the existing building, connecting both buildings by a link corridor which bypassed the dining hall. The assembly hall was designed to seat 1400 people and consisted of a fully equipped stage for performances, as well as a projection room.

Phase Three of the building was set to include the modernisation of the Technical Building. It was projected that an all-weather games hall would be constructed and the Technical Building to be connected to the new building of Kilmarnock Academy by constructing a corridor supported by pillars. The proposed corridor would have meant the new block would be at second-floor level, and in order to join the corridor, the demolition of D8 and the metalwork room was considered to be necessary. Phase 3 of the project was estimated to have been finished in 1971, however, the phase was eventually shelved and the Kilmarnock Academy complex remained separated from the Technical Building. Throughout 1996–1998, the school roll was decreased by the educational authority to allow the commencement of a £2.5 programme of refurbishment work to bring the school up to an adequate standard for 21st century learning and teaching.

The Elmbank Drive site closed to pupils and staff on 29 March 2018 when Kilmarnock Academy and James Hamilton Academy merged together to create one school, with the new merged school retained the Kilmarnock Academy name. In 2019, the Elmbank Drive site and buildings were acquired by Kilmarnock based arts academy, CentreStage.

==== Technical College ====
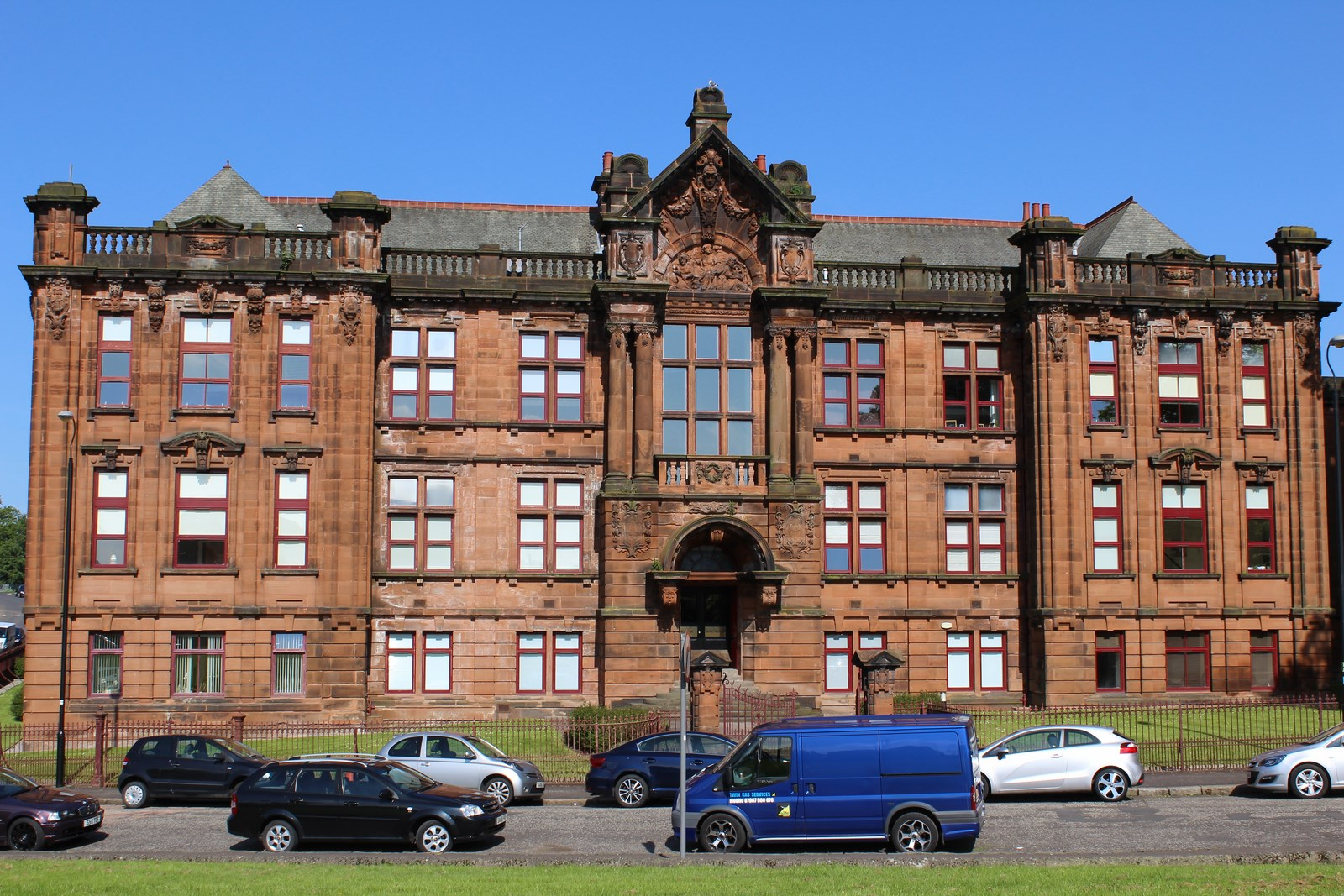
The Technical College closed in 1997, later became luxury apartments, known as "Academy Apartments"

The Technical School, as it was originally known, was built at the corner of Elmbank Drive between 1908–1909, next to Kilmarnock Academy. Constructed of Ballochmyle sandstone, the building was erected to plans by Gabriel Andrew and cost £18,000 to build, opening on 26 January 1910. The technical school contained laboratories "for the study of chemistry, physics, mechanics, high engineering, heavy engineering, electrical engineering, hydraulics, mining, weaving, horticulture, and biology". Additionally, pupils could study building design, art, domestic science, woodwork, metalwork and plumbing at the site.

When opened, the Technical School came under the remit of the rector of Kilmarnock Academy, however, was later separated from the academy and became its own separate entity, becoming known as the Technical College. The technical college later became part of Kilmarnock Academy again, however, in 1997, it was closed following the rearrangement of pupil catchment areas affecting Kilmarnock Academy, meaning there was no longer a requirement for the technical college.

=== Proposals for merger (2013–2018) ===
In 2013, East Ayrshire Council launched a consultation report on the future of the education provision at a number of primary and secondary schools in the Kilmarnock area, including James Hamilton Academy, New Farm Primary School, New Farm Early Childhood Centre and Silverwood Primary School. This report put forward the case for educational provision at the schools coming to an end in term 2016/2017 (however, as of January 2017, this has run over time and projected now for 2018 completion), and the named educational establishments merge into one campus. This would lead to the creation of a "superschool", merging James Hamilton Academy and Kilmarnock Academy together, as well as New Farm Primary, New Farm Early Childhood Centre and Silverwood Primary together. In 2016, the decision was made to house these schools on the newly formed William Mcilvanney campus, named after the late William McIlvanney who was born in Kilmarnock and best-selling crime author. The secondary provision will remain as Kilmarnock Academy, whilst the primary provision is renamed as James Hamilton Primary and Early Childhood Centre.

On 12 October 2016, Deputy First Minister of Scotland in his capacity of Cabinet Secretary for Education and Skills, John Swinney, visited the site of the construction for the new school where he laid the foundation stone for the new structure. Pupils from each of the schools involved in the merger – Kilmarnock Academy, James Hamilton Academy, Silverwood Primary School and New Farm Primary School, choose items to bury in a time capsule underneath the structure of the new school.

==== Sutherland Drive (2018–present) ====
The William McIllvanney Campus, containing Kilmarnock Academy, James Hamilton Primary School and Early Childhood Centre and a Gaelic education unit, was handed over to East Ayrshire Council from Keir Construction on 30 March 2018. The former Kilmarnock Academy and James Hamilton Academy both closed their doors to pupils on Tuesday 27 March 2018 and officially closed on 29 March 2018 after staff had decanted both buildings of furniture and resources. The new Kilmarnock Academy opened to pupils on Wednesday 18 April 2018.

In March 2018, it was announced by both East Ayrshire Council and Centrestage Communities Ltd. that as part of the Scottish Government Regenerational Grant Funding that the old Kilmarnock Academy building, which is listed, would be used as the new home for Kilmarnock-based charity CentreStage. CentreStage moved from their former James Little Street premises, and opened on the Elmbank Drive site in August 2021.

== Performance and attainment ==
In 2022, Kilmarnock Academy was the top performing school in East Ayrshire based on exam result attainment data of pupils who received the Scottish Government educational “gold standard” of achieving 5 Highers passes. 38% of pupils attending Kilmarnock Academy achieved five or more higher qualifications, with the school ranking 149th amongst Scottish secondary schools on pupil attainment in higher passes.

In 2022, it was ranked as the 233rd best performing state school in Scotland, an increase from 247th in the 2021 league table rankings.

== Leadership ==
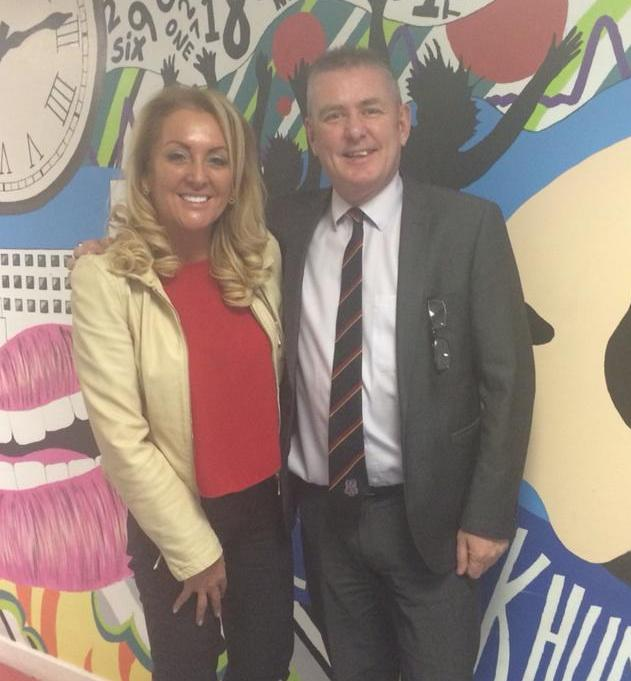
Bryan Paterson, head teacher from 2011–2015, with businesswoman and former pupil Marie Macklin.

In recent years, the term 'rector' has been phased out to introduce the title of 'head teacher'. Bryan Paterson held the post of head teacher from August 2011 until June 2015, when he left in order to take up the position of head teacher at Trinity Academy, Edinburgh. Carole Ford was the first woman to serve as head teacher, from 1997–2011, and remains the only female to have taken up the position. The current head teacher of the school is David Rose, who was responsible for overseeing the transition and merger of Kilmarnock Academy and James Hamilton Academy at a new school campus.

In May 2025, the incumbent head teacher of the school, David Rose, was seconded by East Ayrshire Council to assume the role of interim head teacher at Loudoun Academy, with Angela Brownlie, one of the depute head teachers at Kilmarnock Academy assuming the role of acting head teacher. Rose returned to Kilmarnock Academy on a permanent basis in August 2025 following an appointment at Loudoun Academy.

The following list is of rectors, and later head teachers, of Kilmarnock Academy.

Rectors

- William Thomson (1808–1830)
- Alexander Harkness (1830–1851)
- William Taylor (1851–1852)
- Alexander Smith (1852–1869)
- George Younger (1869–1873)
- George Smith (1873–1876)
- Hugh Dickie (1876–1904)
- David Murray (1904–1907)
- James Clark (1907–1926)
- Alexander Cumming (1926–1938)
- Robert McIntyre (1938–1964)
- James Hislop (1964–1977)
- Frank Donnelly (1977–1997)

Head teachers

- Carole Ford (1997–2011)
- Bryan Paterson (2011–2015)
- David Rose (2015–present)

== Notable former pupils ==
Kilmarnock Academy has educated two Nobel laureates: Alexander Fleming and John Boyd Orr. Other notable individuals who have attended Kilmarnock Academy include:

- Hugh Anderson (1920–2003), theologian
- Stuart Atha, air vice-marshal, AOC since 2011 of No. 1 Group RAF, and station commander from 2006–08 of RAF Coningsby
- Craig Conway, Scotland international footballer
- Bob Ellis (born 1940), cricketer
- Steven Brown, artist
- Nesbitt Gallacher (born 1936), cricketer
- Stephen Hillier, air chief marshal, chief of the Air Staff 2016–2019
- Robert Murdoch Smith, major general, engineer, archaeologist and diplomat
- Lorraine Fullbrook (Campbell), Conservative Member of Parliament, South Ribble, Lancashire – Elected 2010
- Ronnie Hamilton, professional footballer
- James Barr, Labour MP from 1935 to 1945 for Coatbridge, and from 1924 to 1931 for Motherwell
- Matthew Black, professor of divinity and Biblical criticism from 1954 to 1978 at the University of St Andrews
- Robert Colquhoun, artist
- Stewart Conn, poet and playwright
- David Cuthbertson, physician
- Robert Dunsmuir (1825-1889), Canadian industrialist and politician
- George Forrest, botanist and explorer
- Adam Ingram, SNP MSP 2011-2016 for Carrick, Cumnock and Doon Valley
- Billy Kay, writer, broadcaster and Scots language advocate
- Jimmy Knapp, general secretary from 1990 to 2001 of the RMT, and from 1983 to 1990 of the National Union of Railwaymen
- James Learmonth, pioneer in nerve surgery
- Margaret McDowall, swimmer
- William McIlvanney, author
- Robert Menzies, lieutenant-general, surgeon general to the Armed Forces from 2000 to 2002
- William Muir, orientalist
- Colin Rankin (1869-1940), soldier, politician and businessman
- James Stevenson, 1st Baron Stevenson, businessman and politician
- Murray Tosh, Conservative MSP from 2003 to 2007 for the West of Scotland
- Marie Macklin, CEO of The KLIN Group and founder and executive chair of The HALO Urban Regeneration

A number of alumni are Church of Scotland ministers who have held high office or are otherwise well-known church figures:

- Andrew McLellan, moderator of the General Assembly, 2000; (also HM Chief Inspector of Prisons for Scotland, 2002 to 2009)
- John D. Miller, moderator of the General Assembly, 2001
- Bill Hewitt, moderator of the General Assembly, 2009
- John L. Bell, contemporary hymnwriter and speaker
- Lorna Hood (née Mitchell), moderator of the General Assembly, 2013

== See also ==
- List of the oldest schools in the United Kingdom
- List of the oldest schools in Scotland
