= Steven Brown (artist) =

Scottish artist

- Born: Steven John Brown; February 1972; Kilmarnock, Ayrshire, Scotland
- Education: Kilmarnock Academy
- Notable work: McCoo
- Style: Scottish, landscapes, colour
- Spouse: Caroline Brown (m. 1990s)
- Children: 3
- Website: Steven Brown Art

Steven John Brown (born February 1972) is a Scottish artist who is known for his Scotland inspired landscapes, culture, fauna and flora, often created with a blend of bright colours.

Born in Kilmarnock in 1972, Brown was educated at Kilmarnock Academy and began painting following a series of two heart attacks in 2012 in an attempt to assist his recovery and aid his depression as a result.

He was the company director of Steven Brown Art Limited, the company he established in August 2016 to sell his artwork. At its peak, Brown had a warehouse and store in Ayr, as well as a store in Glasgow, before the company went into liquidation in 2019. The company was eventually dissolved entirely in June 2022.

== Early life ==
Steven Brown was born in 1972, in the Scottish town of Kilmarnock, a large settlement in Ayrshire (now East Ayrshire). He attended Kilmarnock Academy, the town's main secondary school, before moving to Irvine, also in Ayrshire, in 1992. After leaving school in 1987, despite always "dreaming" of becoming an artist, Brown worked in the retail industry until a series of two heart attacks in 2012. At school, Brown said that his teachers had encouraged him to "pursue a career in art".

Brown was the store manager of a KFC branch until he left in 2012 following his heart attacks.

== Career ==
=== Beginnings ===
After falling ill in 2010, Brown had to take a period of time off from his job as a store manager at KFC and began to focus on painting in an attempt to assist his recovery. Brown explained that he is "not one of those people who can just sit in the house doing nothing all day, so my wife Caroline got me a canvas and some paints to keep me occupied". Following this, Brown began to explore painting again, re–teaching himself how to use paints "by looking at techniques from different artists and practicing relentlessly".

At one point, Brown claimed to have had "up to 50 canvas paintings" in his drawing room, with his with Caroline urging Brown to do something with the paintings in order to clear space. Brown then began to sell his canvas paintings online on the website Art Gallery and within two days, Brown claimed that the demand for his artwork had "just exploded". After a successful recovery, Brown returned to his full–time employment at KFC, continuing to paint in the evenings and his spare time and continued to sell his artwork online. Brown took commissions from customers, and it was from a suggestion from one of those commissions that Brown's signature artwork, The McCoo, was created. In 2015, Brown suffered another heart attack, resulting in Brown leaving his employment and focusing on art full time.

=== Steven Brown Art Ltd ===
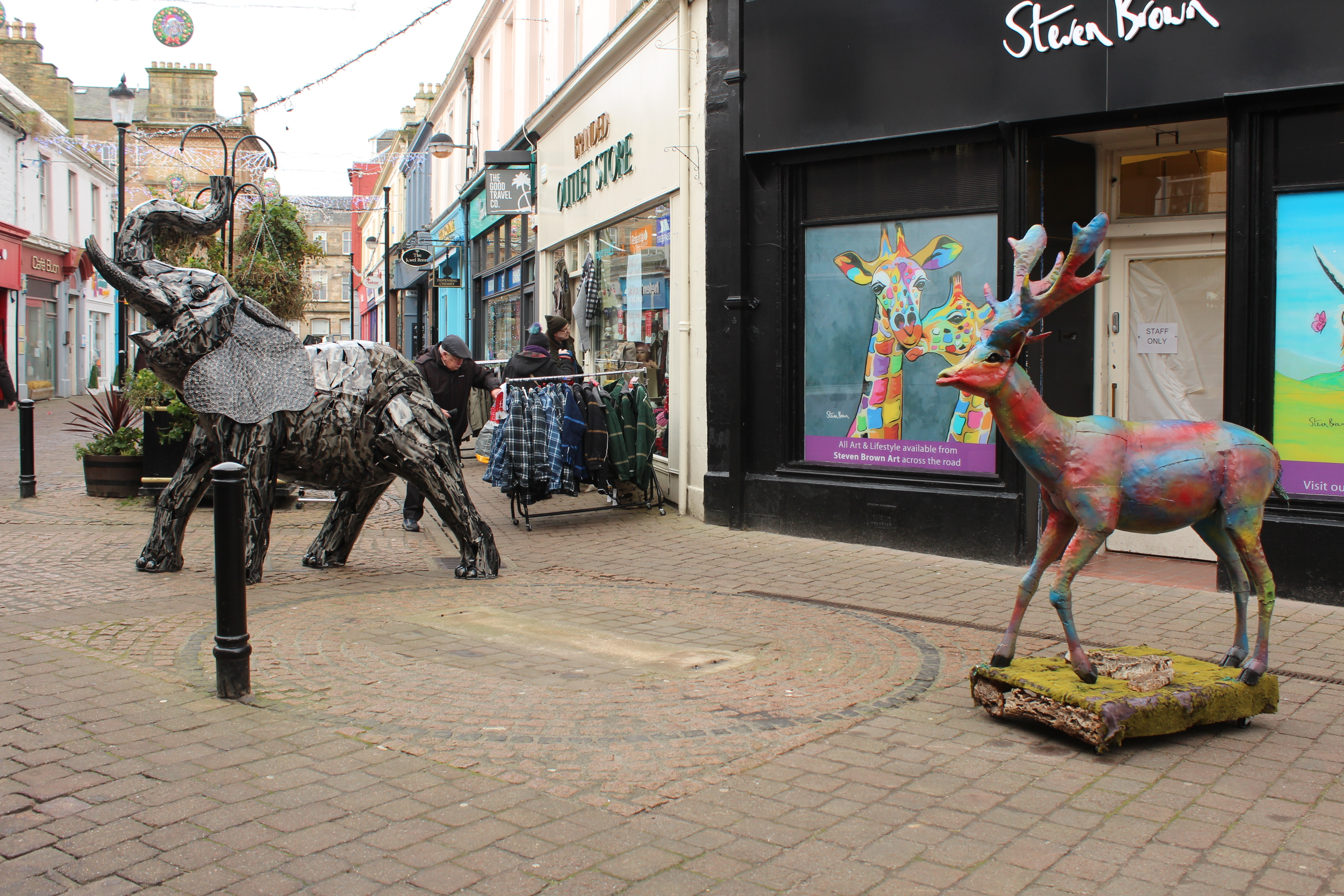
Steven Brown Art store and art gallery in Newmarket Street, Ayr

Brown opened his first store in Ayr, South Ayrshire, a coastal town on the Firth of Clyde in Scotland, in 2016. The store featured an art gallery of Brown's works, as well as a store in which the public could purchase Brown's art. That same year, Brown founded Steven Brown Art Limited, the company responsible for the management and operation of the art gallery and store in Ayr. At its peak, it employed 21 employees and had a turnover of £11.5 million.

One of Brown's other stores in Ayr, and one in the Silverburn Shopping Centre in Glasgow had closed in April 2019. There was initial confusion at the sudden closure of the Ayr showroom and store in July 2019, with Brown insisting that the location had not permanently closed, rather, it was closed for a refurbishment process. During this period of confusion, Brown claimed to have received death threats from employees who claimed that they had not been paid and were fearful that they had in fact lost their jobs after having no communication from Brown about the sudden closure of his Ayr art gallery and store.

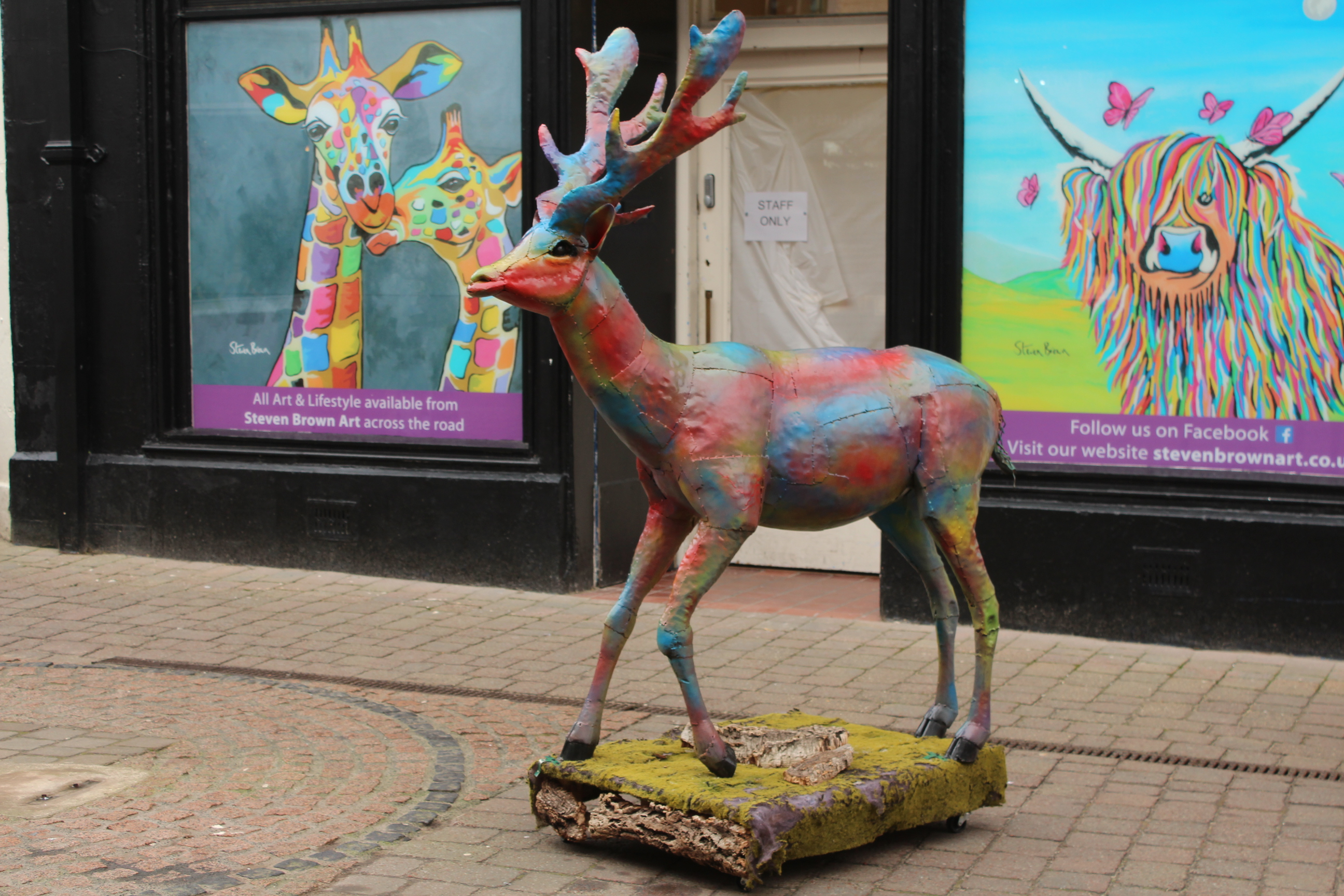
A Steven Brown inspired Deer sculpture outside his Ayr store, with two of his artwork in the background

In 2019, Steven Brown Art Limited went into liquidation and the Ayr store, art gallery and warehouse were closed. FRP Advisory were appointed as advisors for the business, and began to sell off the businesses assets which included artwork, merchandise and art prints. Tom MacLennan, the joint provisional liquidator, claimed that "although the company grew rapidly, it had been suffering from serious cash flow problems and creditor pressure. As such the only option was to place the company in liquidation". At the time of its liquidation, the business owed £1 million to creditors after failing to pay a number of payment bills to suppliers of the business. One creditor was estimated to be owed in the region of £750,000 from the business. Staff at the Ayr gallery, warehouse and store, arrived at work and were told that they would not be paid and that the company, which they were told was "not making any money" was "likely to go into receivership".

Brown faced public backlash in 2019 after announcing he had begun working for the firm which bought the rights to his artwork prior to the company going into liquidation. He began working as a Brand Ambassador for the firm, which had opened a store which began to sell artwork by Brown in the same street in Ayr where Brown had his art gallery, warehouse and store before it closed. The announcement was met with criticism by Brown's former employees who were made redundant following the companies collapse. A former employee of Steven Brown Art Limited claimed that Brown had "still not spoken to any of the staff he let go but can meet and greet the fans like nothing happened", further adding that the situation was "a disgrace".

=== DGD Ltd ===
Brown is an employee of DGD Ltd, a company which purchased the rights to sell, manufacture and distribute Brown's artwork. Following backlash from former employees of his decision to commence employment with the company who purchased the rights to his art following his own companies collapse, Brown claimed "it is not my company and I am nothing to do with it except being an employee". On his decision to commencement employment with the company, Brown claimed his decision was based on the fact that "it keeps the art alive and thousands of people happy worldwide".

== Artwork ==
Below is a list of some of the most popular artworks by Brown. The list is not a complete comprehensive listing of all of the artwork painted or sold by Brown:

- Heather McCoo
- Allan and Jakie McCoo
- Francie and Josie McZoo
- Lizzie McCoo
- Andy & Amy McZoo and The Wean
- Rab McCoo
- Angus McCoo
- Harris McCoo
- Charlie McCoo
- McHappily Ever After
- Marie McCoo
- Home
- Home Too
- Forest Of Argyle
- Dougie McCoo
- Baby McCoo
- Gordon McCoo
- Oor Wullie & Big Tam McCoo
- Kim McZoo
- Purple Forest
- Barbara, Doris & Jack McCheety
- Save the Ocean Families
- Agnes McCoo & The Weans
- Molly McDug
- Debra McZoo
- Isla & Arran McCoo
- Toby Mori McCoo
- Forest Of Loch Lomond
- McCoos in Love
- Sam McCoo
- Huey McCoo
- Donald McDeer
- Hamish McCoo
- Rab & Isa McCoo
- Oor Senga McCoo
- Tree Of Aura
- Alec & Annie McZoo
- The McBunnies
- Scottish Summer
- Lewis McZoo
- Paddy McCoo
- Tree Of Life
- Hannah McWave & The Weans
- Boris McZoo
- Geordie McCoo & The Wee Yin
- Bonnie McButterflee
- Isobel & Moira McZoo
- Scottish Autumn

== Personal life ==
Brown resides in Irvine, North Ayrshire, where he moved in 1992. He lives with his wife, Caroline Brown, and has three children and two grandchildren.
