= Billy Kay (writer) =

Scottish writer, broadcaster and language activist

- Born: 1951 (age 74–75); Galston, East Ayrshire, Scotland
- Education: University of Edinburgh
- Occupations: Writer, broadcaster and language activist
- Writing career
- Language: Scots
- Notable work: Scots: The Mither Tongue (1986)
- Notable awards: Mark Twain Award (2019); Scots Media Person of the Year (2019)
- Movement: Scots Language

Billy Kay (born 1951) is a Scottish writer, broadcaster and language activist. He developed an early interest in language, studying English, French, German and Russian at Kilmarnock Academy and English literature at the University of Edinburgh.

His study of the history and status of the Scots language, Scots: The Mither Tongue, his most notable work, was later adapted for a television series, and an audiobook, recorded after setting up a home studio during the COVID-19 lockdown. Kay thought that many people would not have heard 'how the language sounds' in major Scots literature such as Barbour's Brus, R.L. Stevenson's Thrawn Janet, works by MacDiarmid and Burns or the Border Ballads covered in his book: a sound version, he said, would 'fill a big gap' in people's 'knowledge and appreciation of a great tradition'.

== Odyssey ==
Kay's popular radio series, Odyssey, broadcast by BBC Radio Scotland in 1979, was a ground-breaking work of oral history which captured the diverse experiences of men and women across Scotland, including migrants from Donegal, Kintyre fishermen, Lithuanians in Lanarkshire, Dundee jute workers, Shetland whalers, Tiree emigrants to Canada, and servicemen seeking to exercise their land rights on returning to Knoydart after the Second World War. The following year, Odyssey: Voices from Scotland’s Recent Past, a collection of material drawn from the first series, was published by Polygon Books.

Despite the success of the first Odyssey radio series, no money was forthcoming to make any further programmes. Stewart Conn, BBC Scotland's Head of Drama, stepped in, attaching Kay to the drama department to ensure that the project survived. Three radio series of Odyssey were broadcast and a series was commissioned for television. Odyssey: Voices from Scotland's Recent Past: The Second Collection, based on material from the later series, was published by Polygon in 1982.

Kay drew on material on Dundee's female jute workers collected for the Odyssey series in writing Jute!, which was broadcast as a dramatised documentary directed by Marylin Ireland.

== Knee Deep in Claret ==
Knee Deep in Claret: A Celebration of Wine and Scotland, a collaboration with Cailean Maclean published by Mainstream in 1984, used the theme of Scotland's relationship with wine to explore aspects of Scottish culture from the 13th to the 20th centuries. A television programme based on the book was broadcast in the same year. A production based on the book was presented by the Saltire Society on the Edinburgh Festival Fringe in August 1985, in which Kay was supported by the singer Rod Paterson and musicians Jim Sutherland and Derek Hoy.

== Bibliography ==
- Made in Scotland (contributor), Carcanet, 1974, ISBN 9780856350832
- Odyssey: Voices from Scotland's Recent Past (editor), Polygon, 1980, ISBN 9780904919479
- Odyssey: Voices from Scotland's Recent Past - the Second Collection (editor), Polygon, 1982, ISBN 9780904919554
- Knee Deep in Claret: A Celebration of Wine and Scotland (with Cailean Maclean), Mainstream, 1983, ISBN 9780906391921
- Scots: The Mither Tongue, Mainstream, 1986, ISBN 9781845960520
- The Dundee Book: An Anthology of Living in the City (editor), Mainstream, 1990
- The New Makars (contributor), Mercat Press, 1991
- The Scots Map and Guide, MMA Maps, 1993
- A Tongue in Yer Heid (contributor), B & W Publishing, 1994, ISBN 9781873631355
- Scotland and Ulster (contributor), Mercat Press, 1994, ISBN 9781873644195
- Mak it New (contributor), Mercat Press, 1995, ISBN 9781873644461
- The Complete Odyssey: Voices from Scotland's Recent Past (editor), Polygon, 1996, ISBN 9780748661756
- The Scottish World: A Journey into the Scottish Diaspora, Mainstream, 2006
- Scotland and the Easter Rising: Fresh Perspectives on 1916 (contributor), Luath Press, ISBN 9781910745366
- audiobook: Scots: The Mither Tongue Audible 2021

== Prizes and awards ==
- 1973 Grierson Verse Prize (University of Edinburgh)
- 1974/75 Slom Prize for writing in Scots
- 1989 New York Radio Festival Silver Medal (radio series) The Scots of Ulster
- 1992 New York Radio Festival Bronze Medal (radio series) The Road and the Miles
- 1994 Sloan Prize - University of St Andrews (radio play) Lucky's Strike
- 1994 Wine Guild Houghton Award (radio programme) Fresche Fragrant Clairettis
- 1995 Heritage Society Award
- 1996 Wines of France Award Knee Deep in Claret: A Celebration of Wine and Scotland
- 2019 Mark Twain Award
- 2019 Scots Media Person of the Year

== See also ==
- Scots language
