= Marie Macklin =

Scottish businesswoman, entrepreneur (born 1965)

Marie Macklin CBE
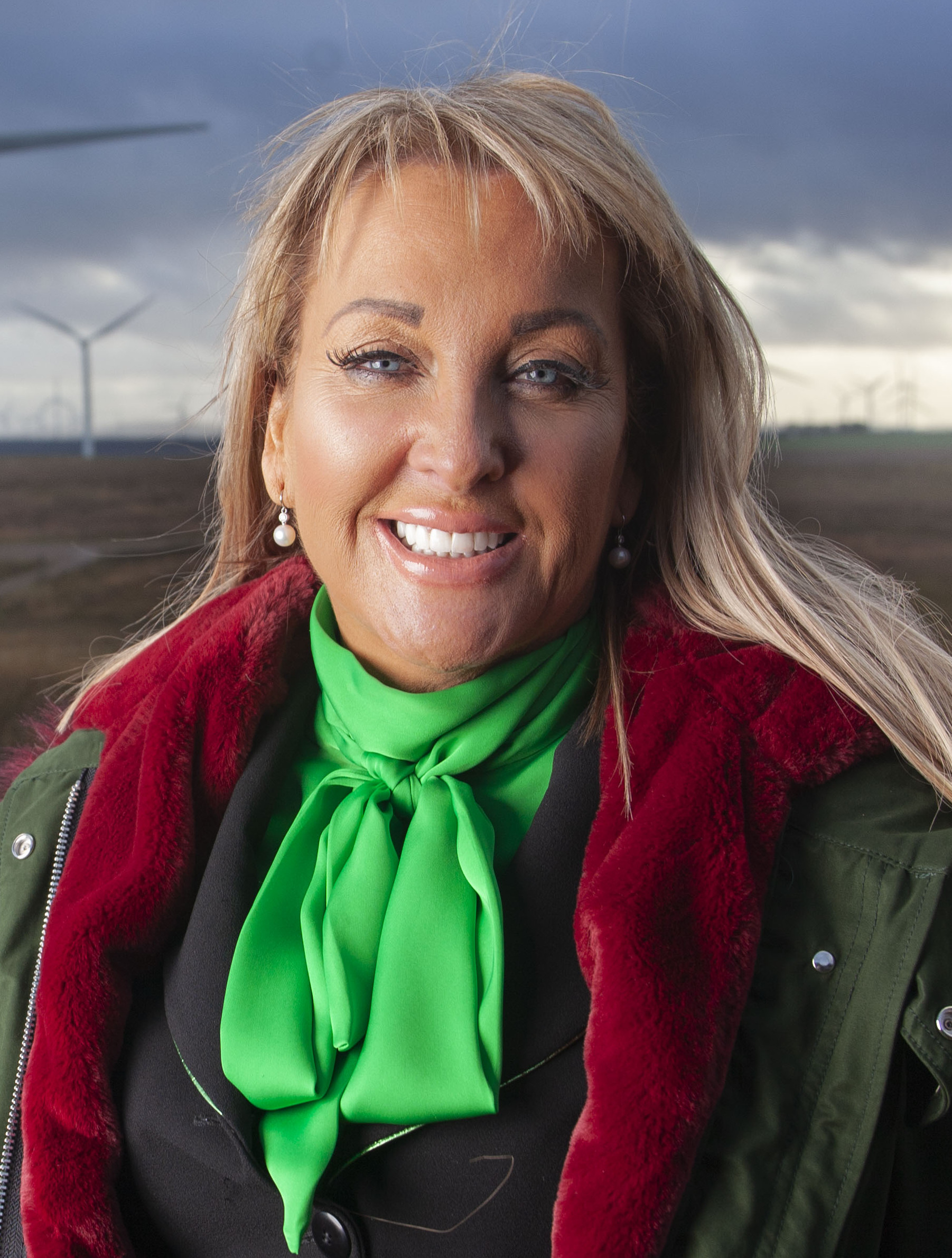
- Macklin in December 2018
- Born: Mary Stewart Macklin; 20 October 1965 (age 60); Kilmarnock, Ayrshire, Scotland
- Occupations: Entrepreneur, property developer
- Years active: 1988–present
- Website: Marie Macklin

Mary Stewart Macklin CBE (born 20 October 1965) is a Scottish businesswoman, entrepreneur and property developer, who is founder and executive chair of The HALO Urban Regeneration. Macklin was previously the CEO of The KLIN Group from 2004 until 2014 and was director of Klin Holdings Ltd. until her resignation on 6 February 2015.

== Early life ==
Macklin was born Mary Stewart Macklin in Kilmarnock, Ayrshire. Her father, John Dick created The KLIN Group in 1988 which focused on construction. In the early 2000s, Macklin bought The KLIN Group from her father. Her father originally worked as a bricklayer, whilst her mother was a hosiery worker. Macklin attended Kilmarnock Academy.

== Career ==
=== The KLIN Group ===
Macklin purchased The KLIN Group in 2004 and became chief executive officer of the company. Macklin sought to move the company away from construction as it had been founded in 1988 and take the company in the direction of regeneration of urban areas. Macklin had entered into negotiations with supermarket chain Morrisons to expand into Scotland, using Kilmarnock as their debut store in 2004.

Under Macklin's ownership and direction, the KLIN Group would be responsible for the redevelopment of other major sites within Kilmarnock, including the restoration of Barclay House, the former offices and workspace for Andrew Barclay Sons & Co., turning the derelict building into commercial use and housing. Barclay House now serves as the main headquarters and administrative offices for the KLIN Group and has undergone extensive renovation work to provide additional office space for various companies within Kilmarnock, as well as housing space for rent or lease. Barclay House is home to a locomotive train, Drake, that was built by Andrew Barclay in the early 1940s for the war effort during World War II.

Macklin sold the KLIN Group in 2015 and it continues to trade.

=== HALO Urban Regeneration ===
Following the announcement in 2009 by drinks company Diageo of their intention to close the Johnnie Walker bottling plant and production factory at Hill Street in Kilmarnock, Macklin joined a large protest of 20,000 people through the streets of Kilmarnock in an attempt to persuade Diageo to reverse their decisions. Following unsuccessful attempts, Diageo remained with their decision for closure, leading Macklin to enter negotiations with Diageo to look at options for sale of the site and long-term plans for the future use of the site. Diageo eventually sold the land to HALO Group for £1, which led Macklin to create a £100 million regeneration proposal, The HALO Urban Regeneration.

Whilst plans were initially drafted and negotiations conducted with Macklin through her position in the KLIN Group, Macklin later formed The HALO Urban Regeneration which took on much of the work responsible for the creation and development of the plans relating to The HALO Kilmarnock. Macklin's proposal for the former Johnnie Walker site included an urban regeneration hub, as well as providing office space and opportunities for startup companies, and since, has formed a number of working partnerships with companies such as Scottish Power.

Macklin worked with East Ayrshire Council, the Scottish Government and the UK Government to secure £7.0 million in funding towards The HALO project, contributed by both the Scottish Government and UK Government as part of the Ayrshire Growth Deal.

Marie has worked with XLCC to create 300 jobs at the HALO Enterprise and Innovation Centre in Kilmarnock.

=== Work with education ===
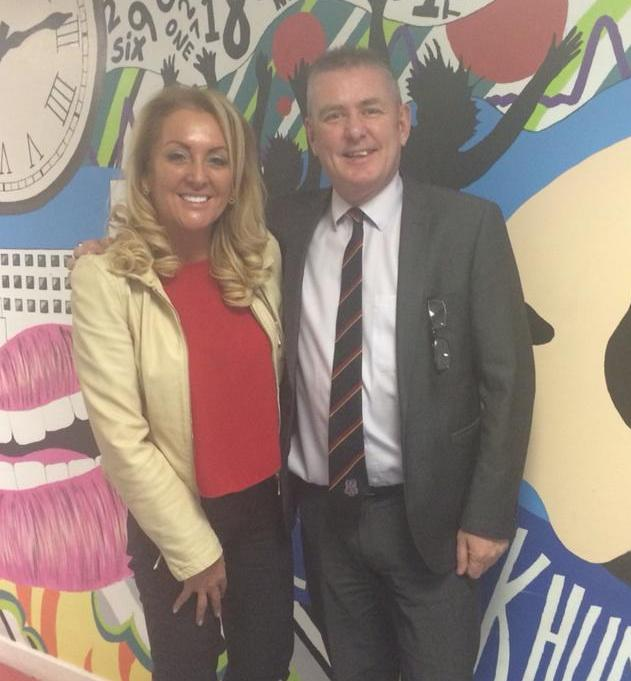
Macklin with Kilmarnock Academy head teacher Bryan Paterson, 2015

Macklin has worked with school pupils to develop their knowledge of business and enterprise, particularly at her former secondary school Kilmarnock Academy, where she has been an advocate for and mentor to school pupils in creating business plans and proposals.

Macklin, as founder of The Halo Urban Regeneration, has formed business partnerships with neighbouring Ayrshire College with a focus on developing a digital workforce for the future within Kilmarnock and Ayrshire.

=== Other work ===
Macklin carries out additional work as a motivational speaker to companies and students, including speaking to students at Glasgow Caledonian University.

In addition, she is a regular commentator on UK and Scottish current affairs, appearing on programmes such as STV's Scotland Tonight and BBC Scotland's Debate Night, as well as contributing to publications including The Times, The Herald and The Scotsman.

In November 2024, Marie joined the board at the Scottish North American Business Council.

== Personal life ==
Macklin was raised in Kilmarnock, in the Onthank area which featured in the documentary series The Scheme (2009), a BBC Scotland documentary series focusing on an area of Kilmarnock with high levels of poverty. Macklin speaks highly of her upbringing in Kilmarnock and as a reason for her work towards regeneration projects in the town.

== Awards and recognitions ==
Macklin has received numerous accolades during her career, such as being awarded the Women in Enterprise, in partnership with the Association of Scottish Businesswomen, whose Award for Outstanding Contribution to Business she received in 2013. In 2015, the Association named her as Woman of Inspiration to Business in Scotland. In the 2015 New Year Honours, Macklin was awarded with a Commander of the British Empire (CBE) for services to Economic Regeneration and Entrepreneurship in Scotland (Kilmarnock, Ayrshire and Arran).

In 2016, Macklin was recognised as Business Woman of the Year and in November 2016 was recognised by the Scottish Business Awards as Female Business Leader of the year. In March 2017, Macklin was named non-executive director of the year by the Institute of Directors Scotland for her work with Appointedd.

In October 2017, she was named Scotland’s Businesswoman of the year by Women’s Enterprise Scotland. She was awarded The Belfast Ambassador Medal in 2018 at The Belfast International Homecoming – Capital and Investment Conference for services to the communities of Belfast. She was awarded The London Scottish Great Scot Award 2022 For Outstanding Achievement in Business and the BWS (Businesswomen Scotland) Scottish Businesswoman for Entrepreneurship /Innovation 2023.

In 2018, Macklin was awarded with an honorary doctorate by Glasgow Caledonian University within the Glasgow School for Business and Society and the School of Engineering and Built Environment, due to the university's recognition of "outstanding contribution to the business world and Macklin's outstanding commitment to GCU students and the work of the University for the Common Good".

== See also ==
- The KLIN Group
- The HALO Urban Regeneration
