= Saint Joseph's Academy, Kilmarnock =

Coordinates: 55°37′2″N 4°28′47″W

Saint Joseph's Academy
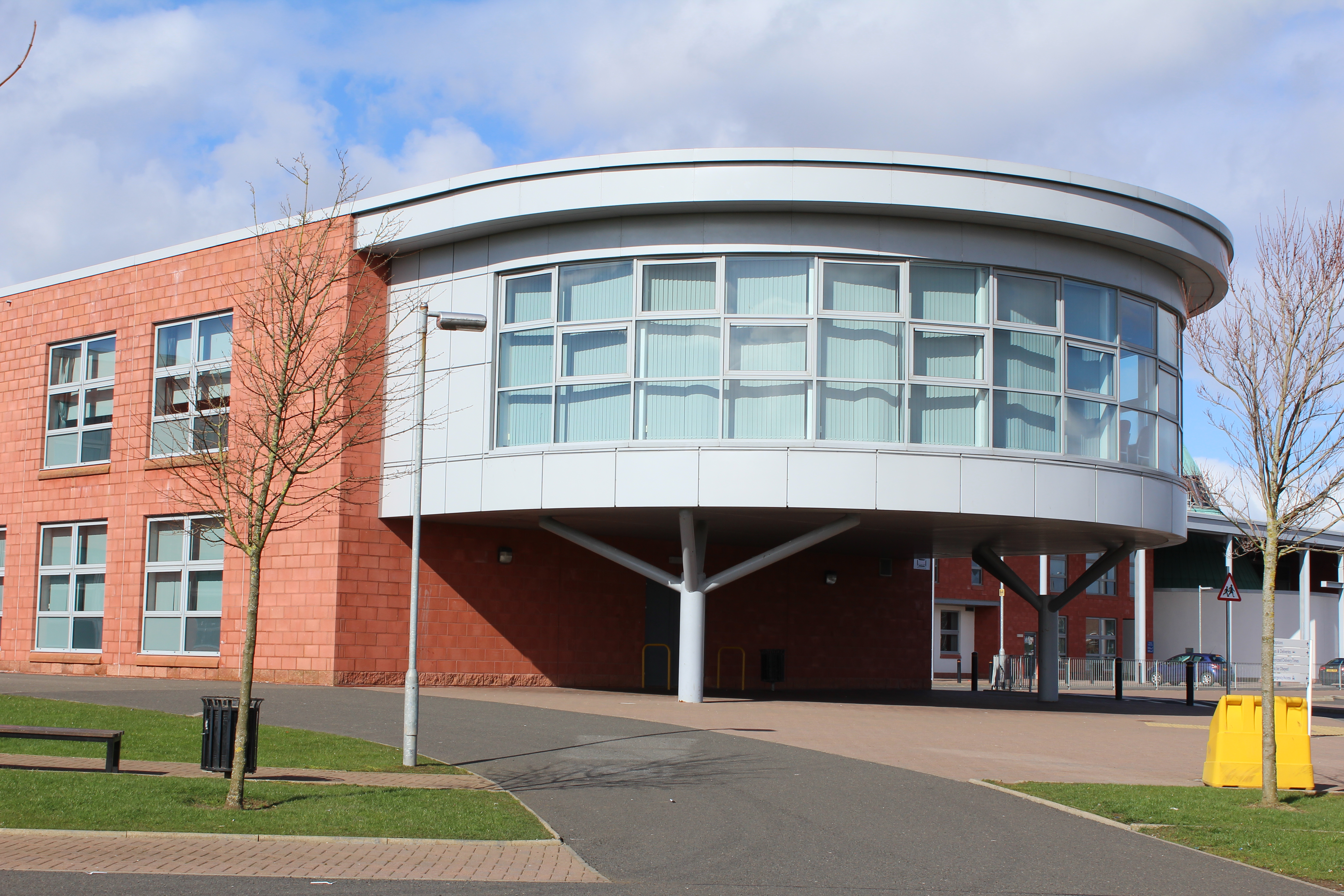
- School badge St. Josephs' Academy building

Location
- Grassyards Road; Kilmarnock, East Ayrshire, KA3 7SL; Scotland

Information
- Type: State comprehensive
- Motto: Fidelis – Justus – Prudens
- Religious affiliation: Roman Catholic
- Established: 1955
- Headteacher: Joseph Kane
- Gender: Boys and girls
- Age: 11 to 18
- Enrolment: 648 pupils (2023)
- Houses: St Mother Teresa; St Francis of Assisi; St Carlo Acutis
- Colour
- Year Groups: S1-S6
- Website: Saint Jostephs' Academy Blog

Saint Joseph's Academy (Scottish Gaelic: Acadamaidh Naomh Iòsaph) is an 11–18 Roman Catholic secondary school in the New Farm Loch area of the town of Kilmarnock, situated in East Ayrshire, Scotland. In 2023, the school roll stood at 648 pupils, with an FTE allocation of 45.8FTE teaching staff. The school is supported by five priests from local parish communities.

== History ==
=== Establishment and 20th century ===
St Joseph's Academy was founded in 1955 in its present location. Initially built on what was the outskirts of Kilmarnock at the time, the adjacent New Farm Loch estate eventually grew and enveloped the school. The original St Joseph's campus, opened in 1955, included a large playing field, comprising a red blaze hockey pitch, running tracks, and space for 4 grass football pitches.

St. Conval's High School was later annexed with St. Joseph's in October 1998 and became known as St. Joseph's Cumnock Campus. In 2004 however St. Joseph's Cumnock Campus was shut down due to falling attendance, and the town's Catholic children now attend the new St. Joseph's Academy campus in Kilmarnock, which now serves the entire secondary Catholic population of East Ayrshire.

=== Rebuild and 21st century ===
In the early 21st century, a programme was initiated by central government to upgrade secondary schools throughout the country using a mixture of public and private money. St Joseph's was one of the schools selected for demolition and reconstruction, along with nearby Grange Academy. On 17 September 2008, the rebuilt St Joseph's was opened, including the new St Andrew's Primary - an amalgamation of the former feeder St Columba's and St Matthew's Primaries. The campus now houses St. Joseph's Academy, St. Andrew's Primary School and St. Andrew's Early Learning and Childcare Centre. In August 2023, Senior Phase pupils from Park School (ordinarily located at Grange Academy Campus) moved to St. Joseph's Campus on a trial basis.

The Campus has a full size synthetic football pitch and during the evenings and weekends is used by East Ayrshire Leisure, whereby local clubs, teams and groups can hire indoor and outdoor facilities. The campus houses East Ayrshire Council's Learning Outdoors Support Team (LOST) and is the working base for all of East Ayrshire Council's educational psychologists.

The current head teacher, Joseph Kane, took up the post in February 2018. In November 2025, Mrs Angela Buchanan was appointed as Acting HT while Mr. Joseph Kane undertakes a secondment with the local authority.

== Overview ==
=== Catchment area ===
Whilst the school is located in Kilmarnock, it serves the entire Catholic secondary school aged population in East Ayrshire, with the school being the only Roman Catholic secondary school within the local authority area. This means for families in all areas of East Ayrshire, St. Joseph's Academy is a catchment Secondary school. A long-standing inter-authority arrangement sees a small number of primary seven pupils attending St. Xavier's Primary School in Patna, transition to Queen Margaret Academy located in Ayr, South Ayrshire instead of Saint Josephs' Academy at the start of S1.

=== Diocese of Galloway ===
The school is one of four Catholic secondary schools in the Diocese of Galloway, with the others being Queen Margaret Academy, Ayr, South Ayrshire, St Matthew's Academy, Saltcoats, North Ayrshire and St. Joseph's College, Dumfries, Dumfries and Galloway.

=== Associated Primary schools ===
Currently, the school takes its pupils from the local Catholic primary schools, not just from Kilmarnock but the surrounding towns and villages. These schools are:

- St. Andrew's in Kilmarnock
- Mount Carmel in Kilmarnock
- St. Sophia's in Galston
- St. Patrick's in Auchinleck
- St. Xavier's in Patna

== Alumni ==
- Mark Bennett (rugby union, born 1993), professional rugby player, Scotland national rugby union team

== See also ==
- East Ayrshire Council; the local authority responsible for overseeing the schools operations
- Education Scotland; the executive agency of the Scottish Government responsible for school inspections
- Catholic education
