= Bob Ellis (cricketer) =

Scottish cricketer (born 1940)

Personal information
- Full name: Robert Ellis
- Born: 19 May 1940 (age 86); Kilmarnock, Ayrshire, Scotland
- Batting: Left-handed
- Bowling: Right-arm medium

Domestic team information
- Years: Team
- 1963–1974: Scotland

Career statistics
| Competition | First-class |
|---|---|
| Matches | 10 |
| Runs scored | 133 |
| Batting average | 13.30 |
| 100s/50s | –/– |
| Top score | 35 |
| Balls bowled | 774 |
| Wickets | 6 |
| Bowling average | 63.16 |
| 5 wickets in innings | – |
| 10 wickets in match | – |
| Best bowling | 1/3 |
| Catches/stumpings | 6/– |
- Source: Cricinfo, 24 June 2022

Robert Ellis (born 19 May 1940) is a Scottish former first-class cricketer.

Ellis was born at Kilmarnock in May 1940. He was educated at Kilmarnock Academy, before matriculating to the University of Edinburgh. A club cricketer for Kilmarnock Cricket Club, Ellis made his debut for Scotland in first-class cricket against Warwickshire at Edinburgh in 1963. Ellis played first-class cricket for Scotland until 1974, making ten appearances. As a batsman, he scored 133 runs at an average of 13.30, with a highest score of 35. With his right-arm medium pace bowling, he took 6 wickets at a bowling average of 63.63; in first-class cricket, he bowled a total of 129 overs. He later played club cricket for Ayr Cricket Club, captaining the side from 1980 to 1982. Outside of cricket, he was by profession a schoolteacher.
