= Nesbitt Gallacher =

Scottish cricketer

Personal information
- Full name: Thomas Nesbitt Gallacher
- Born: 3 April 1936 (age 90); Kilmarnock, Ayrshire, Scotland
- Batting: Right-handed

Domestic team information
- Years: Team
- 1965–1966: Scotland

Career statistics
Competition	First-class
Matches	4
Runs scored	126
Batting average	25.20
100s/50s	–/1
Top score	73
Catches/stumpings	–/–
- Source: Cricinfo, 26 July 2022

Thomas Nesbitt Gallacher (born 3 April 1936) is a Scottish former first-class cricketer.

Gallacher was born at Kilmarnock in April 1936, where he was educated at the Kilmarnock Academy. A club cricketer for Kilmarnock Cricket Club, he made his debut for Scotland in first-class cricket against the Marylebone Cricket Club at Glasgow in 1965. He made three further first-class appearances for Scotland, playing two further matches in 1965 against the touring New Zealanders and Ireland, before making a further appearance against Cambridge University at Fenner's in 1966. In his four first-class appearances, Gallacher scored 126 runs at an average of 25.20; he made one half century, a score of 73 against the touring New Zealanders at Glasgow.
