= Hugh Anderson (theologian) =

British theologian

Hugh Anderson FRSE (1920–2003) was a Scottish theologian who served as Professor of the New Testament at the University of Edinburgh for over 20 years.

== Life ==
Anderson was born in Galston, Ayrshire on 18 May 1920, the son of Jeannie Muir and her husband Hugh Anderson . He was educated at Galston Primaty School then Kilmarnock Academy, going on to study Classics and Semitic Languages at the University of Glasgow.

In the post-war period 1945/6 he was part of the Huts and Canteens Scheme in Egypt and Palestine before returning to the University of Glasgow to lecture on the Old Testament. In this period he gained his first doctorate (PhD) on the New Testament. In this same period he was also minister of Trinity Church in Pollockshields in Glasgow.

In 1957 he left Scotland to become Professor of Biblical Criticism at Duke University in North Carolina, USA. Much in demand, he preached at the Riverside Church in New York and at the Washington National Cathedral.

In 1966 he returned to Scotland as Professor of New Testament replacing Prof J. S. Stewart.

In 1987 he was elected a Fellow of the Royal Society of Edinburgh.

He died on 14 January 2003.

== Publications ==
- Jesus and Christian Origins (1964)
- Jesus (1968)
- The Gospel of Mark (1976)

== Family ==
In 1945 he was married to Jean Goldie Torbit and they had three children.
