= HALO Urban Regeneration =

Scottish business innovation park and start-up support company

- HALO logo (2019–present)

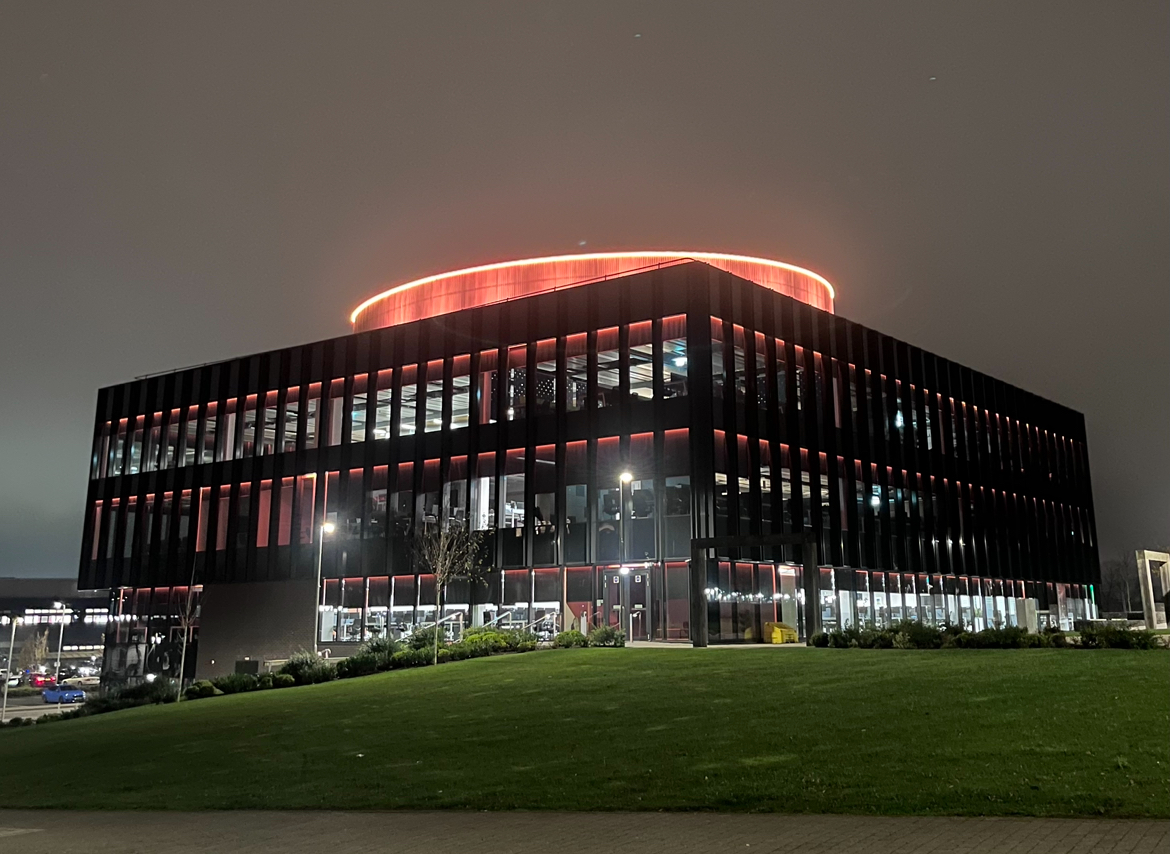
- Halo building on Hill Street in Kilmarnock, October 2024
- Type: Urban regeneration company
- Industry: Business start-up, urban renewal
- Founded: July 6, 2006; 20 years ago in Kilmarnock, Scotland
- Founder: Marie Macklin
- Headquarters: Hill Street, Kilmarnock, Scotland, KA1 3HY
- Area served: Scotland
- Key people: Marie Macklin CBE (founder and Executive Chair)
- Products: Business start-up Urban regeneration
- Revenue: £205 million (estimated)
- Owner: Marie Macklin
- Number of employees: 20 (2021)
- Website: HALO Scotland

HALO Urban Regeneration is a Scottish business innovation park, urban regeneration and business start-up support company, founded, based and headquartered in Kilmarnock, East Ayrshire, Scotland. The HALO Urban Regeneration was founded by entrepreneur Marie Macklin CBE in 2006 as HALO Urban Regeneration Company Ltd., having announced the project a few years prior to official funding and creation of the HALO Kilmarnock.

The HALO building on Hill Street, Kilmarnock, is a £63 million brownfield urban regeneration project constructed on a 23-acre site, formerly the home of Johnnie Walker, the world’s leading Scotch whisky brand that was founded in Kilmarnock in 1820 and operated on the site until Diageo closed the Kilmarnock plant in 2012.

HALO is projected to generate £205 million to the economy of Scotland and stimulate 1,500 jobs.

== HALO Scotland ==
=== Origins and establishment ===
Following the 2009 announcement of the closure of the Johnnie Walker whisky bottling unit and production factory in Kilmarnock, owners Diageo began seeking proposals for future leasing of the Hill Street site that occupied that 32-acre site at that time. Diageo gifted eight acres to Kilmarnock College (a campus of Ayrshire College since 2013) in 2012 to allow the construction of a new multi-million pound campus to replace the ageing building that was constructed during the 1960s.

Marie Macklin CBE, Chief Executive of The KLIN Group at the time, who had already undertaken numerous projects in and around Kilmarnock to restore derelict buildings in the town centre, submitted a proposal for a new, innovative hub to provide office space for startup companies and opportunities to enhance Kilmarnock's urban regeneration work.

=== Ayrshire Growth Deal ===
The HALO Urban Regeneration benefitted as part of the Ayrshire Growth Deal, an economic recovery agreement between the Scottish Government, UK Government, East Ayrshire Council, North Ayrshire Council and South Ayrshire Council, with the Scottish Government and UK Government both providing £3.5 million of investment for the company and the regeneration of the former Johnnie Walker site.

Diageo who owned the land when occupied by the former Johnnie Walker bottling and production plant facility donated the land for a cost of £1 and under the Ayrshire Growth Deal has been committed to a contribution of £2 million to support planning and design of the HALO development as well as long-term sustainability of the Hill Street site as a consequence for closing the Johnnie Walker facility.

=== Construction and opening ===
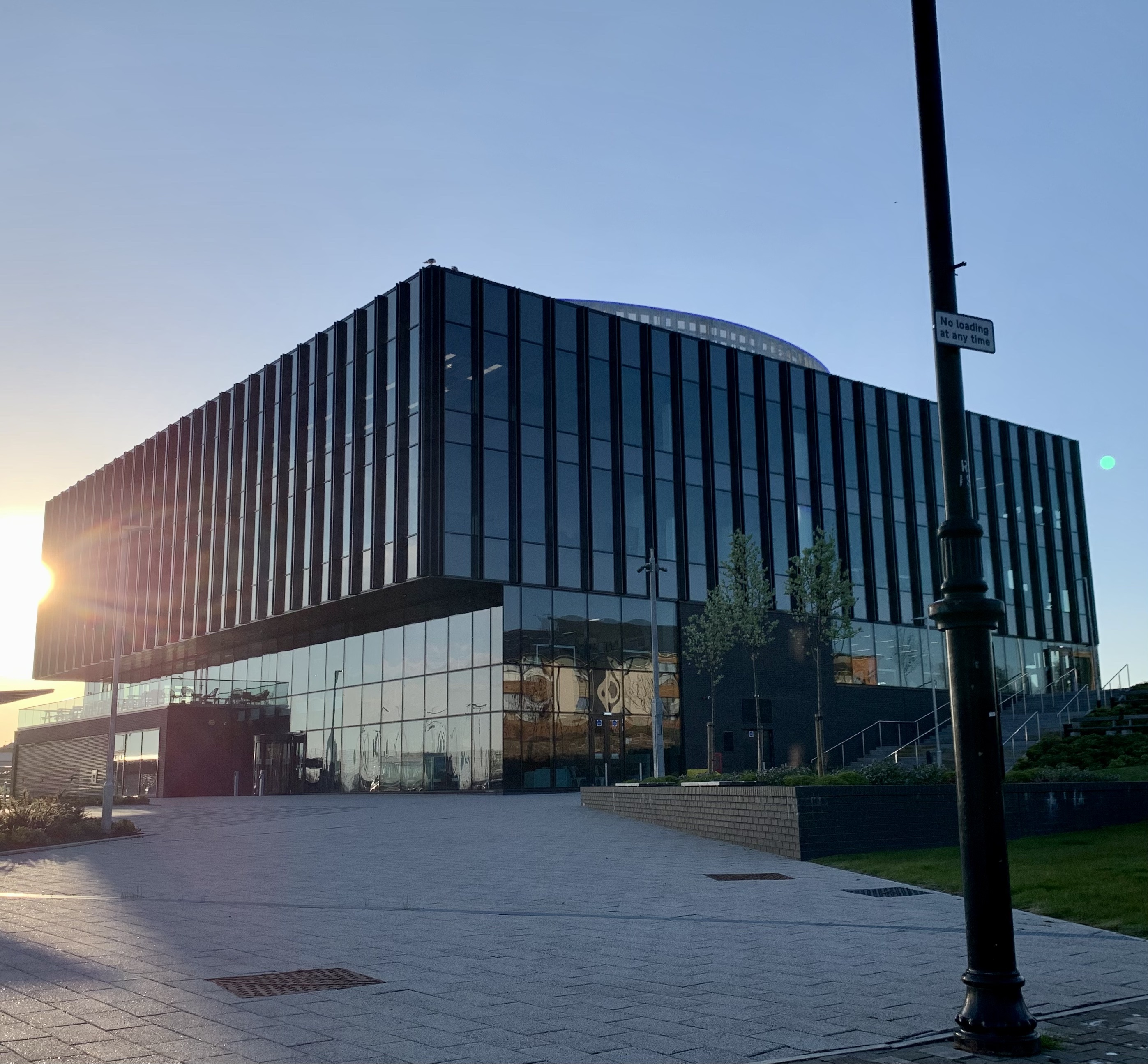
The Halo HQ building in Kilmarnock

A planning application for permission for construction work on the new project was submitted to the planning advisory board of East Ayrshire Council, was planning permission granted by the council in 2018. The cost of the development was estimated to be £65 million, with the Scottish Government announcing a £5.3 million investment in the HALO Project in August 2017, with £1.8 million to be focused on low carbon emissions which was ultimately unused.

Morrison Construction was appointed as main contractor for the construction of the complex in September 2019, with construction work initially scheduled to be completed by January 2021, however this was delayed as a result of the halt on construction works in Scotland due to the COVID-19 pandemic and phase one opened March 2022

The building in Kilmarnock is a 4-storey mixed used structure and constructed from three main materials—dark brick, curtain wall glazing and a perforated aluminium screen at roof level, features a round LED dome on the roof which illuminates at nighttime. Phase 1 of the complex was completed in July 2021 (the HALO Enterprise & Innovation Hub), with future phases of the sites development consisting of a series of live and work units, a leisure facility, nursery, and over 200 houses. The building has become a symbol of regeneration in Kilmarnock, both in terms of redevelopment of land as well as economic regeneration and recovery.

=== Expansion ===
A second HALO project is scheduled to begin planning and construction in Northern Ireland.

The HALO is scheduled to begin planning and construction of new premises to focus on urban regeneration projects in both Wales and England. The timescale for completion on these projects in England, Wales and Northern Ireland have still to be announced.

== Business partnerships ==
The HALO Urban Regeneration has established business partnerships with various companies and organisations to support the business in its key business strategy. Most notably, HALO Urban Regeneration focuses on education and youth employment opportunities and includes partners such as:

- East Ayrshire Council
- The Scottish Government
- The UK Government
- Diageo
- Scottish Power
- CGI
- Onecom
- Scottish Business Resilience Centre
- Barclays
- PRA Group

A business partnership in association with Scottish Power makes the energy company the main HALO Platinum Partner and Sponsor. Scottish Power launched a £5 million, five-year programme, with a focus on building and enhancing the companies focus and vision of "Utility of the Future" vision. The Halo Urban Regeneration claim that the company will be a leader in the HALO Innovation and Enterprise Centre and the Digital and Cyber Zone. HALO and Scottish Power have committed to working together to create a cyber and digital training and learning facility, at the forefront of the "Fourth Industrial Revolution".

The HALO Urban Regeneration developed a partnership with Barclays in order to enhance HALO's employability initiatives for individuals in Ayrshire, seeks to eradicate barriers those facing unemployment of any age many experience, through Barclays LifeSkills, allowing individuals to access education and digital technology. Additionally, the Barclays-HALO partnership seeks to help start-up and scale-up entrepreneurial businesses to capitalise on growth opportunities, as well as enhancing connectivity and collaboration with other businesses locally and across the UK. In 2019, Barclays launched their first Thriving Local Economies initiative in Kilmarnock as a result of their partnership with The Halo Urban Regeneration, with a particular focus on strategies to boost and enhance the economy of Kilmarnock.

== Economic performance ==
The HALO Urban Regeneration company aims to create and sustain over 1,500 jobs within Kilmarnock as well as a projected contribution of £205 million in Gross Domestic Product revenue to the Economy of Scotland.

== Ayrshire College partnership ==
As part of the sale of the 32-acre site by Diageo, Ayrshire College was granted part of the site which neighbours the HQ and office space of The Halo Urban Regeneration. Due to the close proximity and sharing the site, the company has formed an ambitious partnership with Ayrshire College to ensure the integration of the college with The HALO Urban Regeneration to progress a deep range of practical learning experiences for students, as well as developing new qualifications for Ayrshire College students, ranging from qualifications within the construction section, digital skills market, as well as social care and design.

The HALO Urban Regeneration seeks to create a skilled workforce within Kilmarnock and Ayrshire as a result of its educational and business partnership with Ayrshire College.

In 2020, an NPA qualification was founded in collaboration with The HALO Urban Regeneration, Ayrshire College and construction contractors Morrisons Construction, with students able to access work placements on site during the construction process site.

== Board of management ==
Marie Macklin CBE, founder and executive chair The current board composition of the HALO Urban Regeneration consists of:

- Marie Macklin CBE, Founder and executive chair
- Derek Weir, Managing director
- Drew Macklin, Project director
- Bill Stafford, non-executive director
- Jim McMahon, non-executive director

== See also ==
- Kilmarnock
- East Ayrshire
- Johnnie Walker, the site on which the HALO Urban Regeneration has been constructed
- Economy of Scotland
- Kilmarnock College
- Ayrshire College
