= The KLIN Group =

Scottish property development company

- Logo (1988–present)

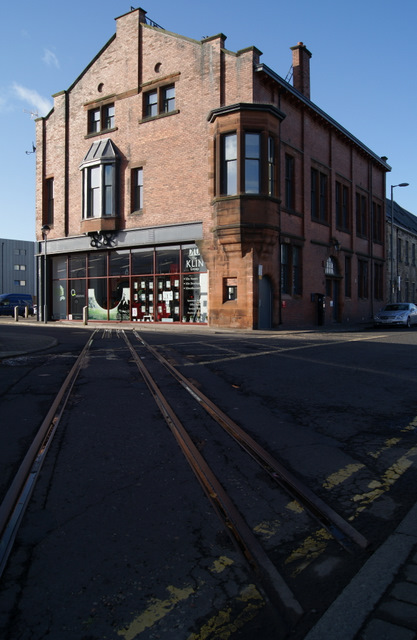
- KLIN Group HQ is housed at Barclay House in the Bonnyton area of Kilmarnock
- Type: Privately owned Property Investment and Development Company
- Industry: Property development, regeneration
- Founded: October 18, 1988; 37 years ago in Kilmarnock, Scotland
- Founder: John Dick
- Headquarters: Barclay House, Bonnyton, Kilmarnock, Scotland
- Area served: Scotland
- Key people: John Dick (founder); Marie Macklin CBE (former CEO); Drew Macklin (current director)
- Products: Property development, regeneration, investment
- Revenue: £7.5 million (2017)
- Website: KLIN Group

The KLIN Group is a Scottish property development, regeneration and investment company founded in 1988 by John Dick. The companies main HQ and offices are located in the Bonnyton area of Kilmarnock, East Ayrshire at Barclay House, the former offices of Andrew Barclay Sons & Co. The company today is a second generational family business, with Dick's daughter, Marie Macklin CBE, having been CEO of the company from 2003 until 2014, at which point she sold the company to Drew Macklin. Drew Macklin currently serves as a director of the company, having been appointed to the role on 1 June 2011.

The KLIN Group has invested heavily in the regeneration of Kilmarnock town centre, including renovation and restoration work on the derelict Opera House building in John Finnie Street, having re-constructed the interior of the building following fire damage.

== History ==
The KLIN Group was founded in Kilmarnock in 1988 by construction veteran, John Dick. During the 2000s, his daughter Marie Macklin took over the running and operations of the business as chief executive officer, which saw the company focus more on property development and regeneration work within Kilmarnock and East Ayrshire. In 2003, the KLIN Group was responsible for introducing Morrisons to a 12-acre site in Kilmarnock where they created Scotland's first Morrisons superstore. The £60 million investment package included the restoration of the former Andrew Barclay Sons & Co. headquarters adjacent to the new superstore, as well as for the derelict Opera House building on John Finnie Street.

The KLIN Group was one of the first private sector investors in the regeneration of the Tollcross area of Glasgow. The company completed several brownfield housing developments in the area which led the way for further third party investment.

=== KLIN Holdings Ltd. ===
The KLIN Group now operates as KLIN Holdings Ltd., with Drew Macklin serving as a company director since 2011. KLIN Holdings was originally incorporated into The KLIN Group in 1999.

== Barclay House ==
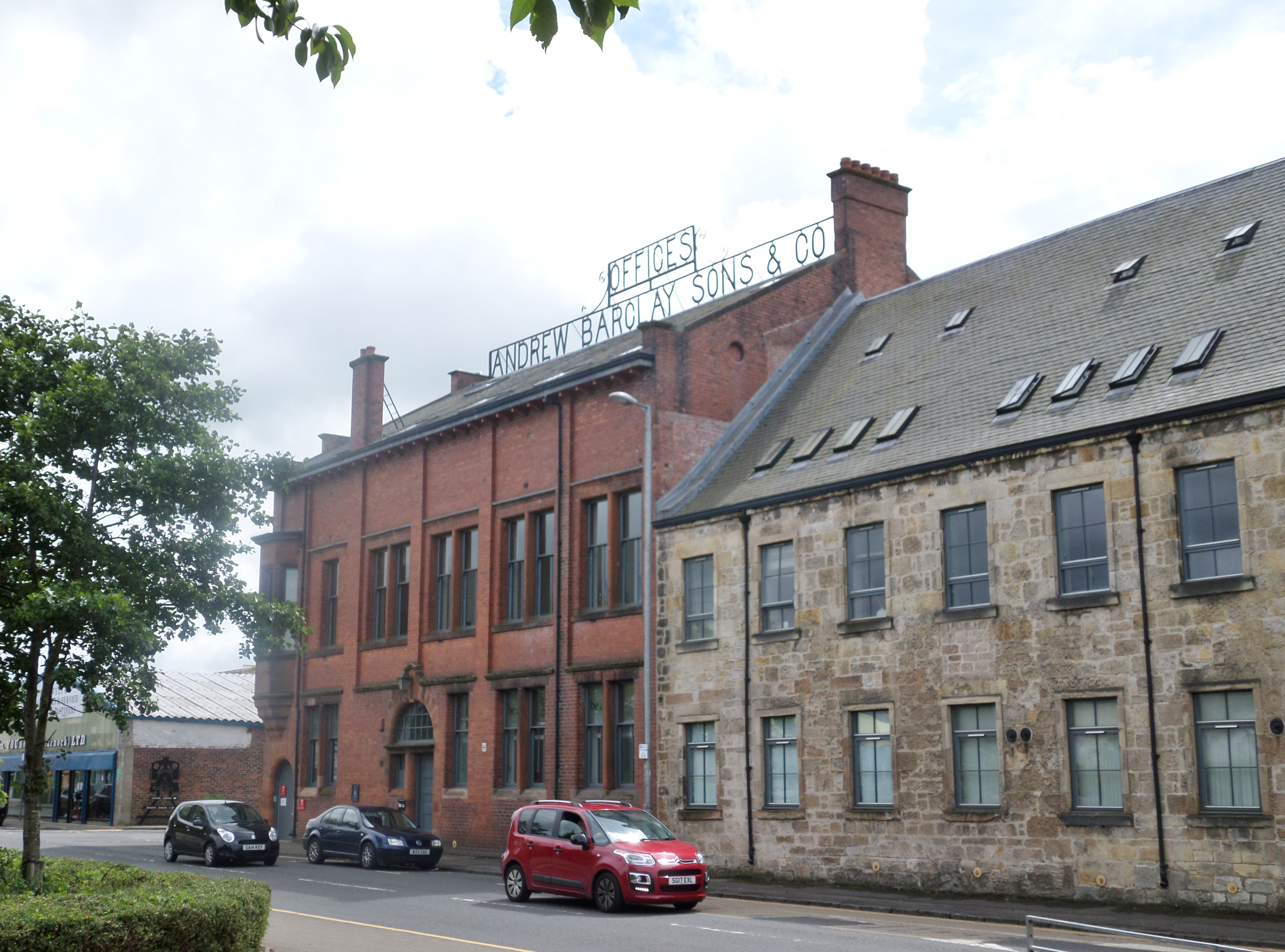
Barclay House (red bricked building) serves as the companies main HQ

The KLIN Group had undertaken extensive repair work and restoration of Barclay House, the former offices and HQ of Kilmarnock locomotive builders Andrew Barclay Sons & Co. The company developed the main office building into the HQ of the KLIN Group, as well as providing office space for other additional businesses. The connecting part to the original red-bricked building had been developed into accommodation, with several apartments available for rent and lease available.

== Services ==
=== Projects and developments ===
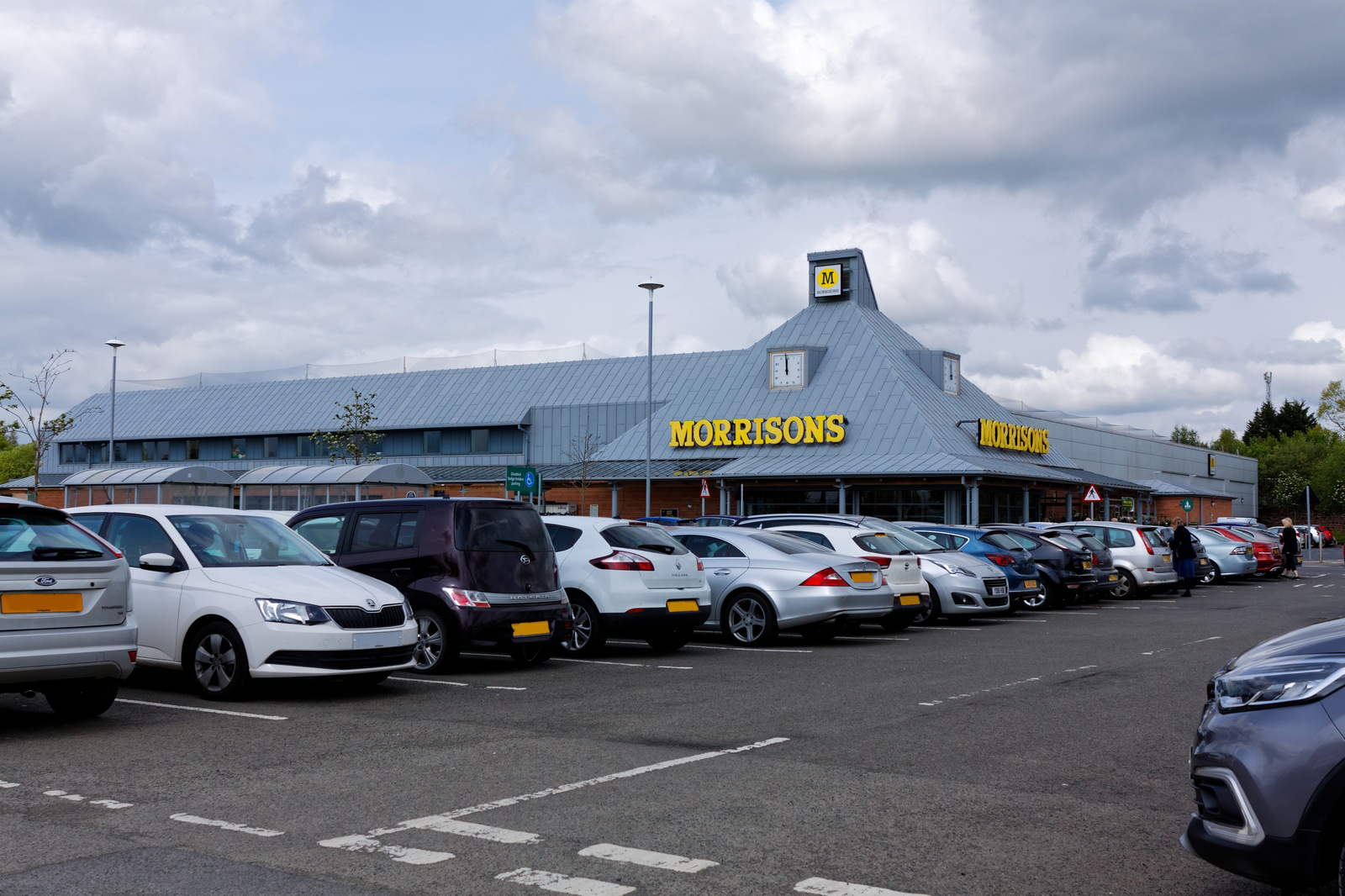
The KLIN Group was responsible for the first Morrisons superstore in Scotland, opening in Kilmarnock in 2003

The KLIN Group has been responsible for the regeneration and construction of various large scale projects including:

- Morrison Supermarket Kilmarnock
- Opera House (now East Ayrshire Council offices)
- Barclay House (KLIN Group headquarters)
- Tollcross
- Glebe Court
- Paisley Road
- Nursery Gardens
- Townhead Gardens
- Ludovic Court

=== Subsidiaries ===
The KLIN Group owns and controls various subsidiaries from the main KLIN Group company including:

- KLIN Homes - House Builders
- KLINCribs - Property Letting
- KLIN Holdings - Investments and land
- KLIN Developments - Mixed use developments
- KLIN Contracts - Construction
- KLIN Retail - Retail developments

== See also ==
- The HALO Urban Regeneration
- Kilmarnock
