= James Hamilton Academy =

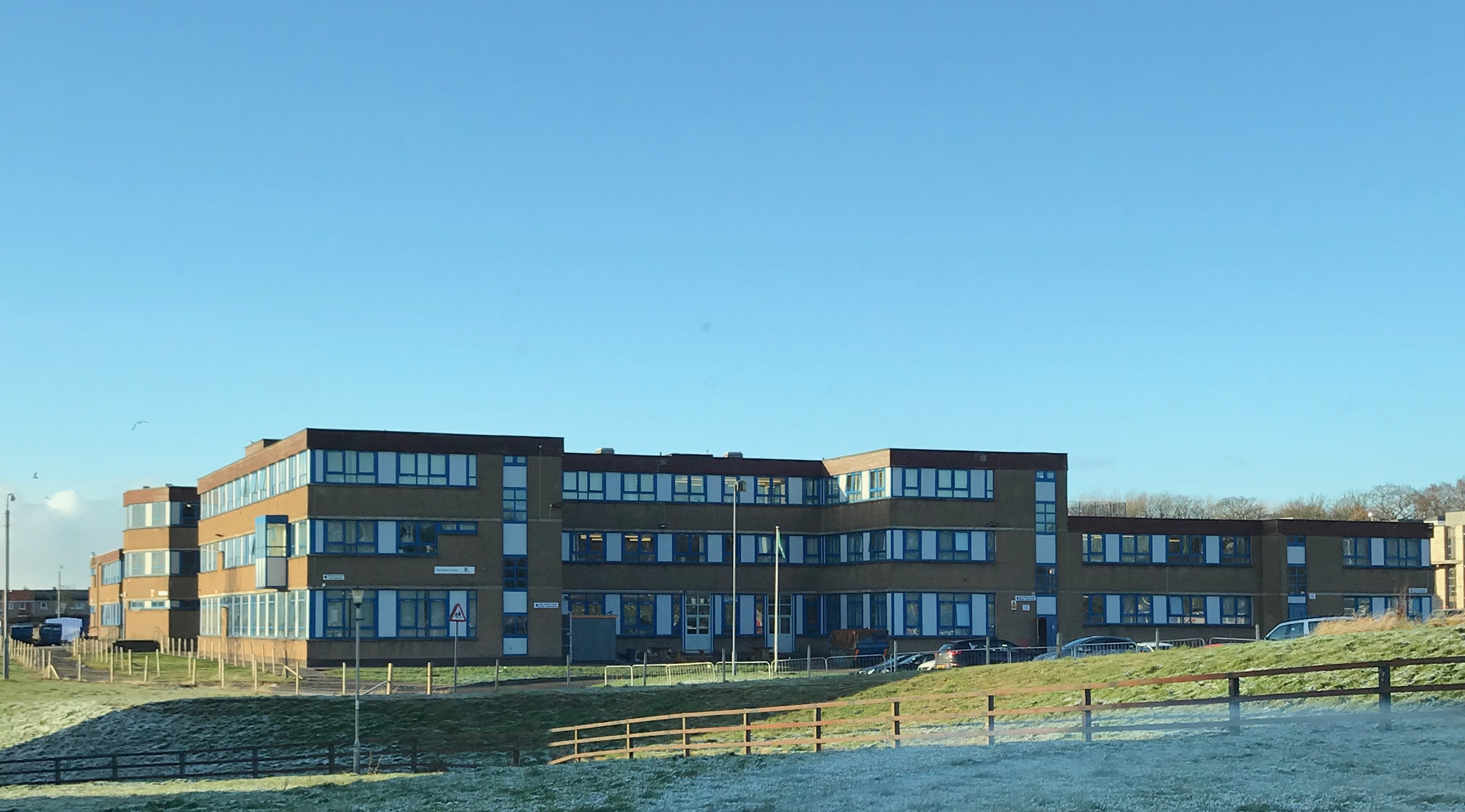

Location
- Sutherland Drive; Kilmarnock, East Ayrshire, KA3 7DF; Scotland

Information
- Type: Non-denominational secondary school
- Motto: Ad Altiora
- Established: 16 September 1977
- Closed: 29 March 2018
- Local authority: East Ayrshire Council
- Head Teacher: Janis Teale
- Staff: 50 FTE
- Gender: Mixed
- Enrolment: 635
- Houses: Bruce, Douglas, Murray, Wallace
- Colours: Blue and white
- Website: http://www.jameshamiltonacademy.co.uk/

James Hamilton Academy was a six-year non-denominational, co-educational, comprehensive school in Scotland. The school was officially opened on 16 September 1977. It closed on 29 March 2018 and was incorporated into Kilmarnock Academy.

The final school roll in March 2018 was 635 pupils, despite a capacity for 1050 pupils. Pupils from New Farm Primary School, Silverwood Primary School, and Onthank Primary School would normally have transitioned at the end of Primary 7 to S1 at James Hamilton Academy. The school motto was Ad Altiora, Latin for "To higher heights"

== Accommodation ==
The accommodation was in Sutherland Drive, (New Farm Loch), Kilmarnock, East Ayrshire, consisting of four blocks (Block A to Block D) with adjacent playing fields.

Block A - Social Subjects and Modern Languages.

Block B - Admin offices, Library, Staff Room, Senior Common Room and Home Economics.

Block C - Mathematics, English, Sciences, Technical Education, Art and Design and Business Education and IT

Block D - Music, Physical Education and General Purpose Hall.

There was also a primary school (New Farm Primary School), and a nursery (New Farm Early Childhood Centre) situated on the lower level and a small portion of the upper level of Block A.

Demolition of the school was completed in November 2018.

== Kilmarnock Academy merger ==
In October 2013 plans were approved by East Ayrshire Council to build a new, age 3 to age 18 campus, including a new build secondary school, which would open with effect from the start of the 2017/2018 academic session in August 2017, or as soon as possible thereafter. This new campus would contain a merger of Kilmarnock Academy and James Hamilton Academy, a merger of New Farm Primary School and Silverwood Primary School, and an Early Childhood Centre, as well as community facilities.

In April 2014 plans were approved by East Ayrshire to include Gaelic education provision for Early Years, Primary and Secondary to be merged to form a single establishment within the new 3-18 campus on Sutherland Drive, Kilmarnock, with effect from the start of the 2017/2018 academic session in March 2018, or as soon as possible thereafter.

The campus would be named 'William McIlvanney Campus', after the Scottish author. The primary school and Early Childhood Centre would be called 'James Hamilton Primary School' and 'James Hamilton Early Childhood Centre' and the academy would be called 'Kilmarnock Academy'. The campus was handed over to East Ayrshire Council on 30 March 2018 and opened to pupils on 18 April 2018.

== See also ==
- Education in Scotland
