= William Walker (Scottish cricketer) =

Scottish cricketer

Personal information
- Full name: William Norman Walker
- Born: 23 January 1894; Greenock, Renfrewshire, Scotland
- Died: 14 September 1960 (aged 66); Greenock, Renfrewshire, Scotland
- Batting: Right-handed
- Bowling: Right-arm medium
- Relatives: John Walker (brother)

Domestic team information
- Years: Team
- 1922–1925: Scotland

Career statistics
Competition	First-class
Matches	6
Runs scored	200
Batting average	18.18
100s/50s	–/1
Top score	58
Balls bowled	938
Wickets	18
Bowling average	27.88
5 wickets in innings	–
10 wickets in match	–
Best bowling	4/55
Catches/stumpings	5/–
- Source: Cricinfo, 27 October 2022

William Norman Walker MC DL JP (23 January 1894 – 14 September 1960) was a Scottish first-class cricketer and cricket administrator, and an officer in the British Army.

Walker was born at Greenock in January 1894 and was educated at The Glasgow Academy. He served in the British Army during the First World War, being commissioned as a second lieutenant in the Royal Field Artillery in August 1914, with promotion to lieutenant following in August 1915. He was awarded the Military Cross in 1917, for conspicuous gallantry and devotion to duty in endeavouring to extinguish blazing ammunition which had been set alight by heavy howitzer shelling. Walker was made second in command of a battalion in March 1918, at which point he was made an acting captain; he relinquished his acting rank in August 1918 and ceased to be employed in the army in May 1919. He remained commissioned until September 1922, when he resigned his commission and was granted the rank of captain.

A club cricketer for Greenock, he made his debut in first-class cricket for Scotland against Ireland at Glasgow in 1922. He played first-class cricket for Scotland until 1925, making six appearances. Playing as an all-rounder in the Scottish side, Walker scored 200 runs in his six matches at an average of 18.18; he made one half century score of 58. With his right-arm medium pace bowling, he took 18 wickets at a bowling average of 27.88, with best figures of 4 for 55.

Walker returned to military service in the Second World War with the Territorial Army. He was appointed a deputy lieutenant of Renfrewshire in July 1945. Walker was appointed honorary colonel of the 328 Medium Regiment (Highland) in July 1947, before relinquishing his commission in December of the same year. Walker served as the president of the Scottish Cricket Union the following year. He relinquished his appointment as honorary colonel in July 1950. A justice of the peace for Renfrewshire, Walker died at Renfrew in September 1960. His brother, John, was also a first-class cricketer. Walker was a direct descendant of Johnnie Walker, the founder of the Scotch whiskey brand of the same name.
