= George Paterson Walker =

- Born: 1864
- Died: 1926 (aged 61–62)
- Occupation: Businessman
- Relatives: Alexander Walker II (brother)

George Paterson Walker (1864 – 1926) was a Scottish businessman who was the grandson of John ‘Johnnie’ Walker of the whisky brand.

== Biography ==
He was the oldest son of whisky maker Alexander Walker and took over the family business' London office in 1888, overseeing distribution and marketing.

After their father's death in 1889, his brother Alexander stepped into the production and blending role, eventually creating Johnnie Walker Old Highland (white label) and Special Old Highland (red label) (adding them to the Extra Special Old Highland (black Label) created by their father in 1865).

In 1909 George saw the introduction of the Striding Man logo. And the rebranding of the whisky blends as Johnnie Walker White Label, Red Label and Black Label.

== The Striding Man ==
George had wanted to create an advertising device that would be instantly recognisable to customers. The solution emerged during lunch one day with cartoonist of the time, Tom Browne. In response to the challenge, Browne drew the first Striding Man then and there on the back of a menu in the restaurant. The words "Born 1820, still going strong" were added.

1820 was year George's grandfather John purchased a grocery and spirits shop in Kilmarnock, Ayrshire, Scotland. The blend that became Black Label was actually introduced in 1865 by George's father.

== Sources ==
Scotch Whisky: A Liquid History by Charles MacLean. ©2003 Charles MacLean & Cassell Illustrated. ISBN 1-84403-078-4
