= John Walker (Scottish cricketer) =

Scottish cricketer

Personal information
- Full name: John Barnhill Walker
- Born: 30 October 1883; Greenock, Renfrewshire, Scotland
- Died: 21 November 1953 (aged 70); Bearsden, Dunbartonshire, Scotland
- Batting: Right-handed
- Relatives: William Walker (brother)

Domestic team information
- Years: Team
- 1912: Scotland

Career statistics
Competition	First-class
Matches	2
Runs scored	45
Batting average	11.25
100s/50s	–/–
Top score	34
Catches/stumpings	3/–
- Source: Cricinfo, 26 October 2022

John Barnhill Walker (30 October 1883 – 21 November 1953) was a Scottish first-class cricketer and businessman. His brother, William, was also a first-class cricketer.

== Biography ==
Walker was born at Greenock in October 1883 and was educated at the Glasgow Collegiate. He played club cricket with success for Greenock, scoring 169 runs against the West of Scotland in 1912, in addition to captaining the club. Walker played two first-class cricket matches for Scotland in 1912, against the touring South Africans at Glasgow, and Ireland at Dublin. He scored 45 runs in his two matches, with a highest score of 34.

Walker served in the Renfrewshire Volunteer Regiment during the First World War, being commissioned as a temporary second lieutenant in April 1918. Walker later became a senior director at John Walker and Co. (Sugar Refiners) and was a direct descendant of its founder, Johnnie Walker. Besides his cricketing and business interests, he also played rugby football for Greenock Wanderers RFC. He died in November 1953 at Bearsden, Dunbartonshire.
