= Alexander Walker II =

Scottish businessman

- Born: 1869
- Died: 1950 (aged 80–81)
- Occupation: Businessman
- Relatives: George Paterson Walker (brother)

Sir Alexander Walker II (1869 – 1950) was a Scottish businessman who was the younger grandson of John 'Johnnie' Walker of the whisky brand. He and his brother, George Paterson Walker, took the control of the company after the death of their father Alexander Walker in 1889.

== Biography ==
Walker was born in 1869, the son of Alexander Walker.

Alexander took his father's black labeled blend (called at the time Walker's Old Highland) and added two more blends—Old Highland (white label), Special Old Highland (red label)—to the line. At the same time the original blend was renamed Extra Special Old Highland (black label)

In 1909 Alexander's brother George oversaw the creation of the Johnnie Walker Striding Man logo, and the rebranding of the lines as Johnnie Walker White Label, Johnnie Walker Red Label, and Johnnie Walker Black Label.

The brothers discontinued White Label during World War I to move the brand more upscale, and in 1932 Alexander introduced his last blend, Johnnie Walker Swing.

Sir Alexander was knighted in 1920.

Walker retired in 1940. On his death in 1950, he left all of his blending notes to the now public company. In the 1990s John Walker and Sons introduced Johnnie Walker Gold Label based in large part on those notes.
