= Alexander Walker (1837–1889) =

Scottish whisky distiller

Sir Alexander Walker
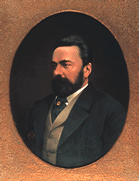
- Alexander Walker portrait, date unknown
- Born: Alexander Walker; 10 February 1837; Kilmarnock, Scotland
- Died: 16 July 1889 (aged 52); Crosby Tower, Troon, South Ayrshire, Scotland
- Occupations: Master blender; industrialist
- Children: 2 (George and Alexander)
- Parent(s): John ‘Johnnie’ Walker; Elizabeth Pervis

Sir Alexander Walker (10 February 1837 – 16 July 1889) was a Scottish industrialist who was the son of John 'Johnnie' Walker of the whisky brand. He inherited the company in 1857 and expanded its business, exporting whisky throughout the British Empire.

== Biography ==
=== Early life ===
Walker was born 1837, in Kilmarnock, Scotland, the son of John ‘Johnnie’ Walker.

=== Old Highland Whisky ===
In 1867 he registered Old Highland Whisky, one of the earliest brands to be trademarked. From that time it has had the now famous slanted black and gold label. In the late 1870s he switched to the distinctive square bottle design.

=== 1889 onwards ===
Upon his death in 1889, he left the business to his sons George Paterson Walker and Alexander Walker II.

George ran marketing and distribution through the London office. Alexander oversaw production, blending, and became an industry spokesman and whisky magnate.

== Sources ==
Scotch Whisky: A Liquid History by Charles MacLean. ©2003 Charles MacLean & Cassell Illustrated. ISBN 1-84403-078-4
