= Johnnie Walker =

Brand of Scotch whisky

Coordinates: 55°36′52″N 4°30′04″W

- Type: Scotch whisky
- Manufacturer: Diageo
- Origin: Kilmarnock, Scotland
- Introduced: 1820; 206 years ago
- Alcohol by volume: 40%
- Website: johnniewalker.com

Johnnie Walker is a brand of Scotch whisky produced by Diageo in Scotland. It was established in the Scottish burgh of Kilmarnock in 1820, and continued to be produced and bottled at the town's Hill Street plant, once the world's largest bottling plant, until its closure in 2012, a decision announced by Diageo in 2009 which would bring the 190-year association between the brand and Kilmarnock to an end.

The brand was first established by grocer John Walker, a native of Kilmarnock, who originally established the business as a grocery shop in 1820, with his son Alexander "Alec" Walker and grandson Alexander Walker II, being largely responsible for establishing the whisky as a favoured brand. It is the world's highest selling Scotch whisky,, with reported annual sales of 20.3 million cases, or 182,700,000 L (40,200,000 imp gal; 48,300,000 US gal), in 2025.

== History ==
=== John Walker, founder ===
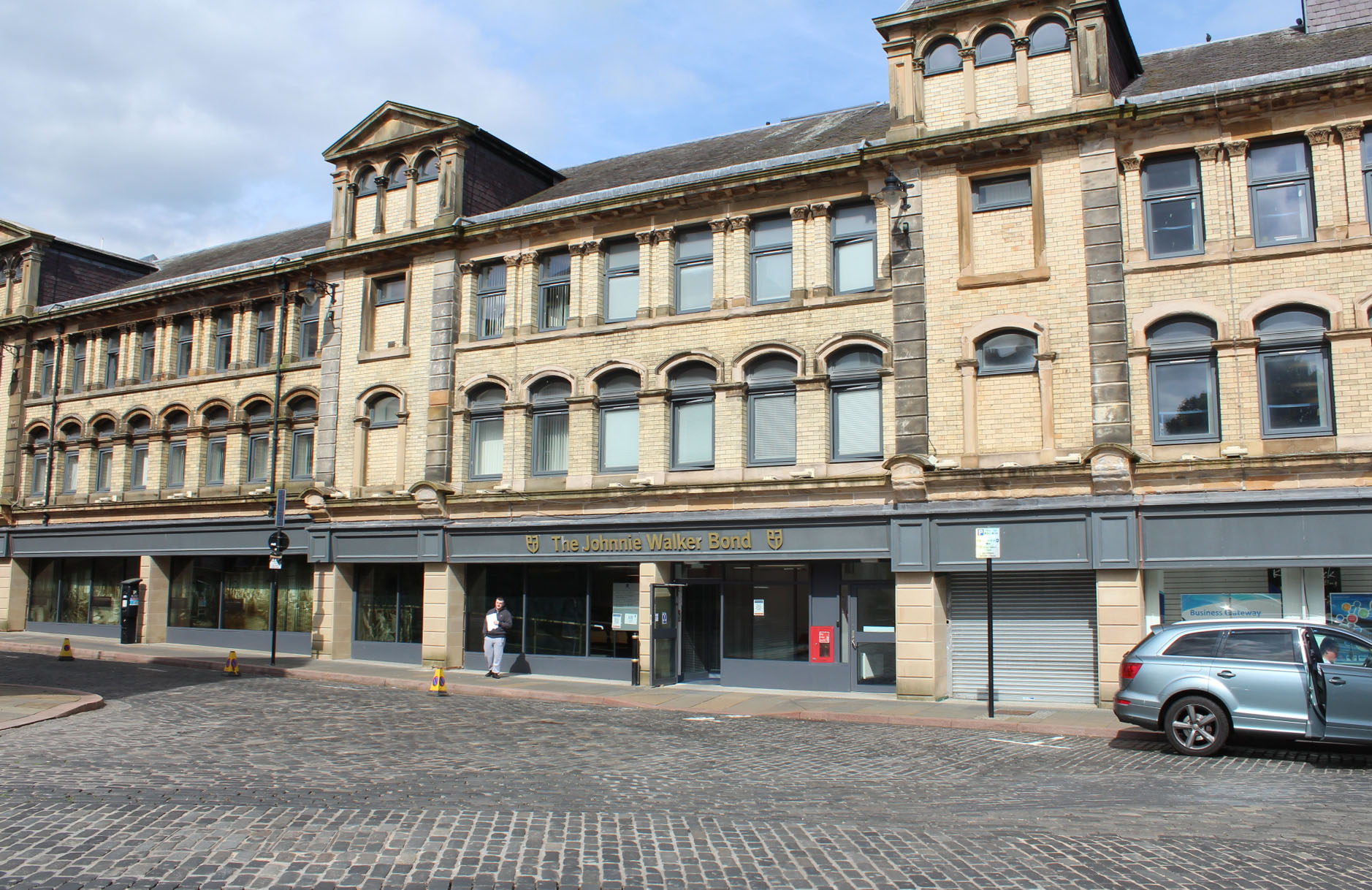
The "Johnnie Walker Bond" in Kilmarnock operated until the opening of a new plant on Hill Street in Kilmarnock.

John Walker was born on 25 July 1805. His farmer father died in 1819, and the family sold the farm. Their trustees invested the proceeds, £417, in an Italian warehouse, grocery, and wine and spirits shop on the High Street in Kilmarnock, Ayrshire, Scotland. Walker managed the grocery, wine, and spirits segment as a teenager in 1820. The Excise Act 1823 relaxed strict laws on distillation of whisky and reduced, by a considerable amount, the extremely heavy taxes on the distillation and sale of whisky. By 1825, Walker, a teetotaller, was selling spirits, including rum, brandy, gin, and whisky.

In short order, he switched to dealing mainly in whisky. Since blending of grain whiskies with malt whiskies was still banned, he sold both blended malt whiskies and grain whiskies. They were sold as made-to-order whiskies, blended to meet specific customer requirements, because he did not have any brand of his own. He began using his name on labels years later, selling a blended malt as Walker's Kilmarnock Whisky. John Walker died in 1857.

=== Death of Walker and takeover by son ===
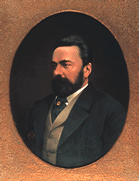
Alexander Walker, son of John Walker, inherited the business following his father's death.

The brand became popular, but after Walker's death it was his son Alexander 'Alec' Walker and grandson Alexander Walker II who were largely responsible for establishing the whisky as a favoured brand. The Spirits Act 1860 legalised the blending of grain whiskies with malt whiskies and ushered in the modern era of blended Scotch whisky. Blended Scotch whisky, lighter and sweeter in character, was more accessible, and much more marketable to a wider audience. Andrew Usher of Edinburgh, was the first to produce a blended whisky, but the Walkers followed in due course.

Alexander Walker had introduced the brand's signature square bottle in 1860. This meant more bottles fitting the same space and fewer broken bottles. The other identifying characteristic of the Johnnie Walker bottle was – and still is – the label, which, since that year, is applied at an angle of 24 degrees upwards left to right and allows text to be made larger and more visible. This also allowed consumers to identify it at a distance. One major factor in his favour was the arrival of a railway in Kilmarnock, carrying goods to merchant ships travelling the world. Thanks to Alec's business acumen, sales of Walker's Kilmarnock reached 100,000 gallons (450,000 litres) per year by 1862.

In 1865, Alec created Johnnie Walker's first commercial blend and called it Old Highland Whisky, before registering it as such in 1867.

Under John Walker, whisky sales represented eight percent of the firm's income; by the time Alexander was ready to pass on the company to his own sons, that figure had increased to between 90 and 95 percent.

=== Expansion and growth ===
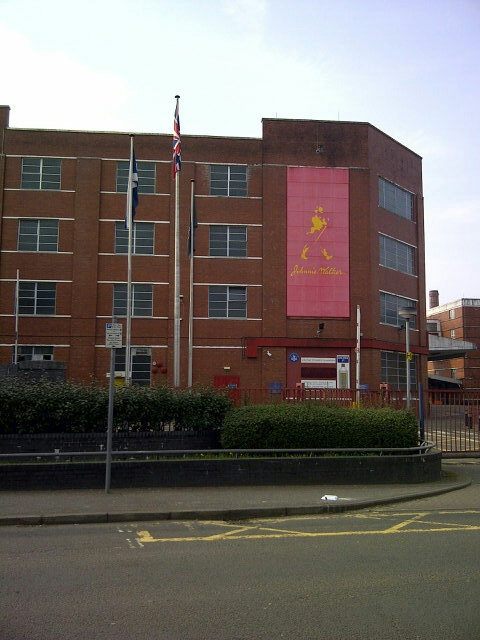
The Hill Street plant in Kilmarnock, a few days following closure in 2012. The plant was the largest in the world at its time of opening.

In 1893, Cardhu distillery was purchased by the Walkers to reinforce the stocks of one of the Johnnie Walker blends' key malt whiskies. This move took the Cardhu single malt out of the market and made it the exclusive preserve of the Walkers. Cardhu's output became the heart of the Old Highland Whisky and after the rebranding of 1909, the prime single malt in Johnnie Walker Red and Black Labels.

From 1906 to 1909, John's grandsons George and Alexander II expanded the line and had three blended whiskies in the market, Old Highland at 5 years old, Special Old Highland at 9 years old, and Extra Special Old Highland at 12 years old. These three brands had the standard Johnnie Walker labels, the only difference being their colours: white, red, and black, respectively. They were commonly referred to in public by the colours of their labels. In 1909, as part of a rebranding that saw the introduction of the Striding Man, a mascot used to the present day that was created by cartoonist Tom Browne, the company re-branded their blends to match the common colour names. The Old Highland was renamed Johnnie Walker White Label and made at 6 years old, the Special Old Highland became Johnnie Walker Red Label at 10 years old, and Extra Special Old Highland was renamed Johnnie Walker Black Label, remaining 12 years old.

Sensing an opportunity to expand the scale and variety of their brands, Walker acquired interests in Coleburn distillery in 1915, quickly followed by Clynelish Distillery Co. and Dailuaine-Talisker Co. in 1916. This ensured a steady supply of single-malt whisky from the Cardhu, Coleburn, Clynelish, Talisker, and Dailuaine distilleries. In 1923, Walker bought Mortlach distillery, in furtherance of their strategy. Most of their output was used in Johnnie Walker blends, whose burgeoning popularity required increasingly vast volumes of single malts.

Johnnie Walker White was dropped during World War I. In 1932, Alexander II added Johnnie Walker Swing to the line, the name originating from the unusual shape of the bottle, which allowed it to rock back and forth.

The company joined Distillers Company in 1925. Distillers Company was acquired by Guinness in 1986, and Guinness merged with Grand Metropolitan to form Diageo in 1997. That year saw the introduction of the blended malt, Johnnie Walker Pure Malt, renamed Johnnie Walker Green Label in 2004.

=== Closure of Kilmarnock plant ===
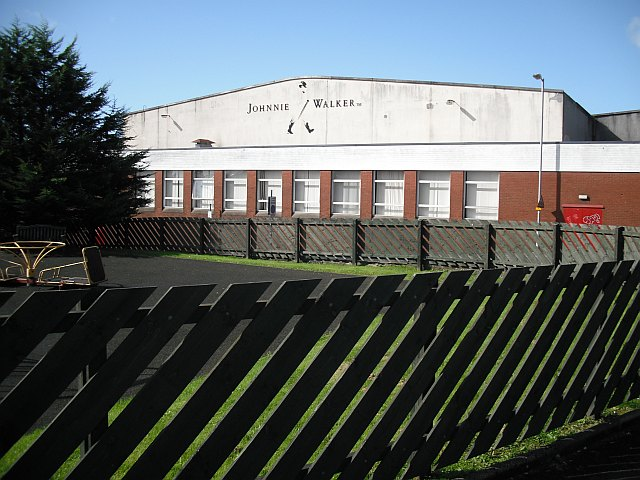
The Kilmarnock plant in 2009

In July 2009, the brand's current owners, Diageo, decided to close all operations in Kilmarnock by 2012 and transfer operations to the companies site in Leven. This was met with backlash from local people, politicians, and then-First Minister of Scotland, Alex Salmond. Despite petitions, public campaigns, and a large-scale march around Kilmarnock, Diageo proceeded with the closure. The Johnnie Walker plant in Kilmarnock closed its doors in March 2012 and the buildings were subsequently demolished a year later. The site is now occupied by the Kilmarnock campus of Ayrshire College and HALO Urban Regeneration.

=== Post–Kilmarnock ===
To replace the production capacity at Kilmarnock, the distillery in Fife became fully operational in July 2012. Cameronbridge distillery increased annual production from 66 million liters in 2007 to increase capacity to 105 million liters by 2013.

In 2018, Diageo announced plans to create a flagship whisky visitor experience on Princes Street in Edinburgh, transforming the former House of Fraser building. After extensive renovations costing around £35 million, Johnnie Walker Princes Street opened in September 2021. The venue offers an interactive journey through the heritage and craftsmanship of Johnnie Walker whisky across several floors, featuring tasting rooms and a rooftop bar with views of the city. Since opening, it has welcomed over one million visitors.

In July 2020, Johnnie Walker announced plans to release a new environmentally-friendly paper bottle set to debut in early 2021. By September 2024, the brand had developed a 700ml bottle made from 90% paper, with a thin plastic liner, for its Black Label whisky. This bottle is approximately 60% lighter than traditional glass bottles. It began trialling in the on-trade sector, including bars and restaurants, to assess its viability in real-world settings.

In October 2021, Johnnie Walker announced a new label, Jane Walker, created by the distillery's first female master blender, Dr. Emma Walker.

== Blends ==
For most of its history Johnnie Walker only offered a few blends. Since the turn of the century, there has been a spate of special and limited bottlings.

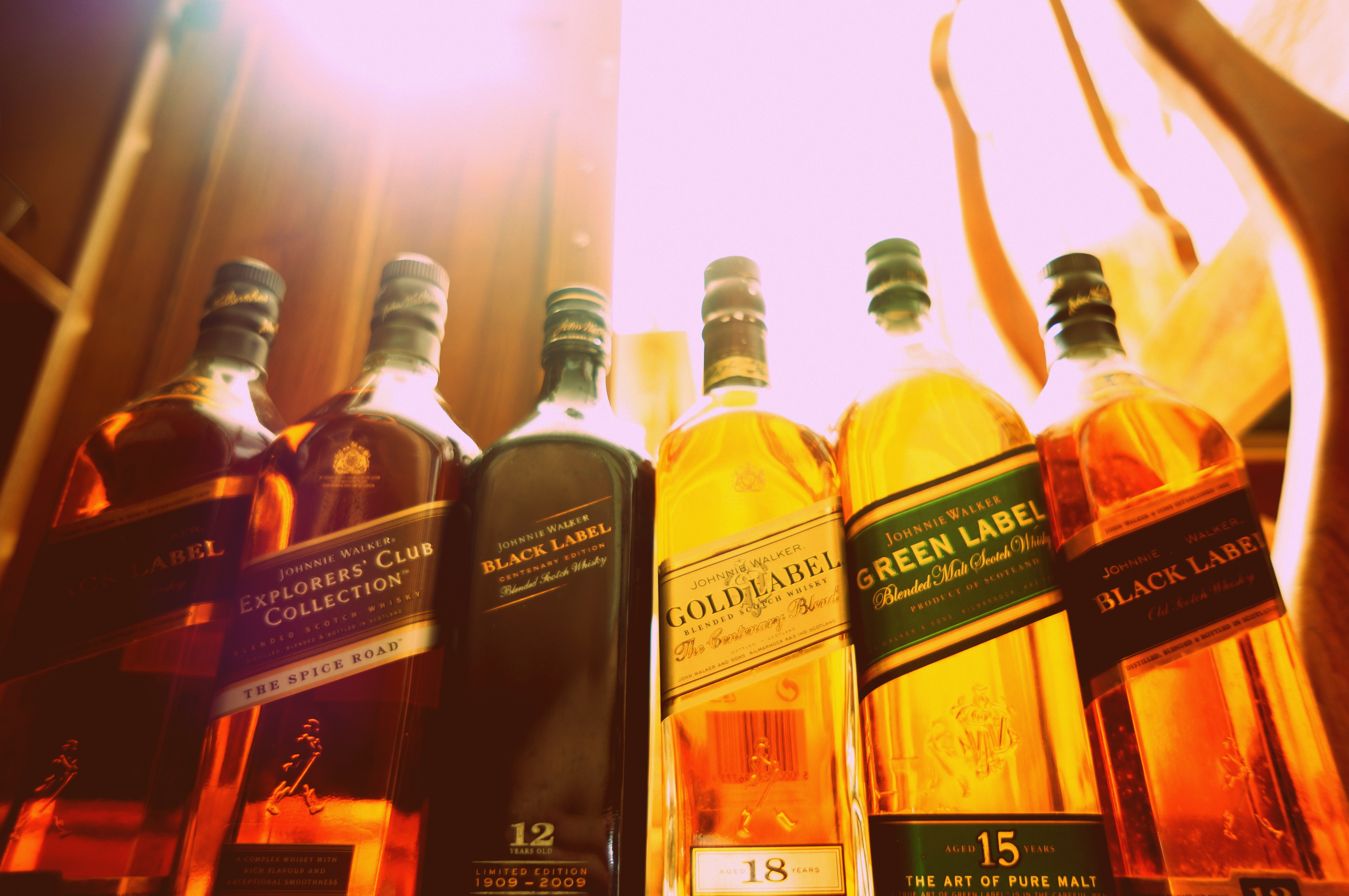
Variants of Johnnie Walker

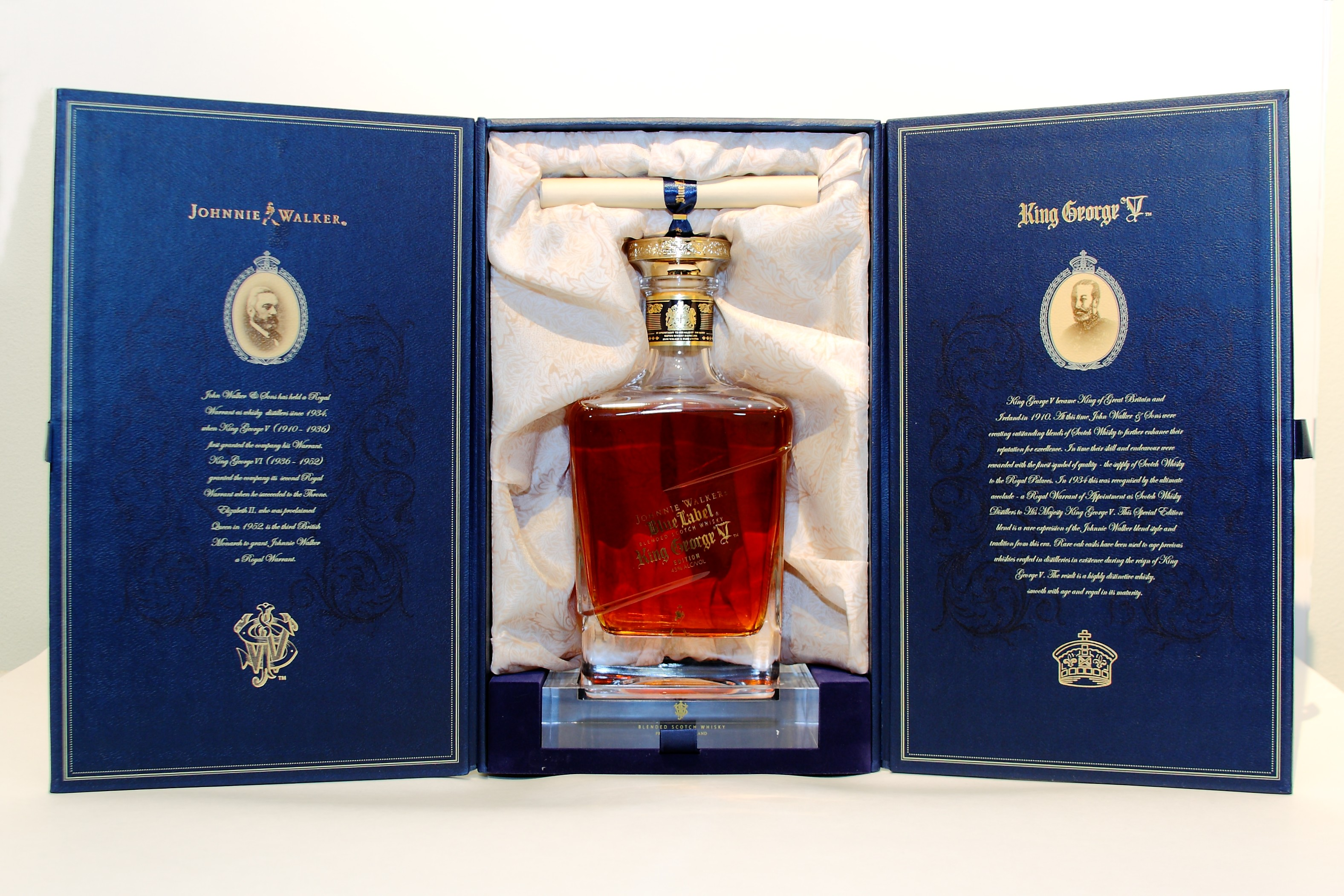
Johnnie Walker Blue Label King George V Edition, in its elaborate packaging

- Red Label: A non-age-stated blend. It has been the best selling Scotch whisky in the world since 1945. It is primarily used for making mixed drinks.
- Black Label: Aged 12 years, it is one of the world's best-selling Scotch whiskies.
- Double Black: Made available for general release in 2011 after a successful launch in travel retail. The whisky was created taking Black Label as a blueprint, adding more peaty malt whiskies to it, and maturing it in heavily charred old oak casks.
- Johnnie Walker Swing: Supplied in a distinctive bottle whose irregular bottom allows it to rock back and forth. This type of bottle design was originally used aboard sailing ships. It was Alexander Walker II's last blend: it features a high proportion of Speyside malts, complemented by malts from the northern Highlands and Islay.
- Green Label: First introduced in 1997 as Johnnie Walker Pure Malt 15 Year Old, it was renamed Johnnie Walker Green Label in 2004. Green Label is a blended malt whisky, meaning it is made by mixing single malts with no grain whisky added. All whiskies used are a minimum of 15 years old. Diageo discontinued Green Label globally in 2012 (except for Taiwan, where demand for blended malts is very strong) as part of a reconstruction of the range that saw the introduction of Gold Label Reserve and Platinum Label. The brand was reintroduced in 2015 and is again globally available.
- Gold Label Reserve: Johnnie Walker Gold Label was introduced in 1995 as a premium blended Scotch whisky. It was inspired by Alexander Walker's Centenary Blend, created in 1920 to commemorate the company's 100th anniversary. This original blend was discontinued during World War II due to depleted whisky stocks. The 1995 Gold Label was crafted using Alexander's original blending notes and was initially bottled as an 18-year-old blend. In 2013, Diageo restructured the Johnnie Walker range, leading to the discontinuation of the 18-year-old Gold Label. It was replaced by Gold Label Reserve, a no-age-statement blend positioned between Black Label and the newly introduced Platinum Label.
- Johnnie Walker Aged 18 Years: Originally launched as Johnnie Walker Platinum Label in 2011 as a travel retail exclusive. It became part of the Johnnie Walker core range in 2012. In 2017, Platinum Label was rebranded as Johnnie Walker 18 Year Old, with a packaging change to a golden-brown color scheme.
- Blue Label: Johnnie Walker Blue Label first appeared in 1992 under the name Johnnie Walker Oldest. In 1994, it was rebranded as Blue Label to align with the brand's colour-coded hierarchy and to emphasise its elevated status. Johnnie Walker Blue Label is blended to re-create the character and taste of some of the earliest whisky blends created in the 19th century. It bears no age statement. Bottles are numbered serially and sold in a silk-lined box accompanied by a certificate of authenticity. It is one of the most expensive blended Scotch whiskies on the market, with prices in the range of US$174–450. Over 300 Blue Label–based Limited Editions have been released to date.

Johnnie Walker product lines, from least to most expensive
Age	1865–1905	1906–1908	1909–1920	1921–1931	1932–1991	1992–1994	1995-1997	1997–2010	2011–2013	2013–
—		Old Highland	White Label							
Not stated		Special O.H.	Red Label							
12	Walker's O.H.	Extra Sp. O.H.	Black Label							
Not stated									Double Black	
Not stated					Swing					
15								Green Label		
18							Gold Label			
Not stated										Gold Label Reserve
18									Aged 18 Years	
Not stated						Blue Label				

== Marketing ==
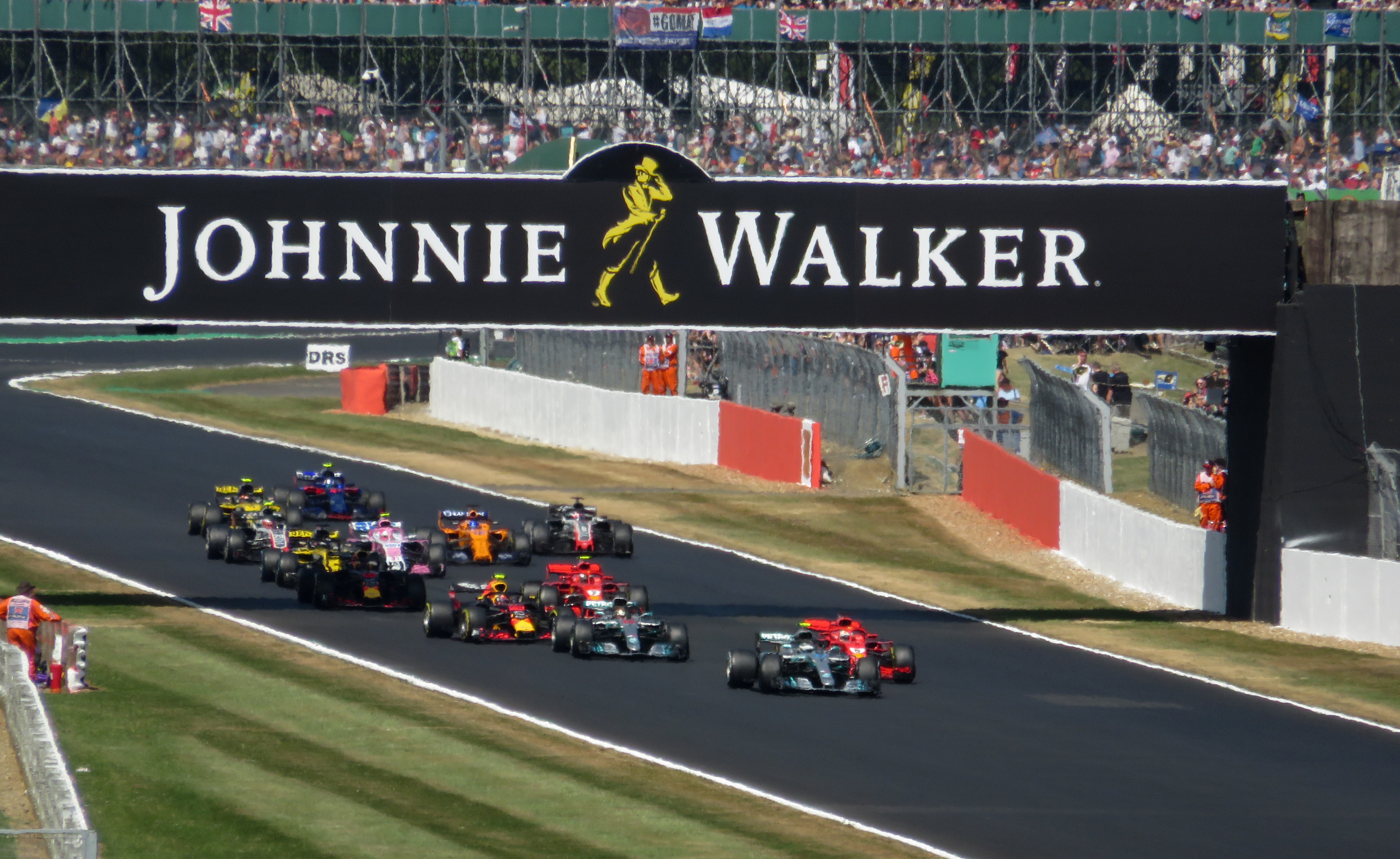
Johnnie Walker brand advertising at the 2018 British Grand Prix

In 1908, the Walkers created advertisements featuring Browne's Striding Man, using the slogan, "Johnnie Walker: Born 1820, still going strong". Photographs replaced the drawings in the 1930s, and the Striding Man was miniaturised to a coloured logo in 1939; it first appeared on the Johnnie Walker labels in 1960. In 1999, a significant shift in the brand's visual identity occurred when the "Striding Man" was flipped to face right. It had previously faced left since 1908 and was reversed as part of a "Keep Walking" campaign. The Striding Man icon was redrawn and simplified in 2015.

In 2009, the advertising agency Bartle Bogle Hegarty (BBH) created a short film, starring Robert Carlyle and directed by Jamie Rafn, titled The Man Who Walked Around the World, which outlined the history of the Johnnie Walker brand.

The Gold Label received double gold medals from the San Francisco competition in 2008 and 2009 and won a gold in 2010. Spirits ratings aggregator proof66.com, which averages scores from the San Francisco Spirits Competition, Wine Enthusiast, and others, puts the Black, Blue, Gold and Green Labels in its highest performance category ("Tier 1" Spirits). Johnnie Walker spirits have several times taken part in the Monde Selection's World Quality Selections and have received a Gold and Grand Gold Quality Award. Johnnie Walker Gold Label Reserve won the World's Best Blended—Best Scotch Blended in World Whiskies Awards 2018.

In April 2015, Diageo produced the Johnny Drama, named after the Entourage HBO series character Johnny "Drama" Chase, to promote the release of the movie version of Entourage.

In October 2018, Diageo teamed up with HBO to produce "White Walker by Johnnie Walker" whisky, inspired by the army of the undead in the TV series Game of Thrones as part of the marketing for the series' final season. Diageo then released a collection of Game of Thrones–inspired single malt whiskies, followed by two more whiskies by Johnnie Walker in mid-2019.

A flagship visitor center, The Johnnie Walker Experience, is housed in an eight floor building at 145 Princes Street in Edinburgh, Scotland. Officially known as Johnnie Walker Princes Street, it opened to the public in September 2021, following Johnnie Walker’s 200th anniversary in 2020. The attraction includes educational tasting rooms, whisky retail store, private event spaces, and a rooftop bar.

Johnnie Walker and "NTS_Radio" partnered together for a city-wide live music event in "Manchester" aptly named 'Keep Walking Live: Manchester' which ran between March 13-15th, 2026. Johnnie Walker and NTS proudly donated 100% of all net ticket proceeds to registered charity Brighter Sound Ltd, a Manchester based charity dedicated to music related residencies, workshops, courses and training for children, young people, emerging professional musicians and adult learners.

== Accolades ==
Johnnie Walker blends have received strong scores at international spirits ratings competitions and from liquor review bodies. The Green Label received a string of three double gold medals from the San Francisco World Spirits Competition between 2005 and 2007. It received a double gold in 2022, and a gold in 2023. In 2016, the Green Label won a gold medal at the International Spirits Competition, and then won a trophy in 2017 and 2019.

In 2015, the International Whisky Competition awarded Diageo the Whisky of the Year award for the John Walker & Sons King George V whisky. It was the first year that a blended whisky scored highest.

== Sponsorships ==
Johnnie Walker was the official whisky of Formula One from 2014 to early 2026 and was a sponsor for McLaren and Racing Point. Johnnie Walker is also the title namesake for the F1 Grand Prix race in Spa, Belgium.

Johnnie Walker sponsored the Johnnie Walker Classic, an Asia-Pacific golf tournament, up to 2009 and the Johnnie Walker Championship at Gleneagles, a golf tournament in Scotland up to 2013. Diageo sold the Gleneagles Hotel and Golf Course, the site of the tournament, mid-2015 to focus on its core business.

== Cultural figures ==
British prime minister Winston Churchill's favourite whisky was Johnnie Walker Red Label, which he mixed with a large amount of water and drank throughout the day.

Vanity Fair writer Christopher Hitchens was partial to Johnnie Walker Black Label cut with Perrier sparkling mineral water and referred to it as "Mr Walker's Amber Restorative".

At the height of his fame in the late 1960s, New York Jets quarterback Joe Namath said, "I like my girls blonde and my Johnnie Walker red".

A number of singers and songwriters have referenced Johnnie Walker in their works, from Amanda Marshall to ZZ Top. Elliott Smith's Oscar-nominated "Miss Misery" has the narrator "[faking] it through the day with some help from Johnnie Walker Red". Heavy metal band Black Label Society was named after Johnnie Walker Black Label whisky, as Zakk Wylde was very fond of the drink. George Thorogood name checks "Johnny [sic] Walker and his brothers Black and Red" in "I Drink Alone". The name appears also in the song "Remember to Forget" by Passenger.

Polish fictional humorous character Jakub Wędrowycz is a wordplay based on the Polish translation of "Johnnie Walker".

In the 2007 film The Man from Earth, the main character John Oldman (David Lee Smith) produces a bottle of Johnnie Walker Green Label, with his friends commenting on its quality.

In the 1982 film Blade Runner, Harrison Ford's character Rick Deckard is seen drinking Johnnie Walker Black Label, which he also drinks in the sequel, Blade Runner 2049 (2017). Coinciding with the release of Blade Runner 2049, Johnnie Walker released a "Director's Cut" edition of its Black Label, which was bottled at a higher proof.

Big Roy in An American Marriage asked Andre if he drank Johnnie Walker when they'd dried up the supper things after his drive from Atlanta.

In 2025, Sabrina Carpenter became a brand ambassador during her Short n’ Sweet tour, and her new album Man's best friend. In 2026, actor Callum Tuner of Eternity was announced as a global ambassador.

== Gallery ==
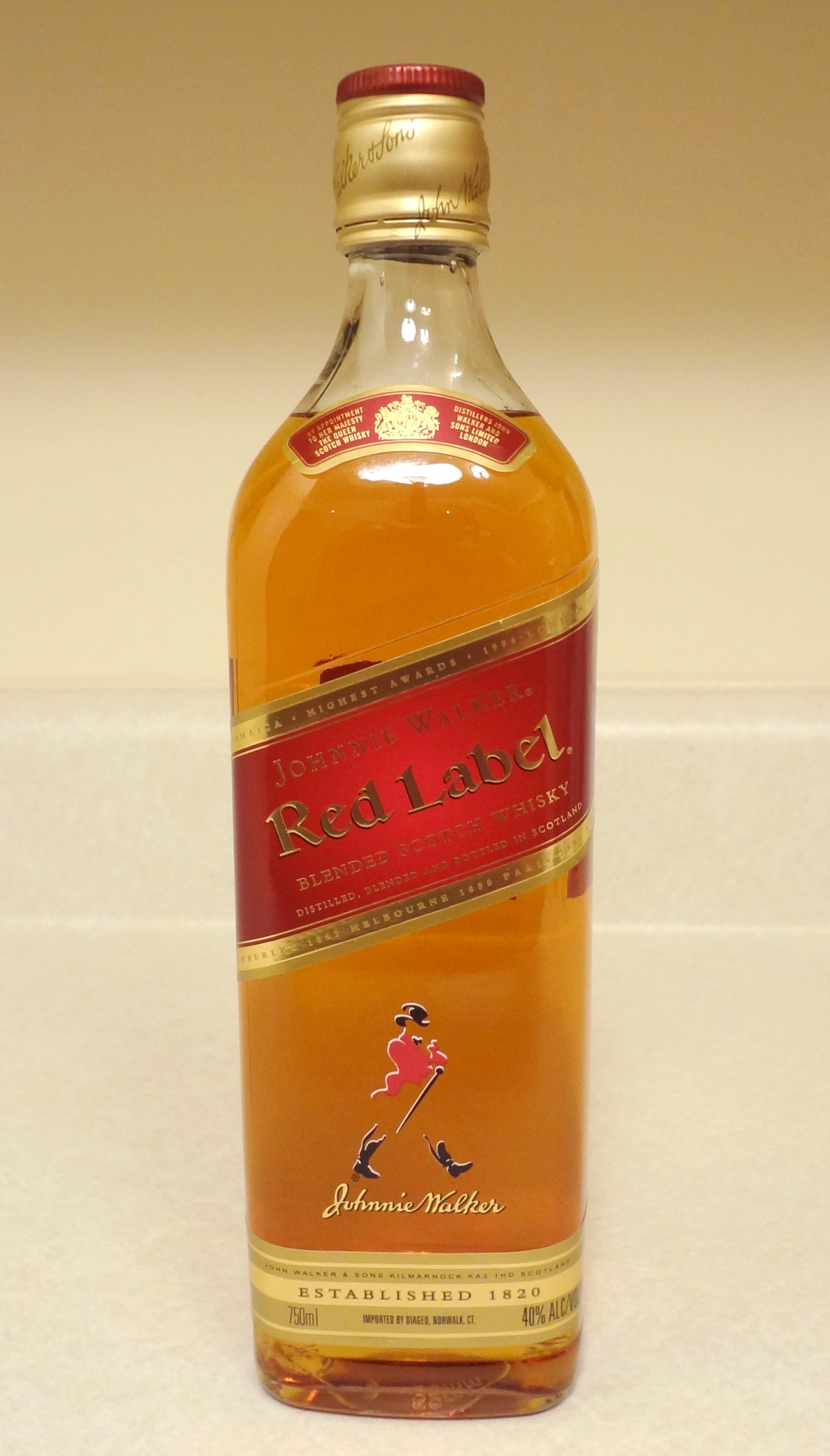
Johnnie Walker Red Label

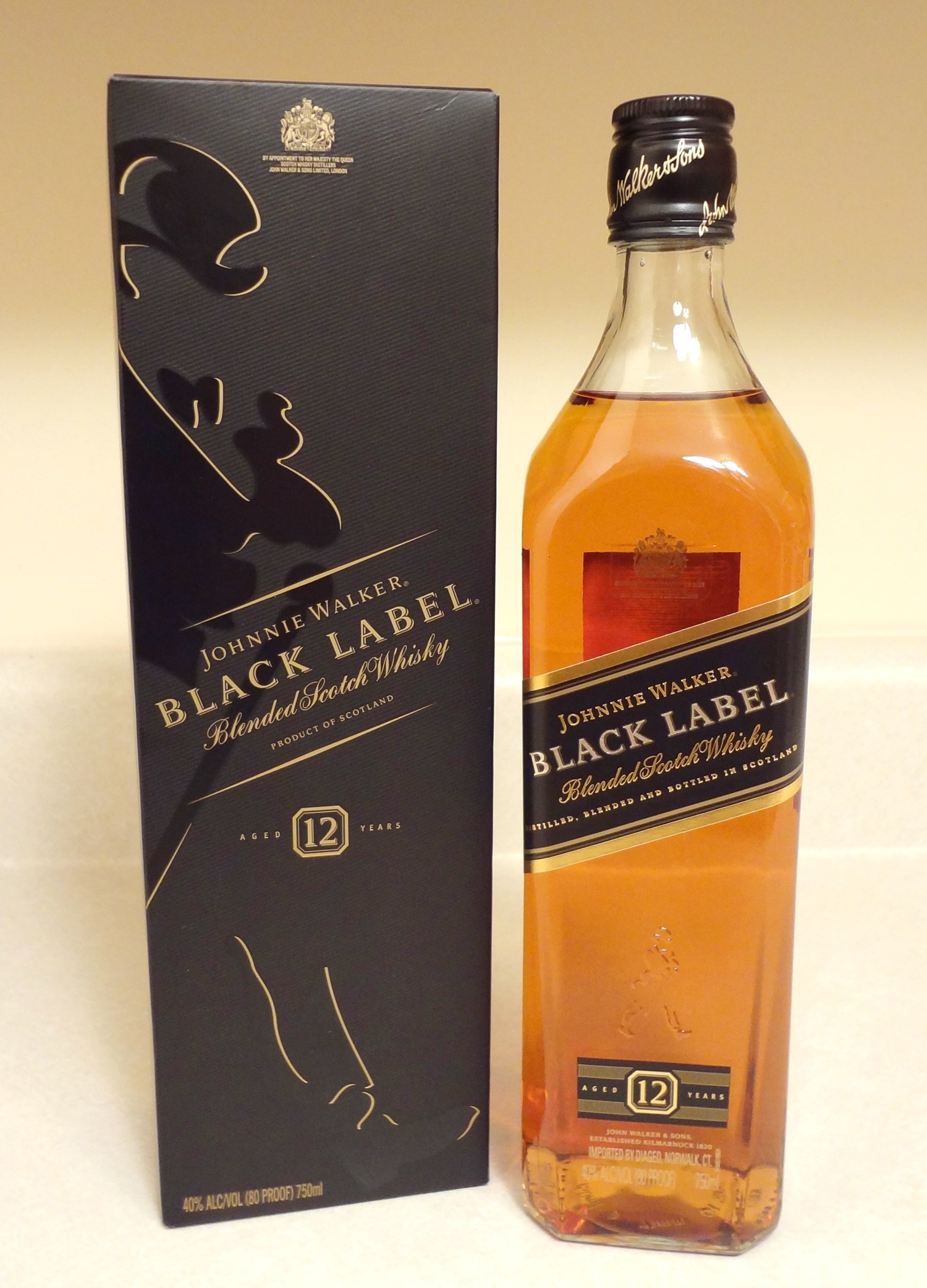
Johnnie Walker Black Label

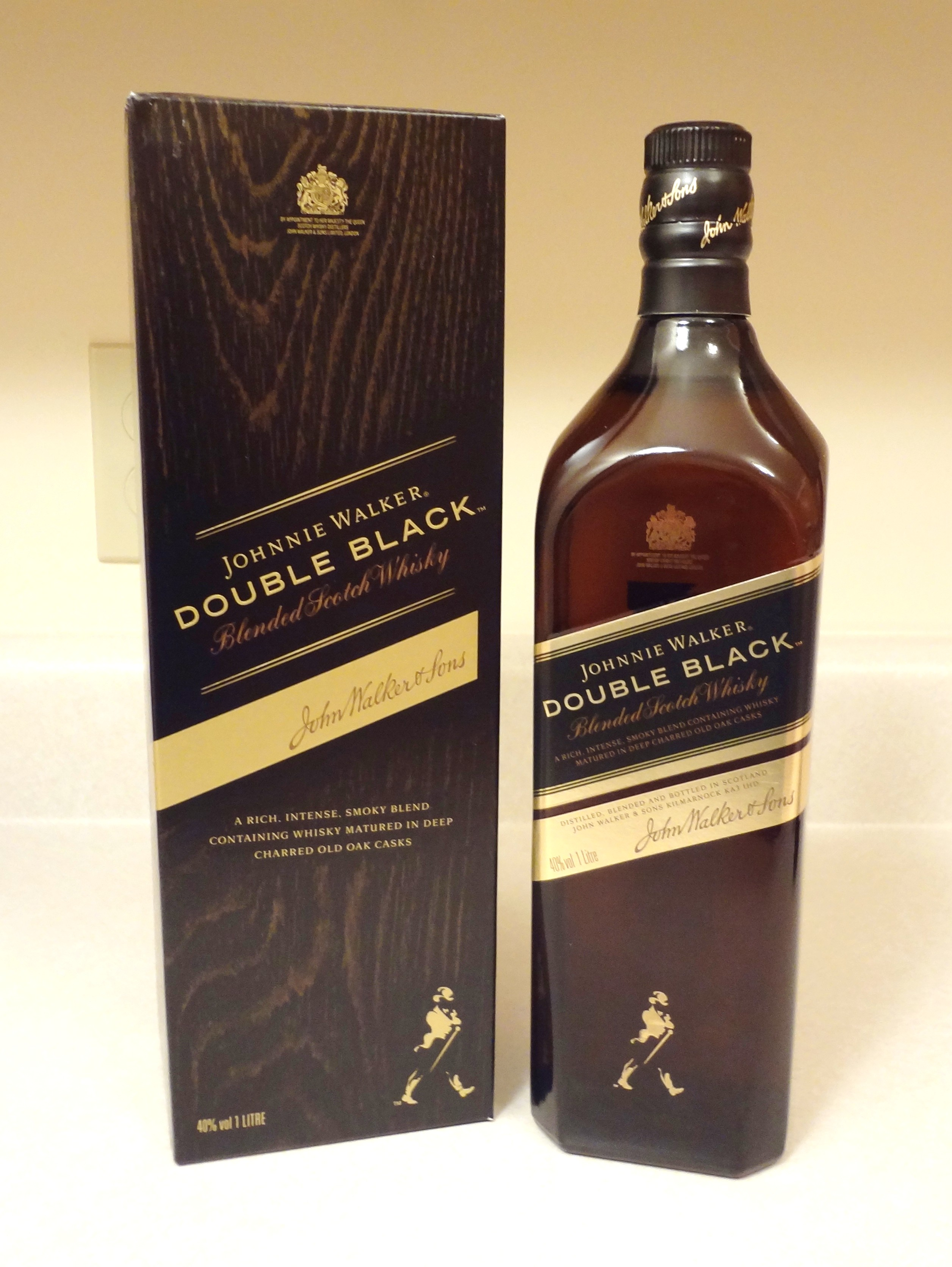
Johnnie Walker Double Black

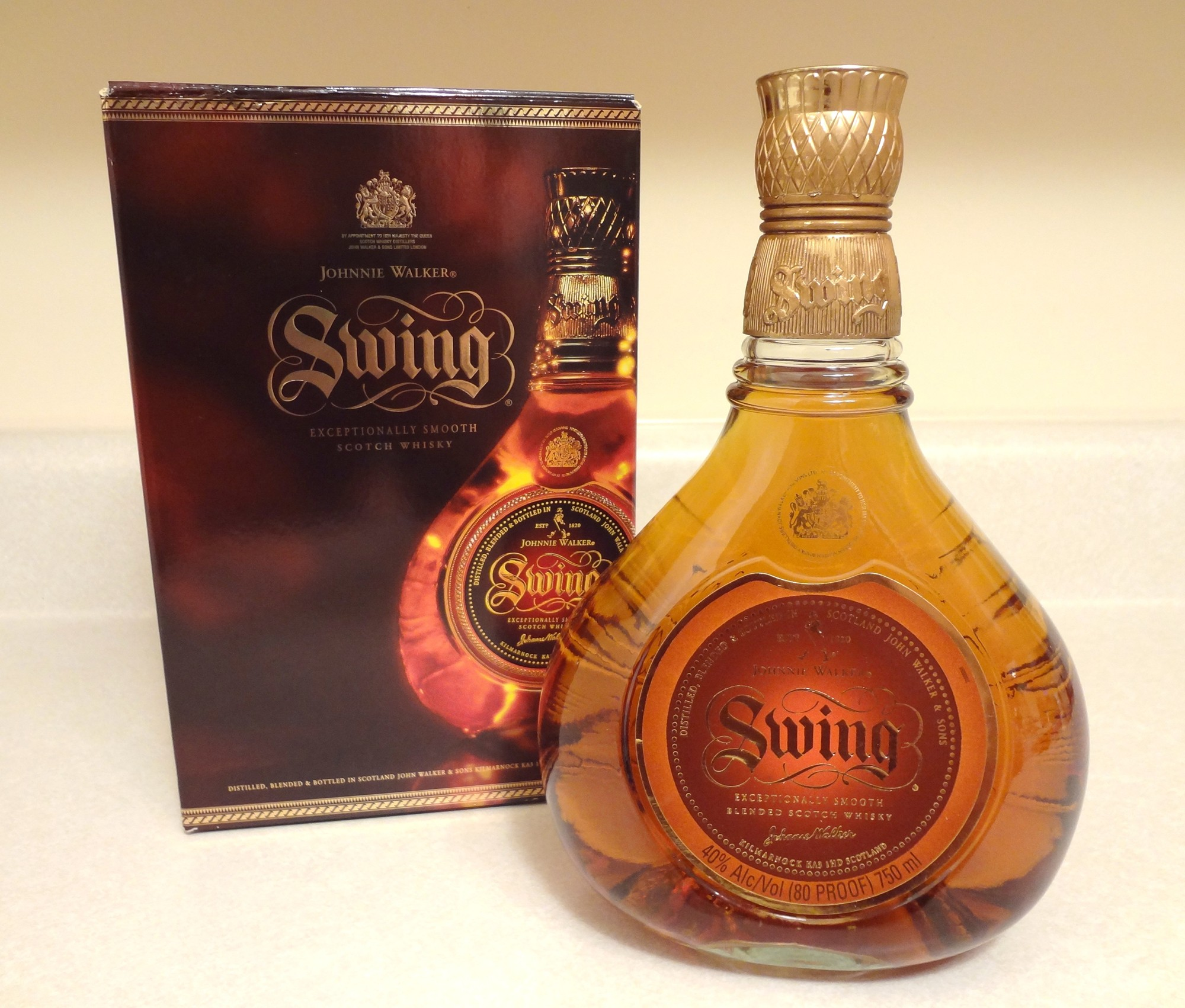
Johnnie Walker Swing

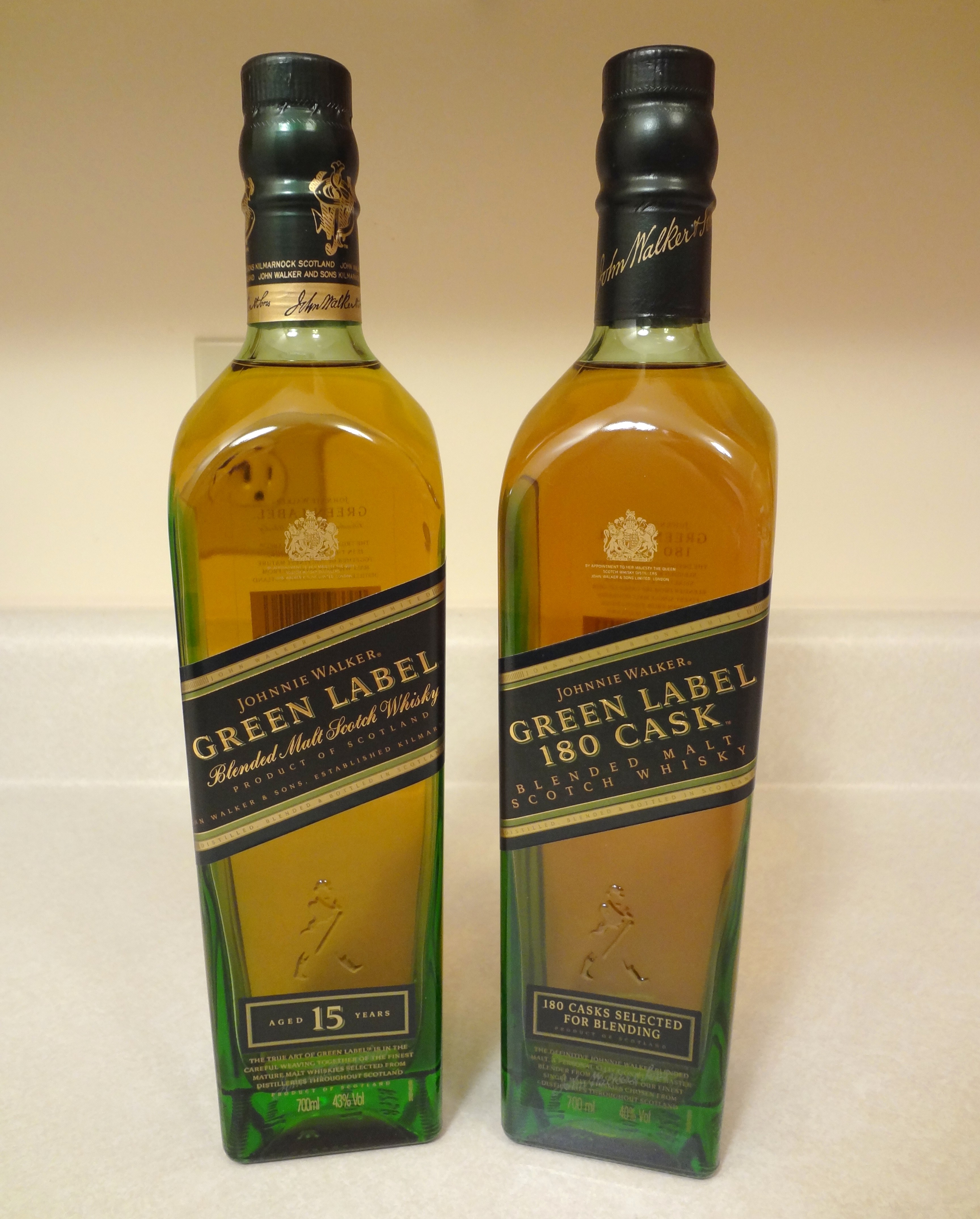
Johnnie Walker Green Label & Green Label 180 Cask

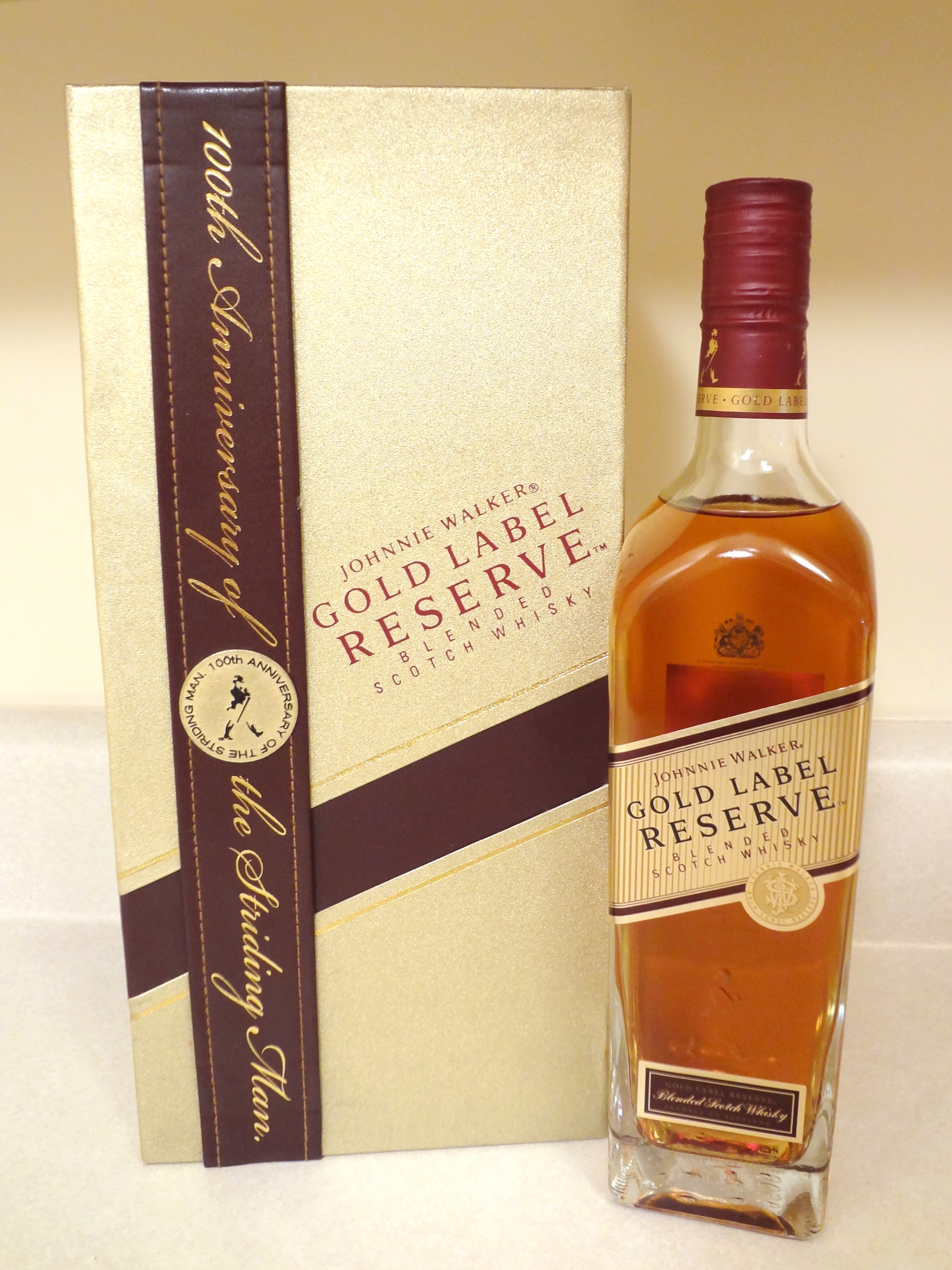
Johnnie Walker Gold Label Reserve

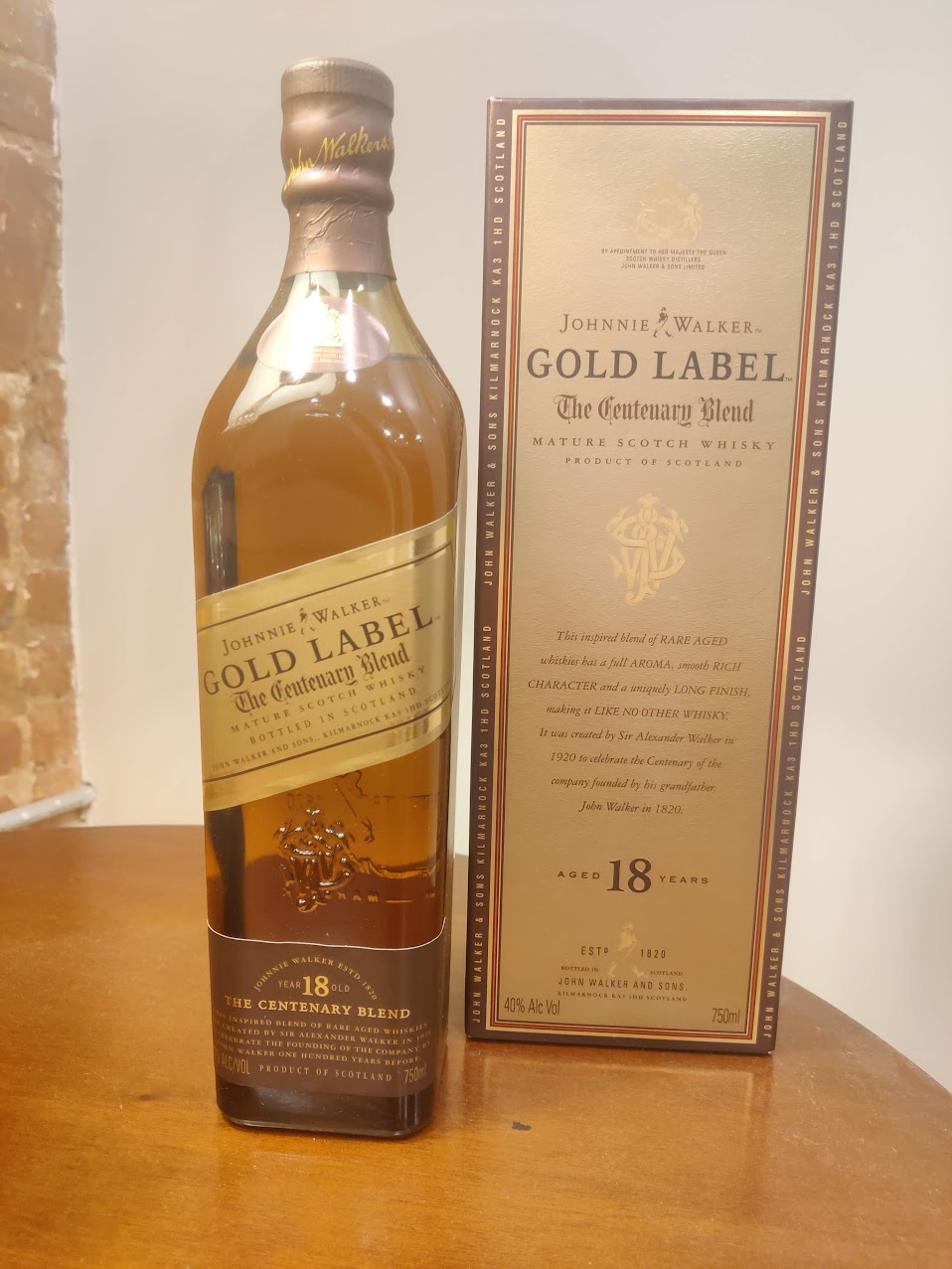
Johnnie Walker Gold Label "The Centenary Blend" 18-Year [Pre-2013]

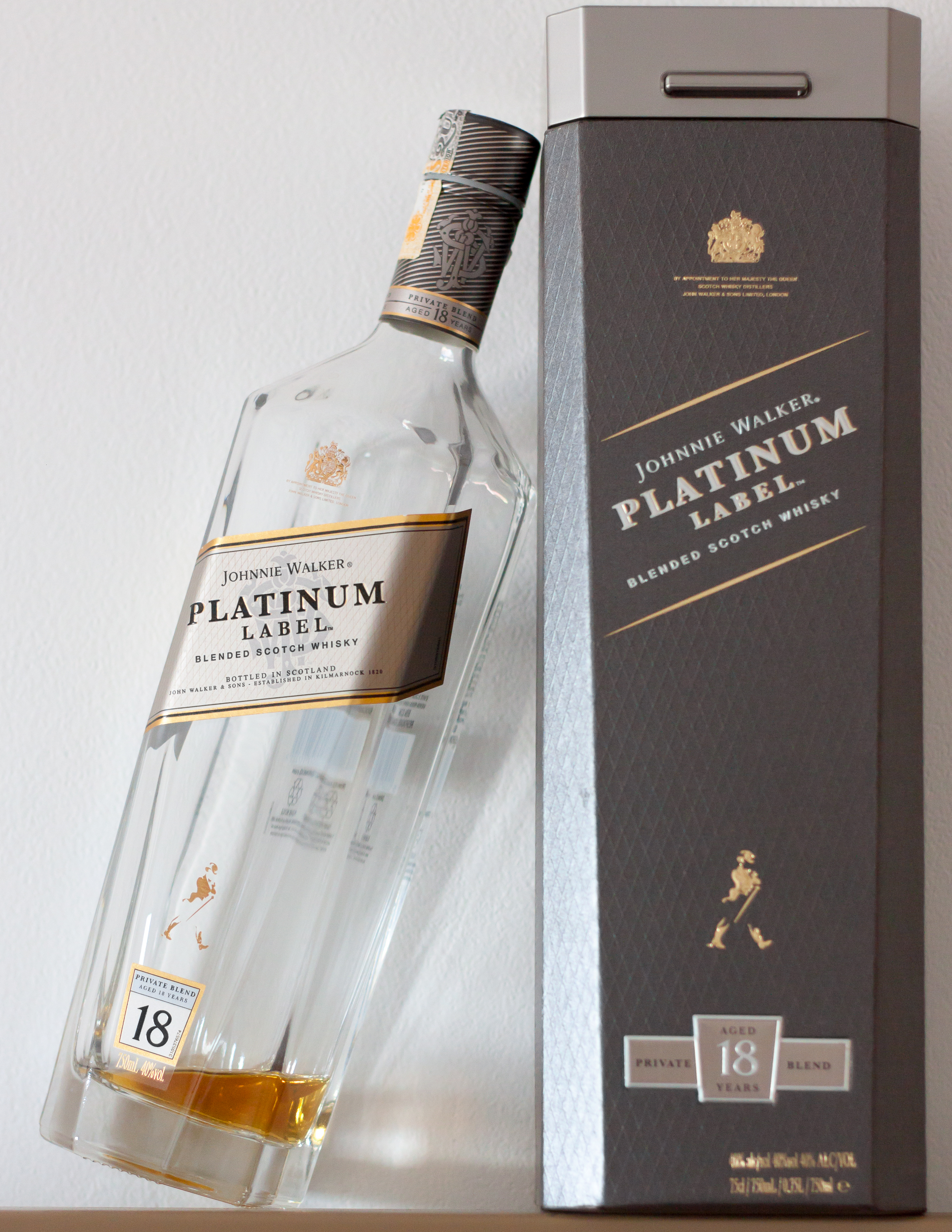
Johnnie Walker Platinum Label

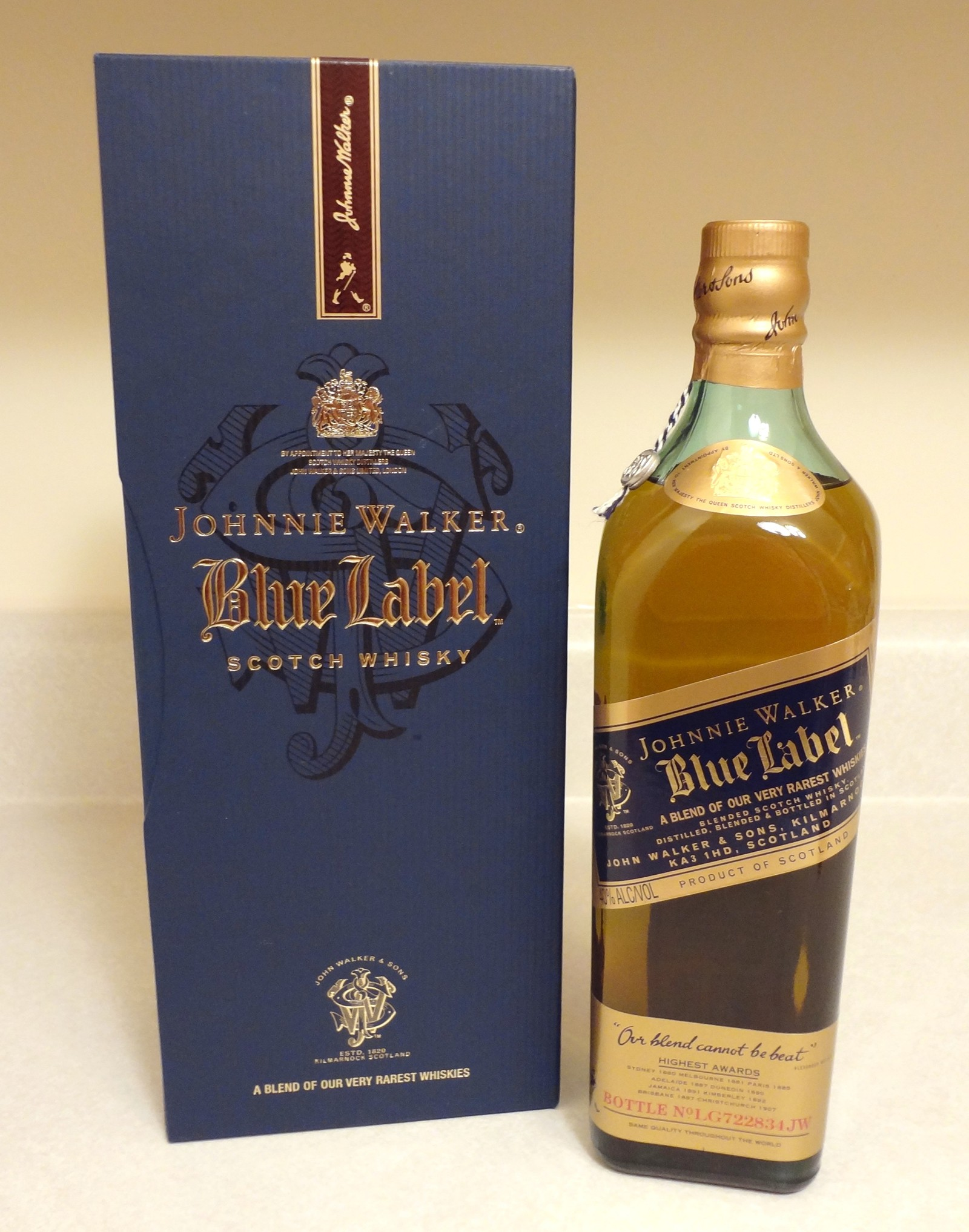
Johnnie Walker Blue Label

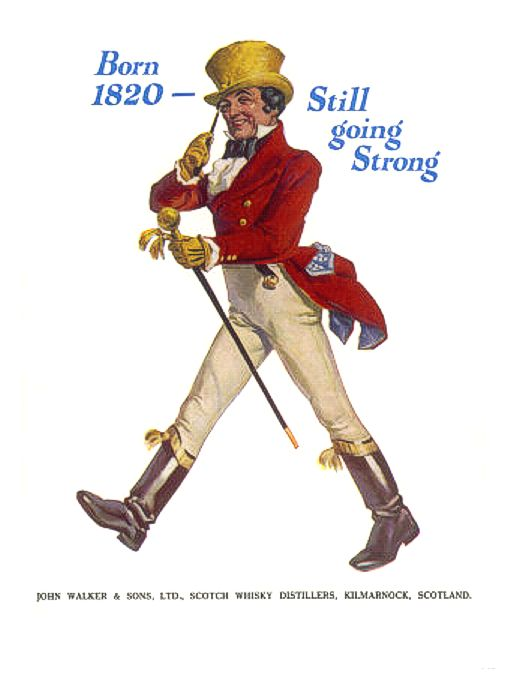
The Striding Man advertising image
