= John Walker (grocer) =

Scottish grocer

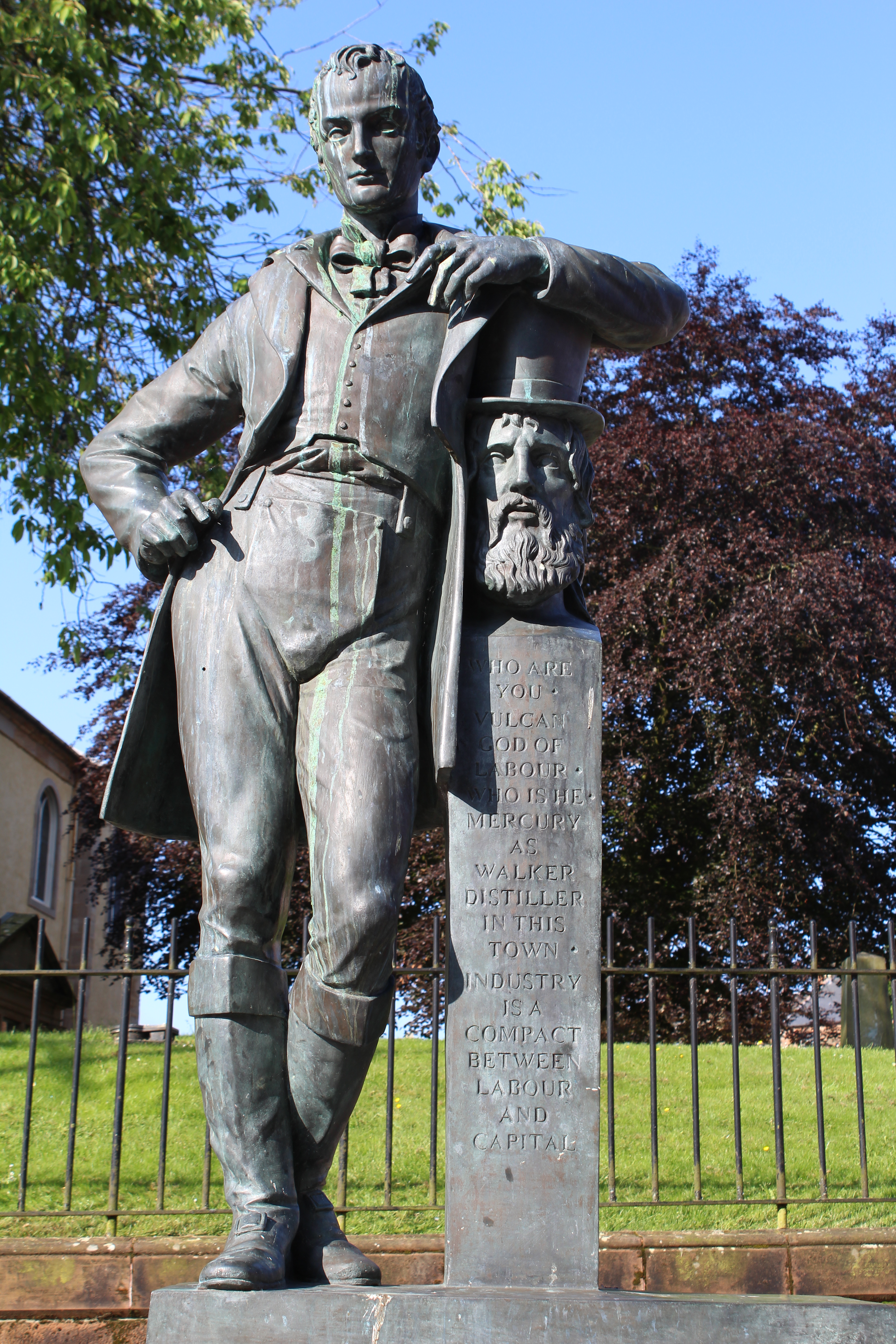
- Statue of Walker in Kilmarnock, Scotland
- Born: 1805; Kilmarnock, Scotland
- Died: 1857 (aged 51–52)
- Occupation: Grocer

John Walker (1805–1857) was a Scottish grocer, who originated what would become one of the world's most famous whisky brand names, Johnnie Walker, despite the fact he was himself a teetotaler.

== Biography ==
John Walker was born in 1805 near Kilmarnock in East Ayrshire. When his father Alexander died in 1820, he was left £417 in trust. In 1820, the trustees invested in an Italian warehouse, grocery, and wine and spirits shop on the High Street in Kilmarnock.

In 1833, John married Elizabeth Purves. He was a respected businessman, leader of the local trade association, and a Freemason. His store's stock was almost entirely destroyed in an 1852 flood, but the business recovered within a couple of years. His own whisky brand, then known as "Walker's Kilmarnock Whisky" was popular locally, although John Walker himself was a teetotaler.

John's son Alexander Walker (named after John's father) had apprenticed with a tea merchant in Glasgow, and there learned the art of blending tea. When he returned to take over the business from his ailing father, he used those skills to create Old Highland Whisky (eventually renamed Johnnie Walker Black Label), the blend that made Johnnie Walker whisky famous.

As one writer put it:

Although he gave his name to the whisky, John Walker was a far less important figure to the brand than his son, Alexander. A disastrous flood in Kilmarnock in 1852 had destroyed all of Walker's stock, and when Alexander joined the business in 1856, he persuaded his father to abandon the narrow realm of the grocery trade and to go into wholesale trading.

At the beginning, the firm offered a range of spirits: Campbeltown whisky from the Kintyre Peninsula; whisky from the Inner Hebridean Island of Islay, with its pungent smoky flavor; patent still, or grain, whisky; and "Glenlivat" [sic], Speyside whisky. Even so, whisky sales under John Walker represented just 8 percent of the firm's income; by the time Alexander was ready to pass on the company to his own sons, that figure had increased to between 90 and 95 percent.

— Giles MacDonogh

The Scottish cricketer John Walker, who was later a senior director at John Walker and Co. was a direct descendant of Walker.

== Additional sources ==
- Scotch Whisky: A Liquid History by Charles MacLean. 2003 Charles MacLean & Cassell Illustrated. ISBN 1-84403-078-4
